= Nieuwesteeg Heritage Rose Garden =

Rose garden in Australia

Coordinates: 37.6862°S 144.4366°E

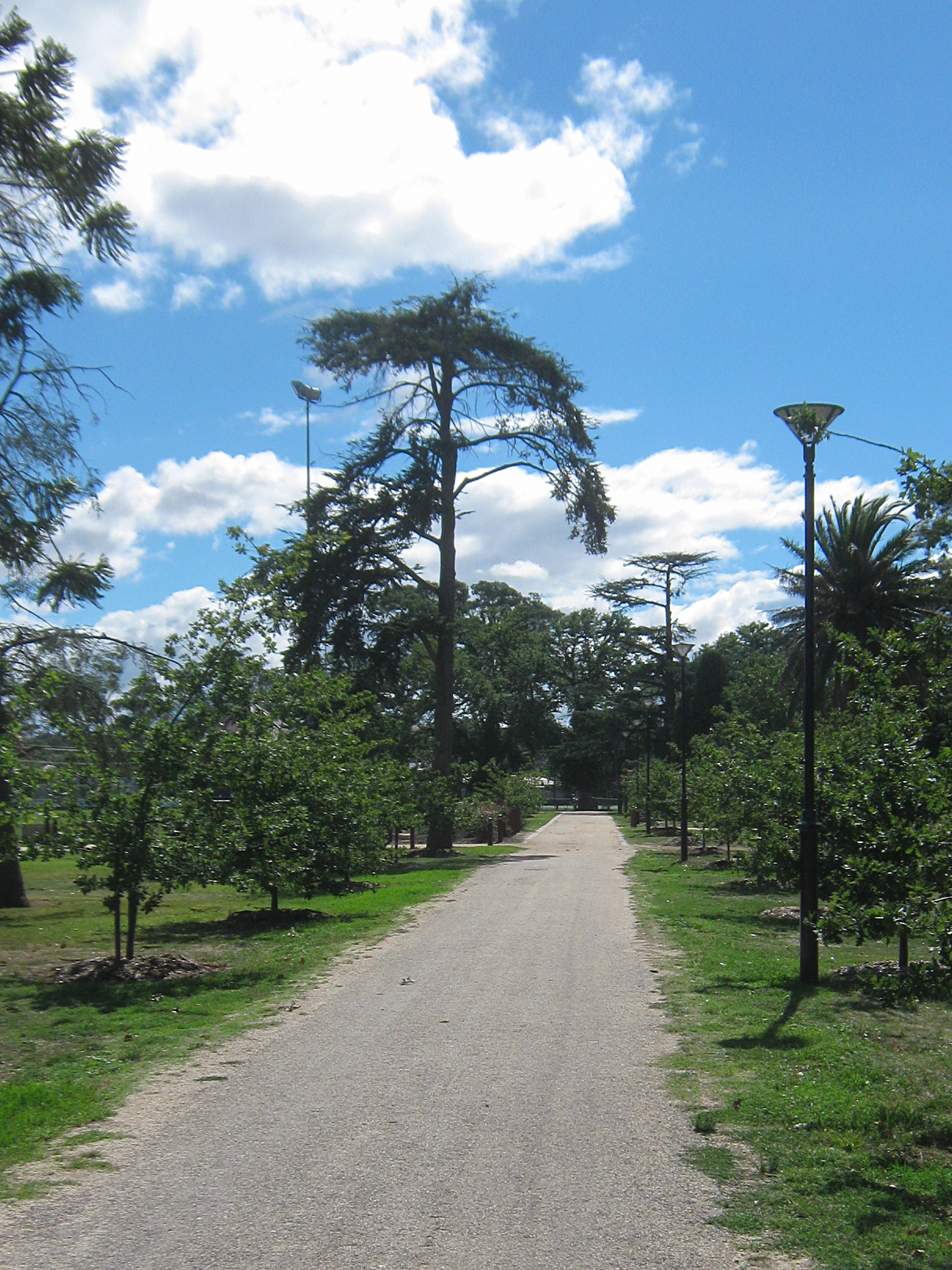
Maddingley Park path running north-west from the south gate. The Nieuwesteeg Heritage Rose Garden is behind the central cedar.

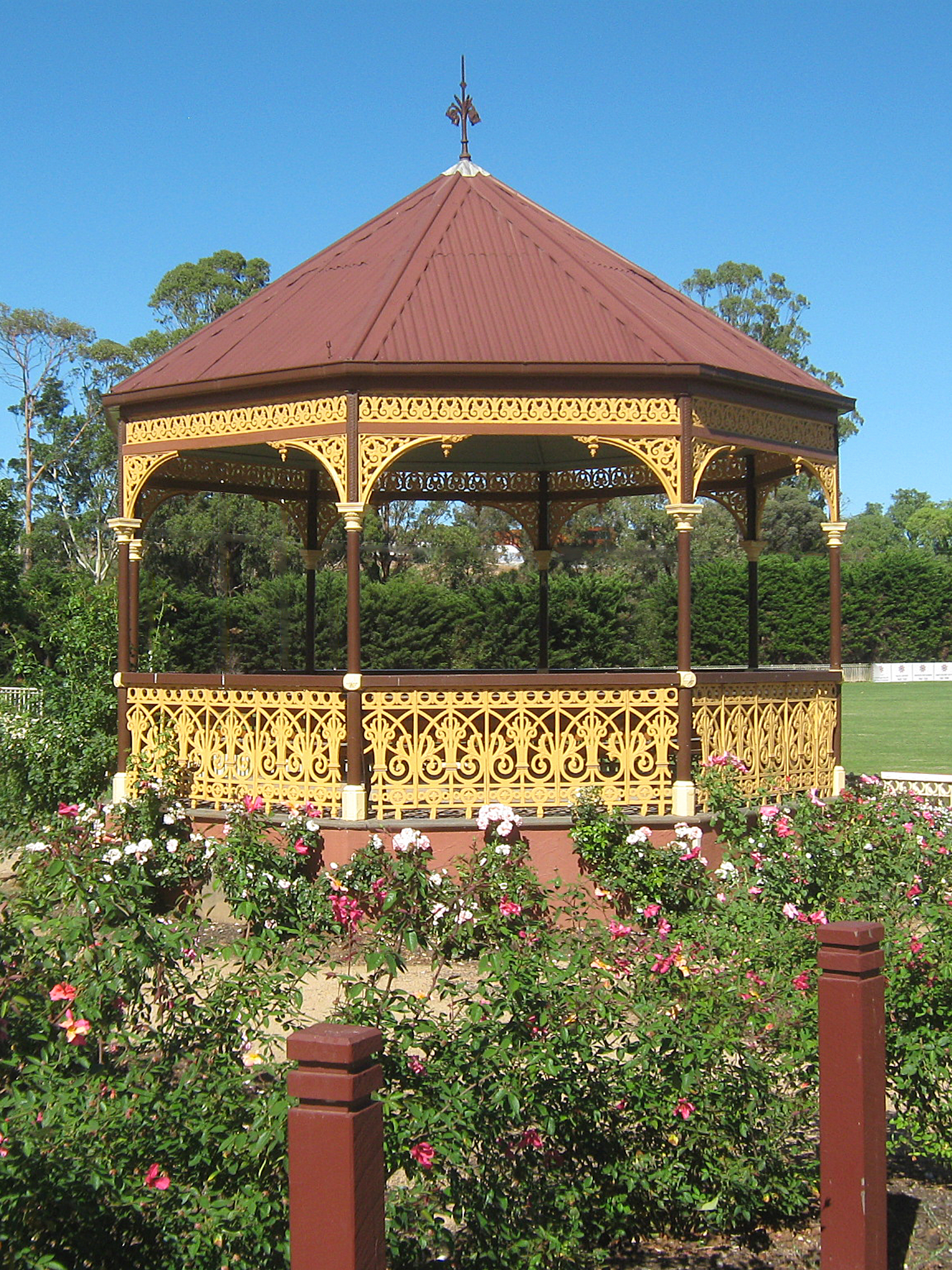
North view of the 1905 Dickie bandstand surrounded by the heritage rose collection. The six beds are numbered from the right.

Nieuwesteeg Heritage Rose Garden is a collection of rare and unusual roses, mostly hybrid teas, bred in the early 20th century. It is located in Maddingley Park, Bacchus Marsh, a town and suburb some 50 kilometres (30 mi) west of Melbourne and 14 kilometres (9 mi) west of Melton. The rose garden was established from 2009, with stock donated by rosarian John Nieuwesteeg.

== History of the park ==
Originally a police paddock, Maddingley Park was fitted out for picknickers and other day visitors from Melbourne when the railway station at Bacchus Marsh opened in 1887. The Dickie bandstand was built in 1905 and, by the Second World War, the park had developed gardens and landscaping features, many of which have since been lost. Today, the park contains a football and cricket oval, grass tennis courts and a netball court. There are many large 19th-century tree specimens and a second Memorial Rose Garden on the north side, near the park's north-west entrance on Bacchus Marsh–Geelong road.

== The Nieuwesteeg Heritage Rose Garden ==
The garden is located on the south side of the park, near the entrance from Bacchus Marsh railway station. It consists of 40 heritage roses. There is a substantial group bred or found in Australia, including rarities by Alister Clark, Olive Fitzhardinge, Frank Riethmuller and Patrick Grant. Others are unusual or unique in Australian public collections. The true 'Mlle de Sombreuil' is also found here. Some roses, such as Peter Lambert's 'Frau Karl Druschki', became the parents of hundreds of others.

Six beds of roses are arranged from north-west to south-east around the bandstand. More roses climb up the base of the bandstand itself. Two hedges of the China rose 'Mutabilis' frame the collection to the west and east.

The garden was established with support from John Nieuwesteeg (pronounced New-Steeg), a Yellingbo rosarian who identified many of the lost roses of Alister Clark and holds a significant collection of Clark and other old roses for the Garden Plant Conservation Association of Australia.

The Maddingley Park roses are a selection from his personal holdings and he gave about 26 roses over four years. From 2009 they were planted there by the Friends of Maddingley Park to complement the bandstand. About a tenth of the roses have not survived. The garden was named after John Nieuwesteeg in 2011.

== Catalogue of the roses ==
This catalogue raisonné collates maps and lists supplied by Friends of Maddingley Park, the Peter Cox reference book Australian Roses and the website Help Me Find Roses. The Sydney-bred 'Midnight Sun' in Bed 5 appears to have died and not been replaced. Most of the photos were taken in the Nieuwesteeg Heritage Rose Garden itself.

=== Bed 1 ===
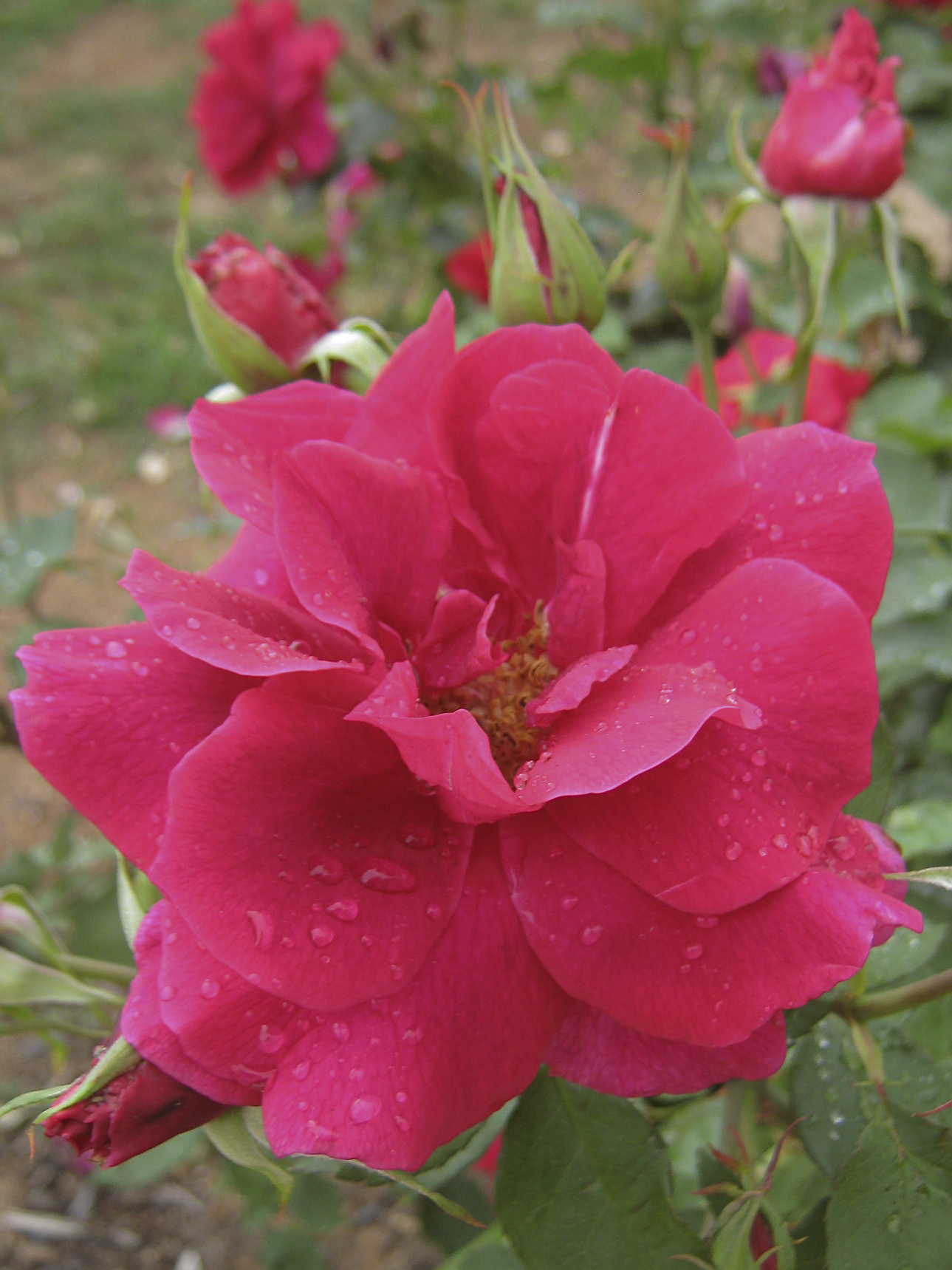
'Etoile de Hollande', Verschuren 1919. Hybrid Tea. Highly scented, rich velvety dark red blooms. Continuous flowering. The name, in French, means Star of Holland. Three bushes.

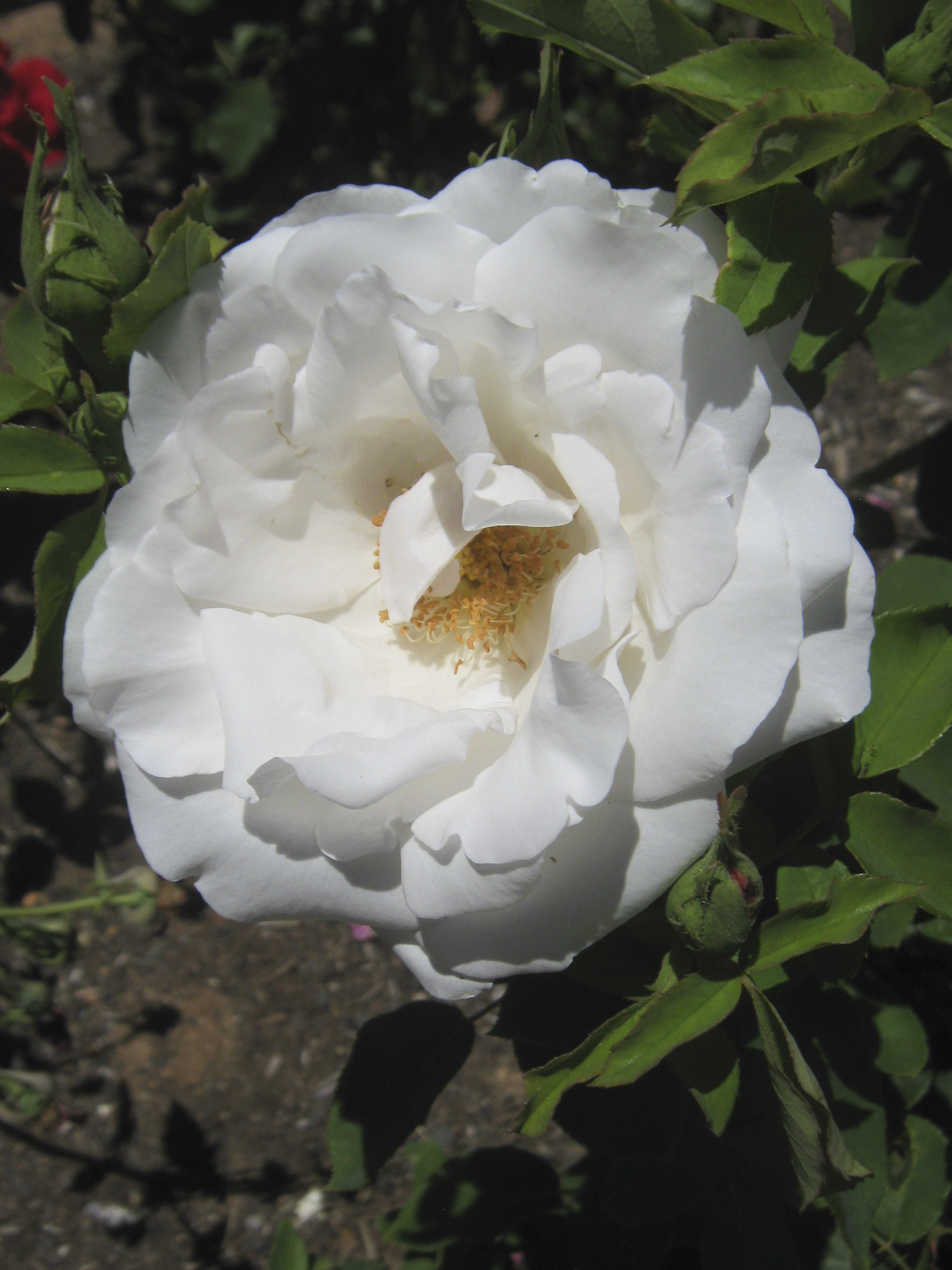
'Frau Karl Druschki' Peter Lambert 1901. Hybrid Tea. Scentless but an unusually pure white. This rose revolutionised white roses and has many descendants, at least one in the Nieuwesteeg garden.

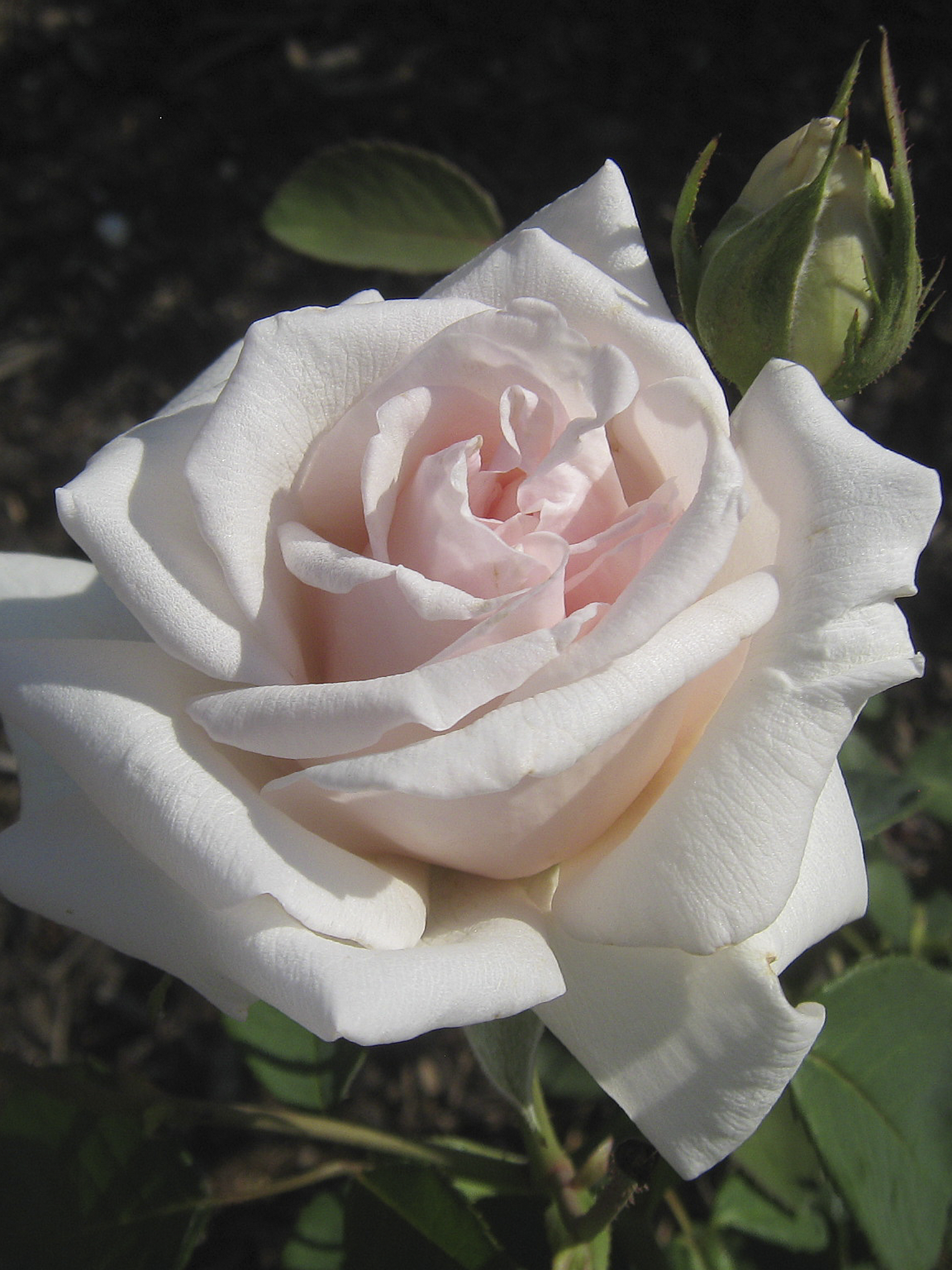
'Lady Edgeworth David' Olive Fitzhardinge, Sydney 1939. Hybrid Tea. Similar pink to 'Souvenir de la Malmaison', mild scent. Lady David was a Warrawee neighbour and friend of the breeder.

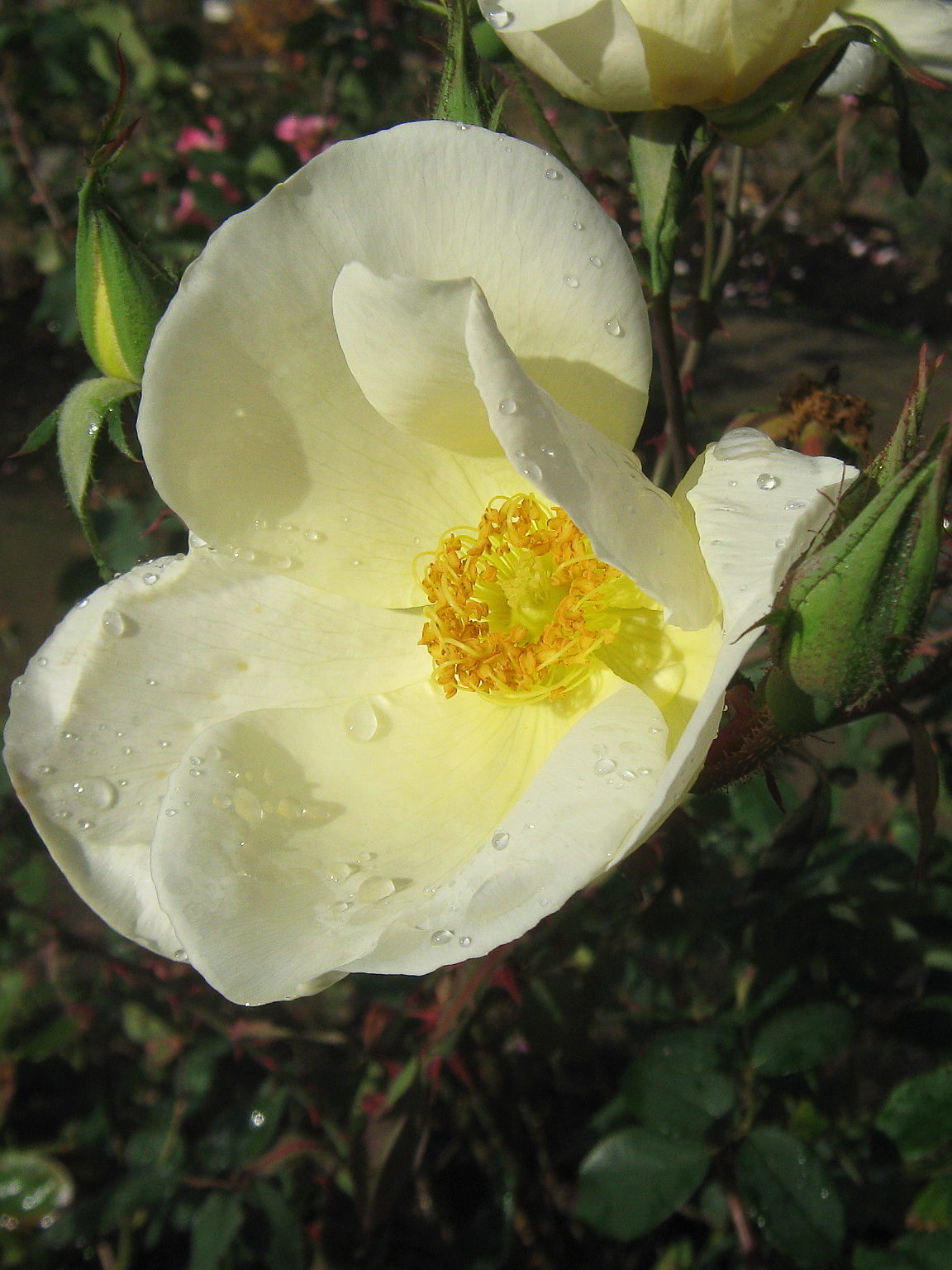
"Bishop's Lodge Precious Porcelain" Found at Bishop's Lodge, Hay NSW. Hybrid Tea. Big yellow singles fading to cream. Red smudges on the petal edges suggest this rose may be 'Irish Harmony', Dickson, Northern Ireland, 1904.

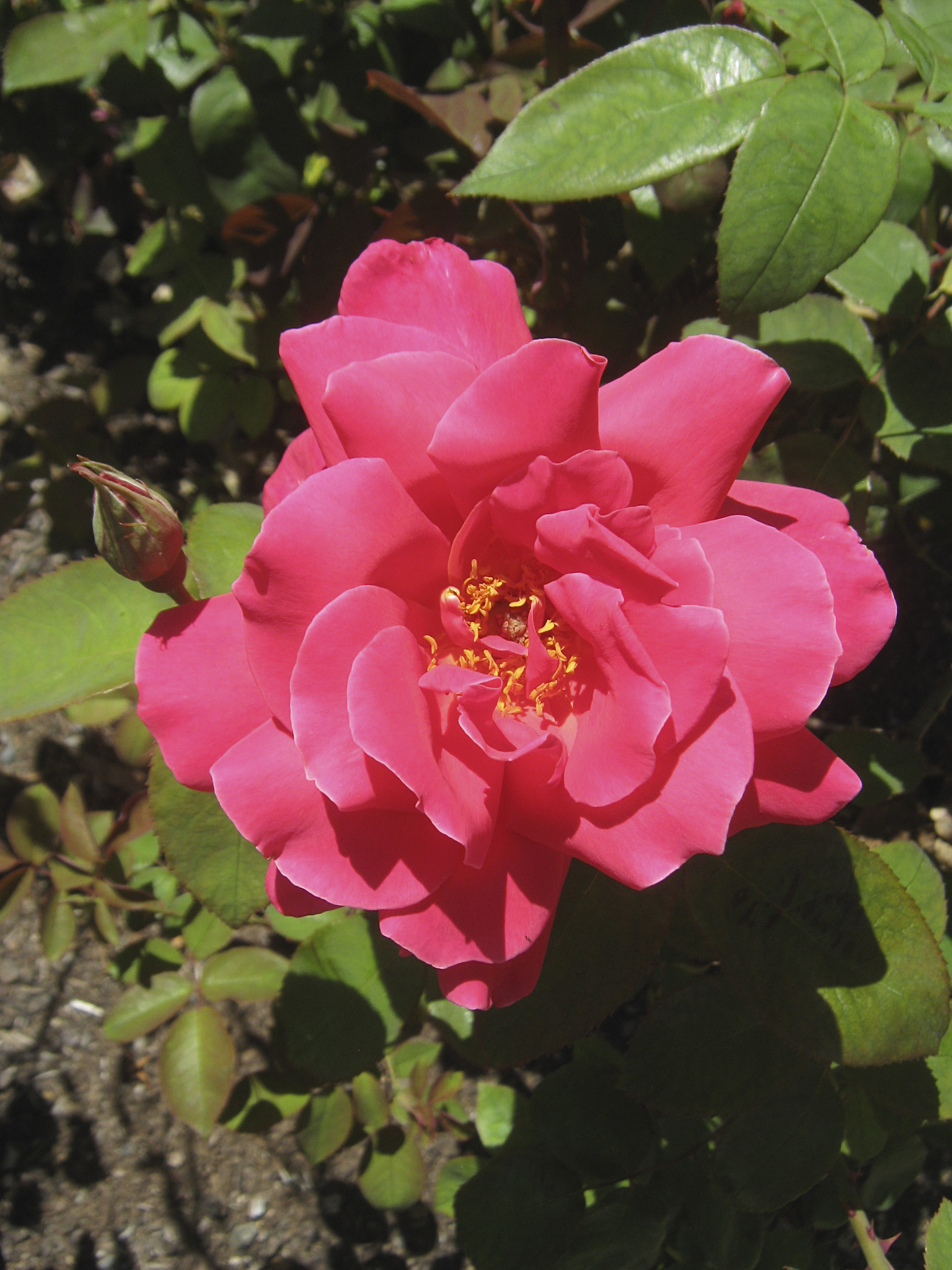
'Charlotte Armstrong' Lammerts 1940. Hybrid Tea. Very large, full. Strong fragrance. Very thorny, unlike 'Mission Bells' in Bed 6, which it otherwise resembles. Named after the wife of Dr Lammerts' rose-company employer.

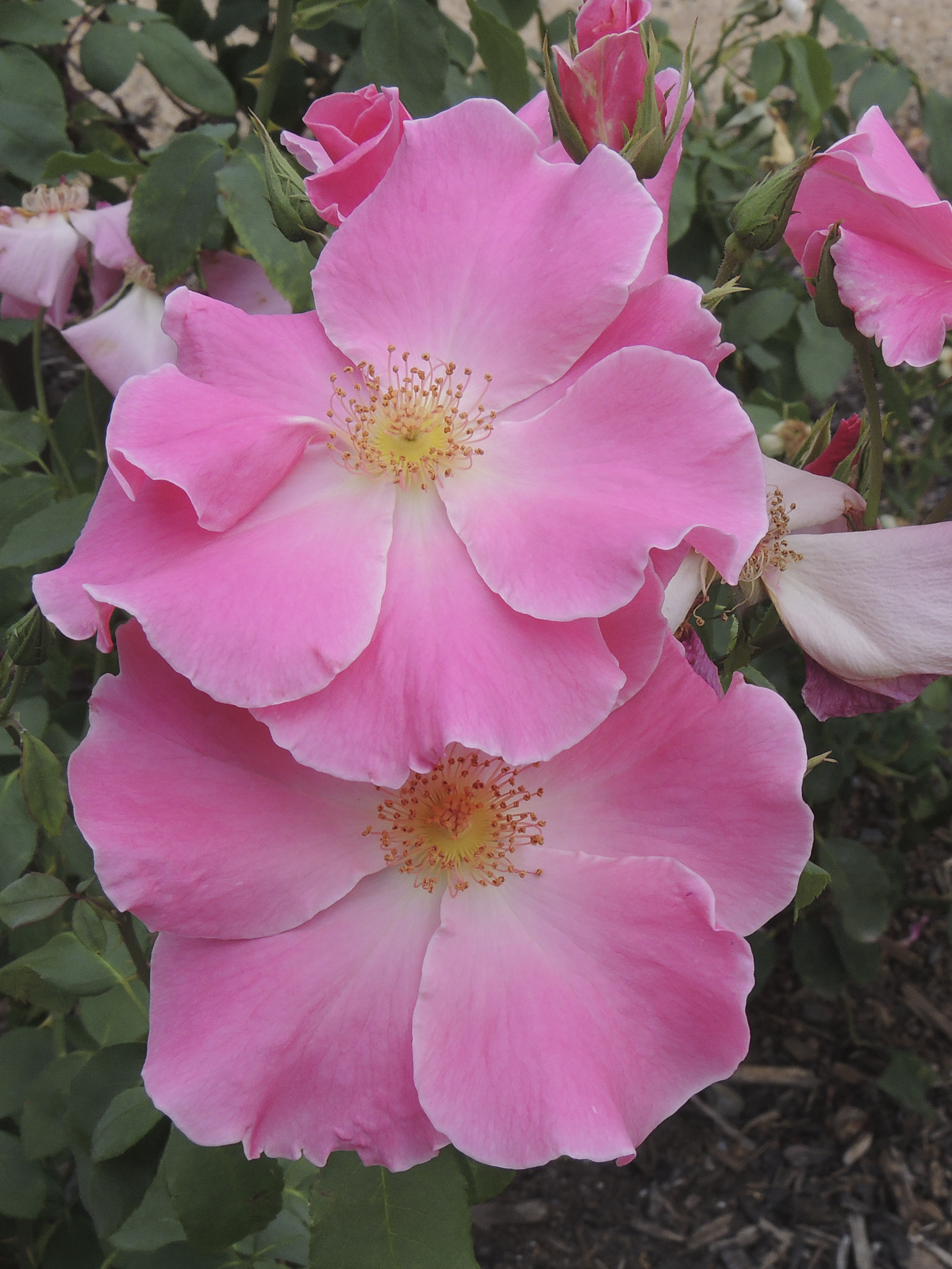
'Bonnie Jean' Archer 1933. HT. Tall, single pink. Collected from Alister Clark's garden. Archer specialised in single roses, though only three survive. His 'Ellen Willmott' is in Bed 5.

=== Bed 2 ===
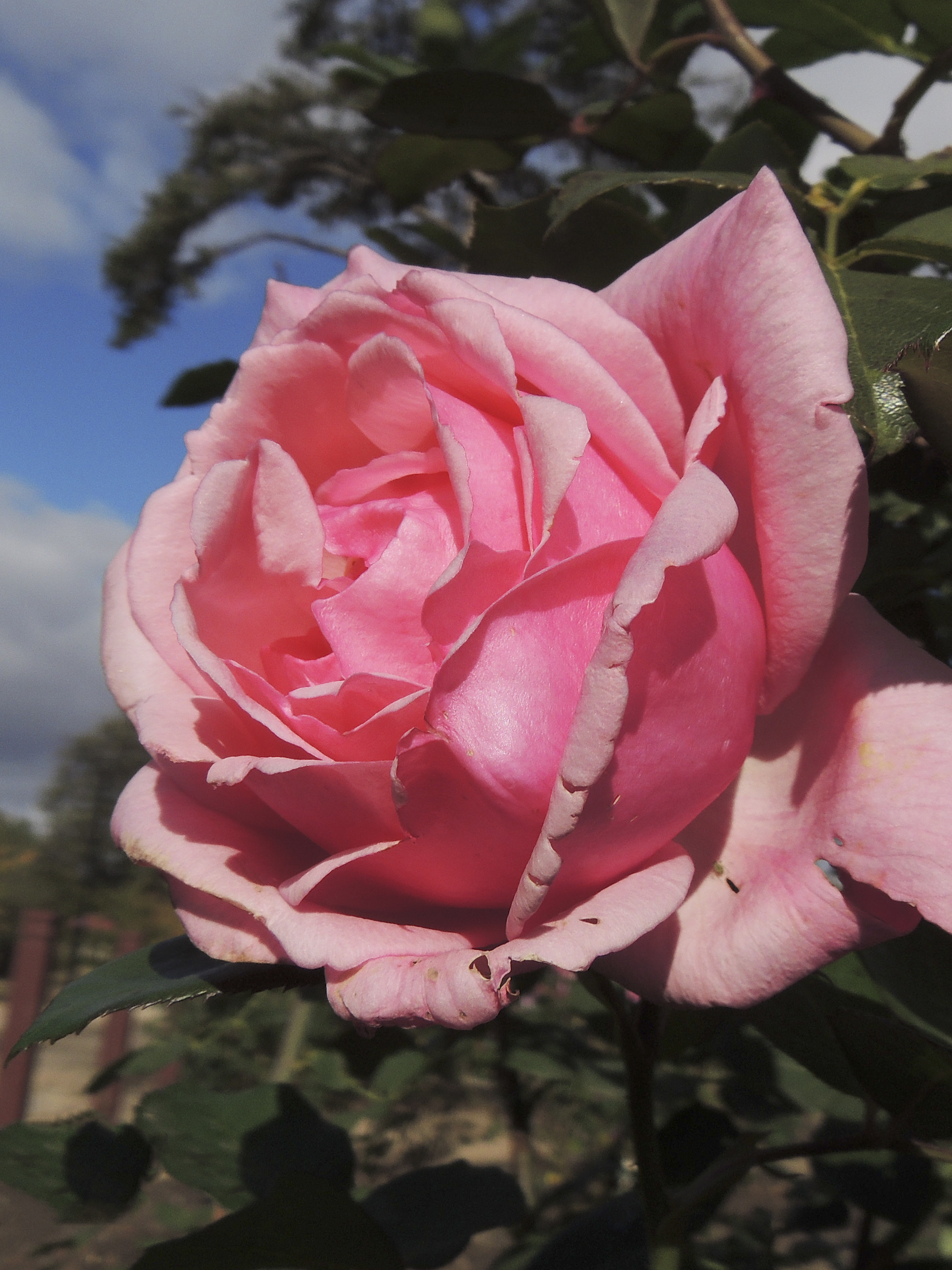
'Radiance' Cook and Son 1908. Hybrid Tea. Rosy pink globes, strongly scented. A deeper pink and more tightly globular than its grandparent, 'Mme Caroline Testout'.

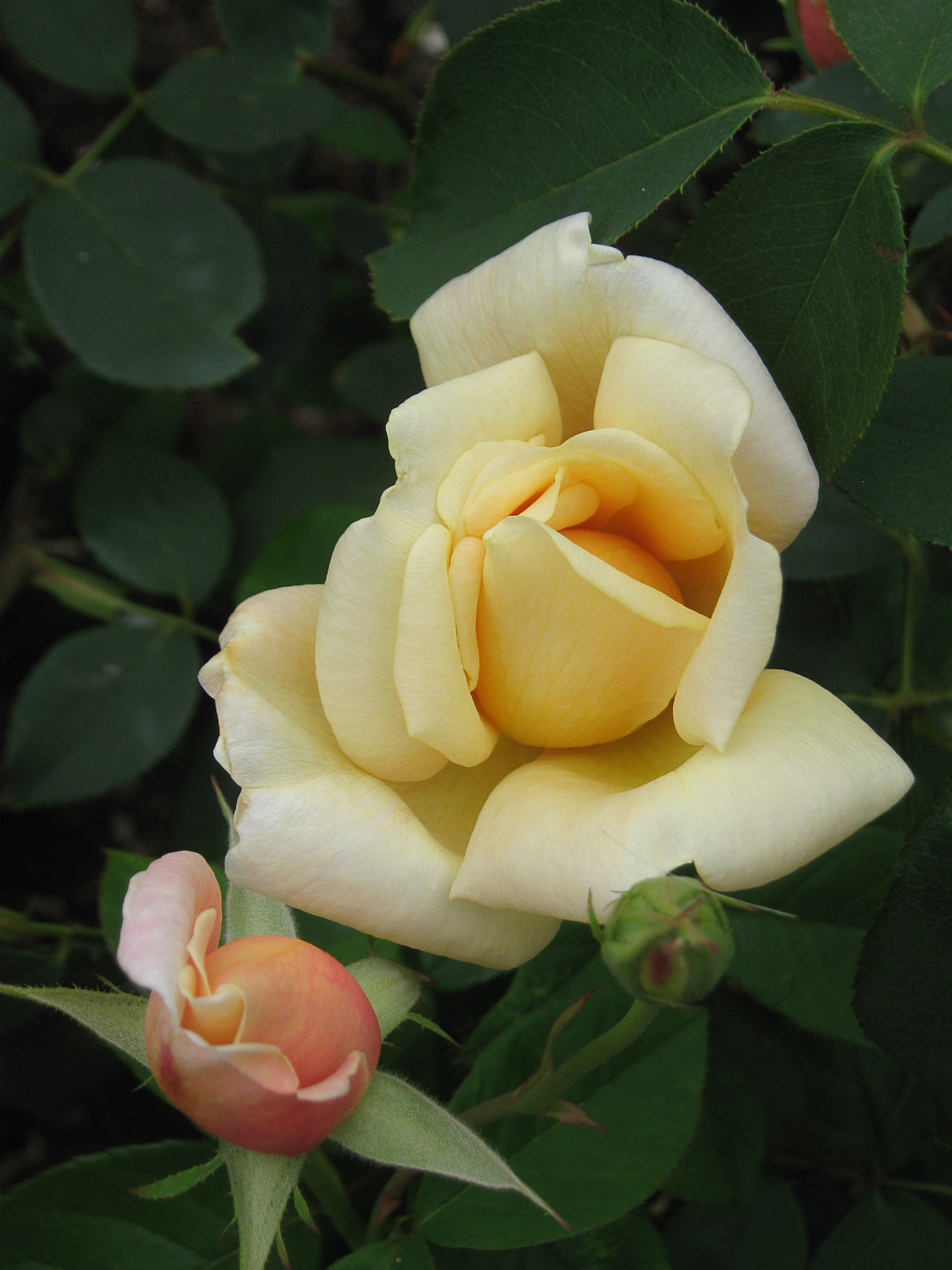
'Duchess of Wellington' Dickson 1909. Hybrid Tea. Apricot shades ageing saffron yellow. Gold stamens and strong scent. The Edwardian duchess was Kathleen Emily Bulkeley Williams, wife of the fourth duke, both from military families.

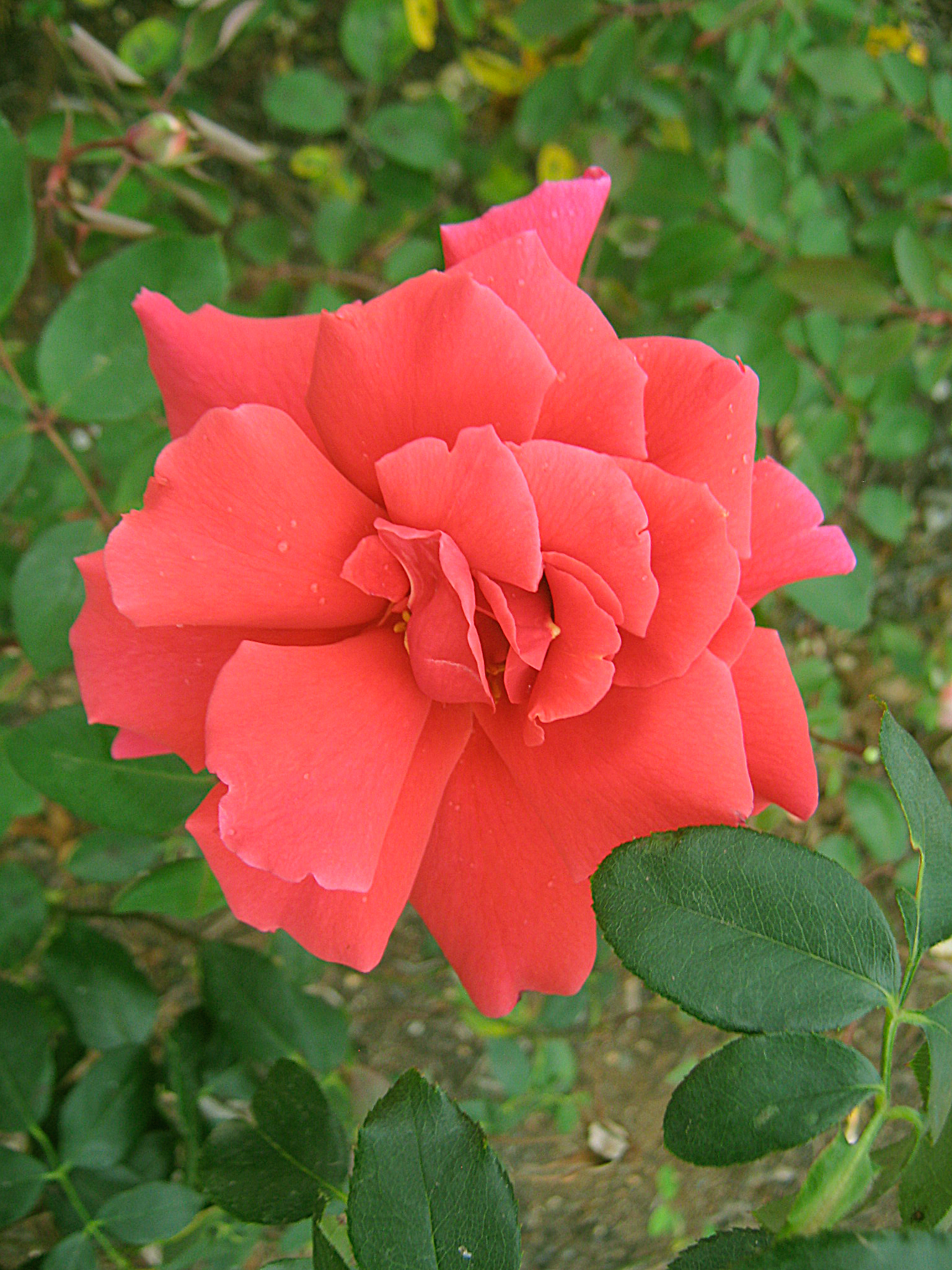
'Grande-Duchesse Charlotte' Ketten Frères, Luxemburg 1942. HT. Tomato red, with huge red and yellow thorns on the new growth. In 1942 Charlotte was monarch in her own right of Luxemburg but living in London in exile from German occupation.

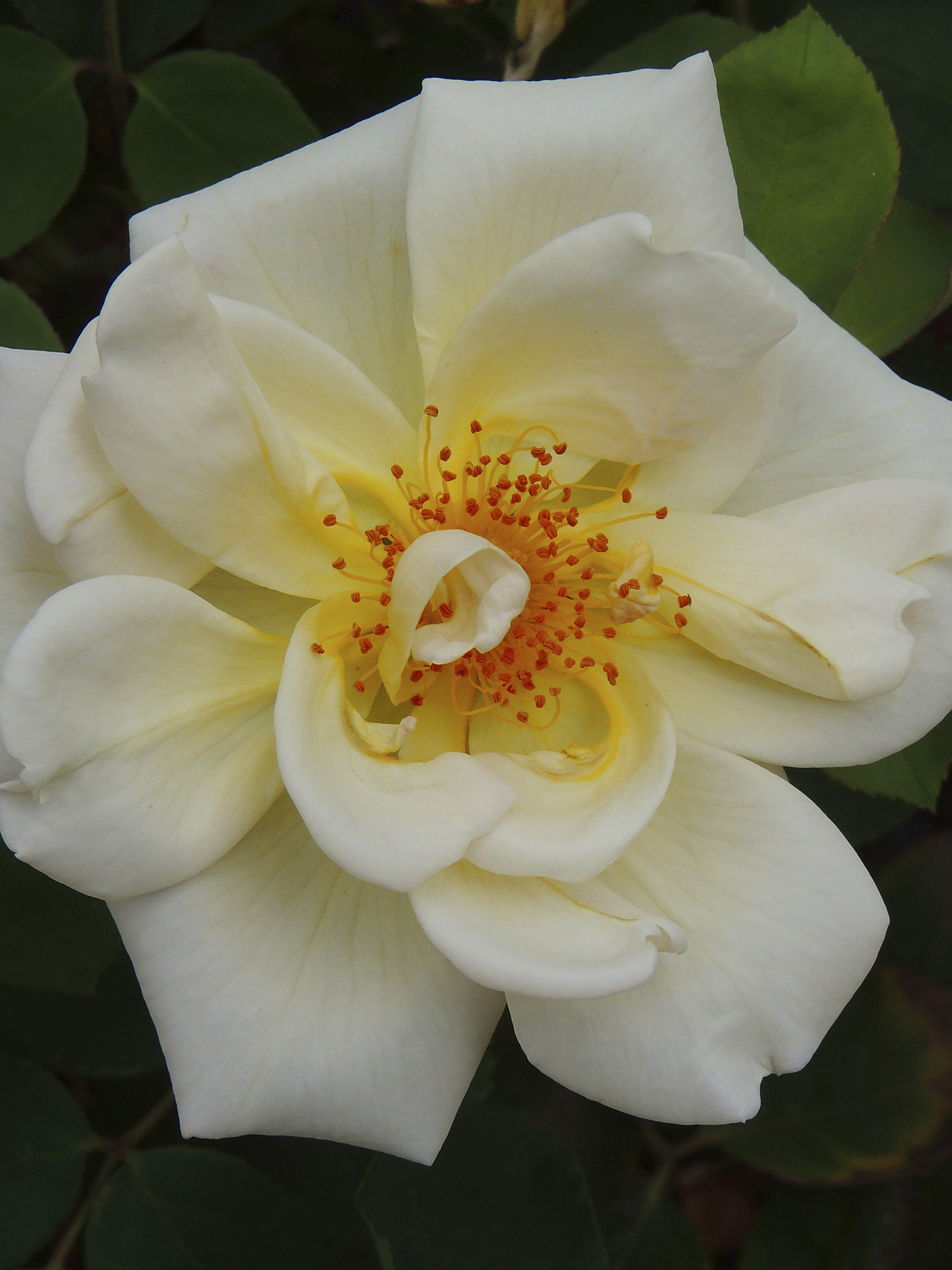
"Vestey's Yellow Tea" Found at Lady Vestey's Coombe Cottage, Coldstream. Tea. Creamy yellow.

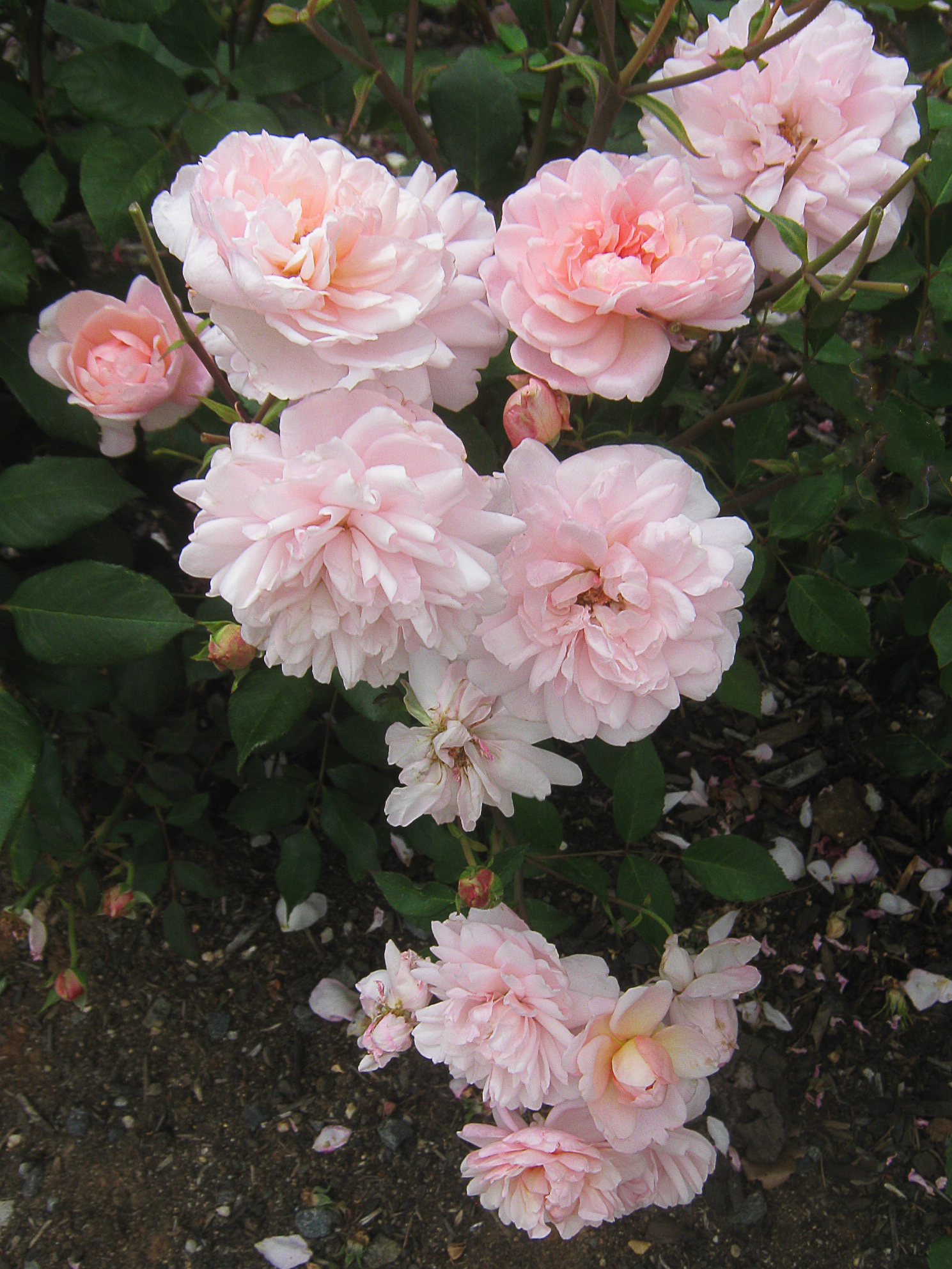
'Pink Gruss an Aachen' Kluis 1930. HT. Pink sport of ‘Gruss an Aachen’, Geduldig 1907. Gruss an Aachen is German for Greeting to Aachen.

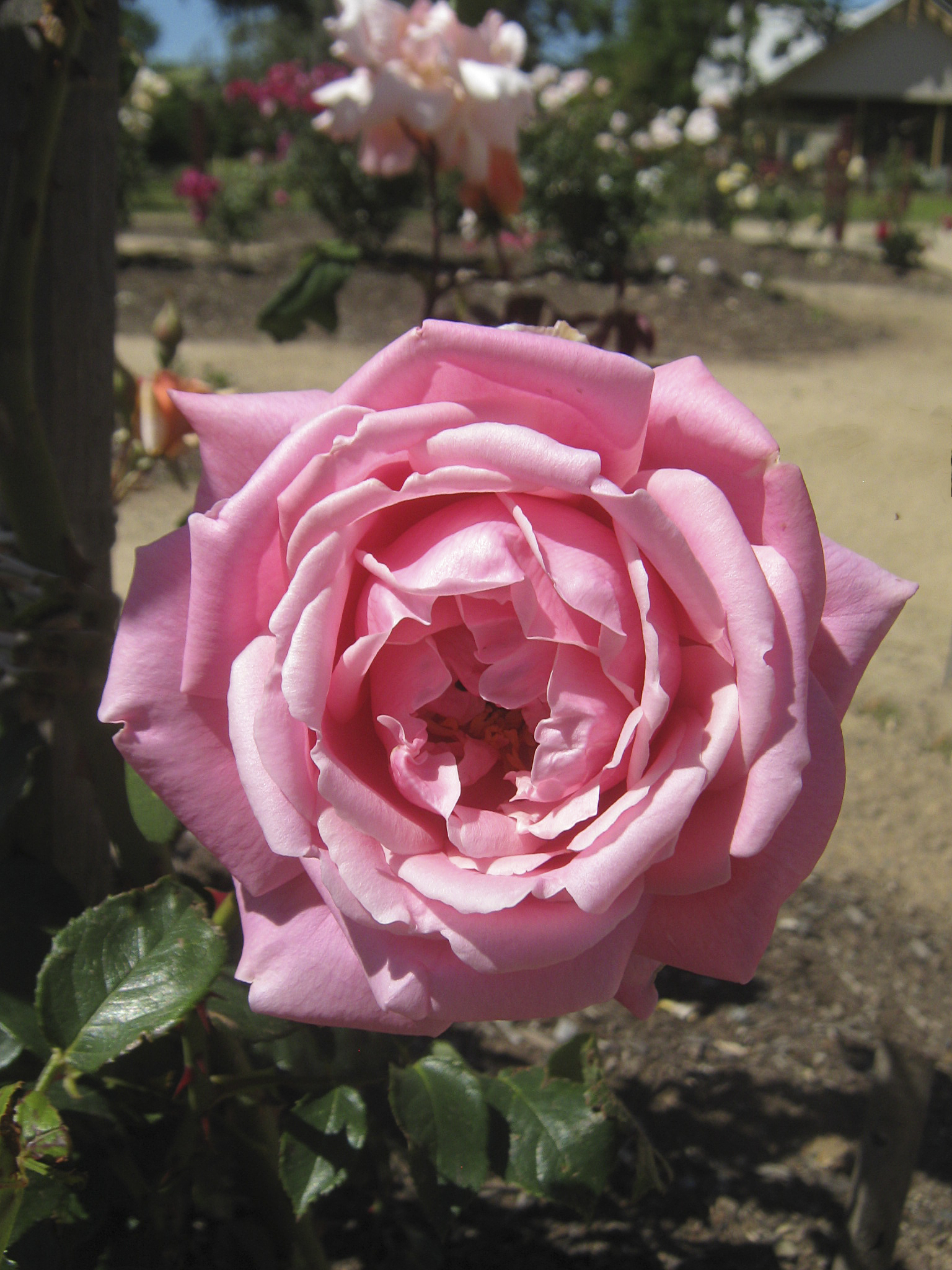
'Lady Woodward' Frank Riethmuller, Sydney 1959. HT. Strong tea rose scent. Blooms borne singly. Handsome thorns. Named after the NSW governor's wife, born Amy Weller in Ballarat.

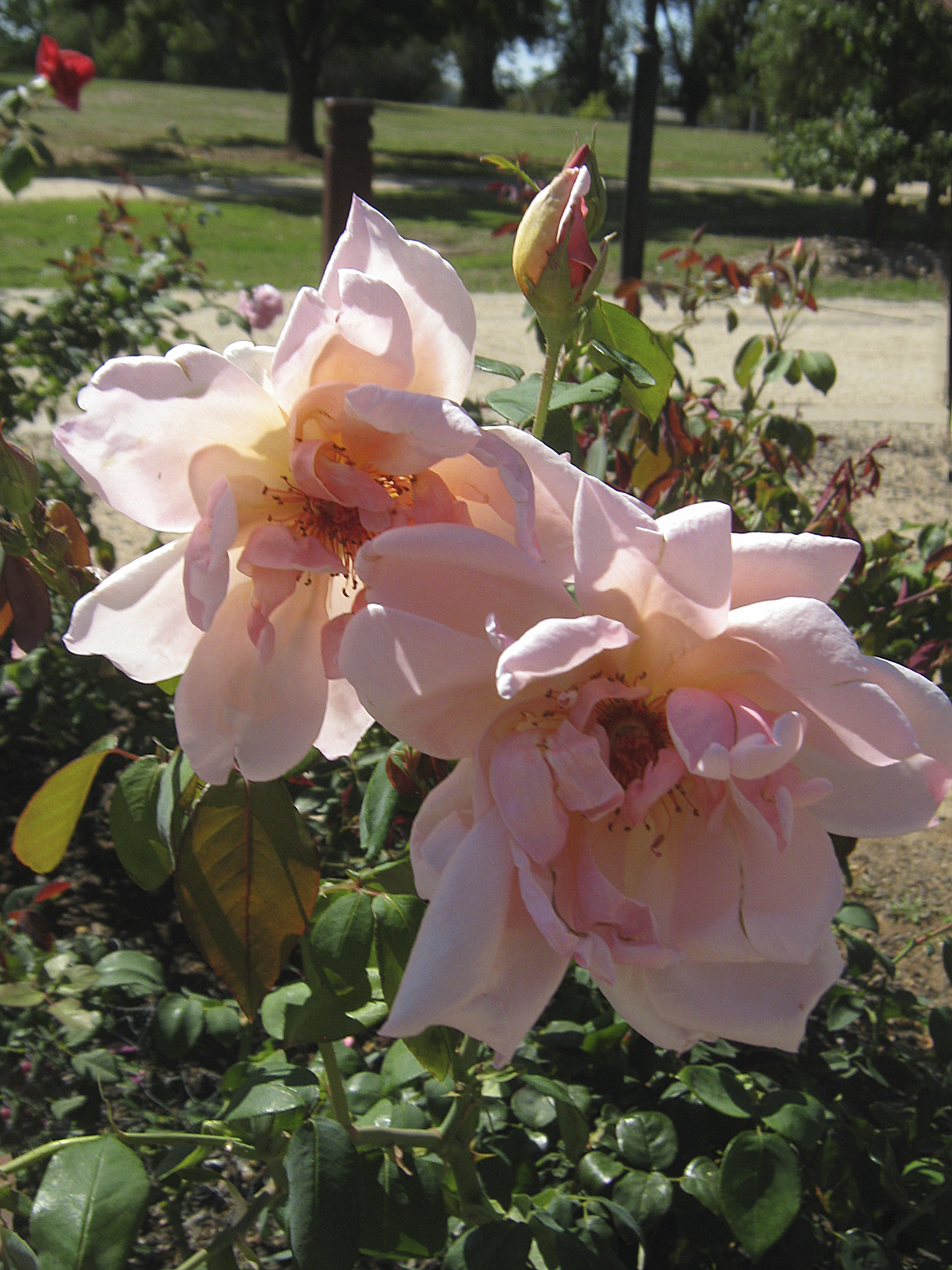
'Mrs A.R. Waddell' Pernet-Ducher 1909. HT. Salmon-pink with darker reverse. Apricot scent. A parent of ‘Albertine’. Arthur Robert Waddell was a Scottish doctor working in England who encouraged Pernet-Ducher's work on yellow roses.

=== Bed 3 ===
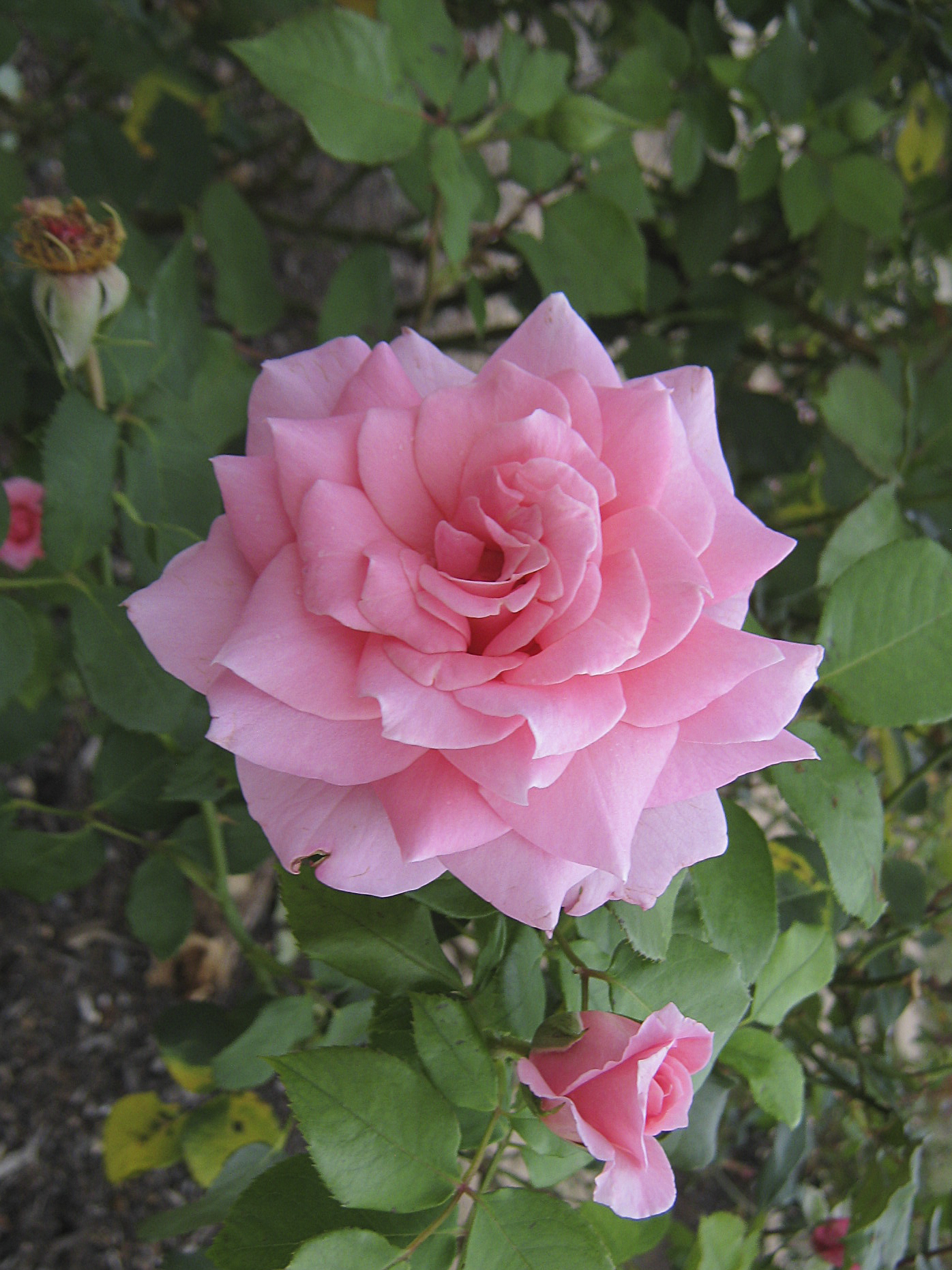
'Picture' McGredy 1932. Hybrid Tea. Clear rosy pink, imbricated and pointed in the classic hybrid tea way.

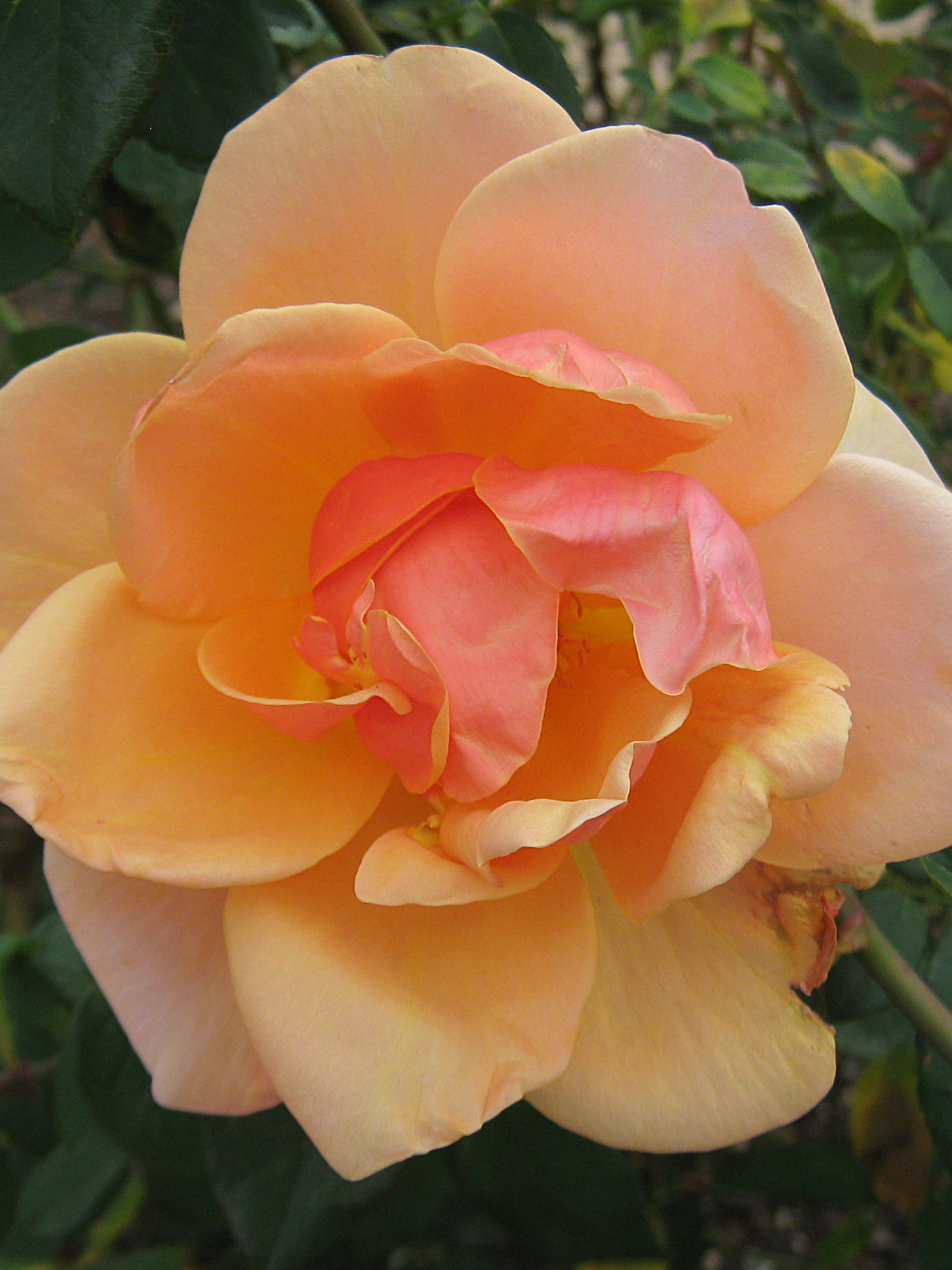
"Dettmann No.6" Found in the Kyneton VIC garden of Mr Hugh Dettmann. Pernetiana. Semi-double blooms with petals apricot-orange on the front, salmon-pink on the back. Good scent. In spring the orange can turn a brilliant sulphur yellow.

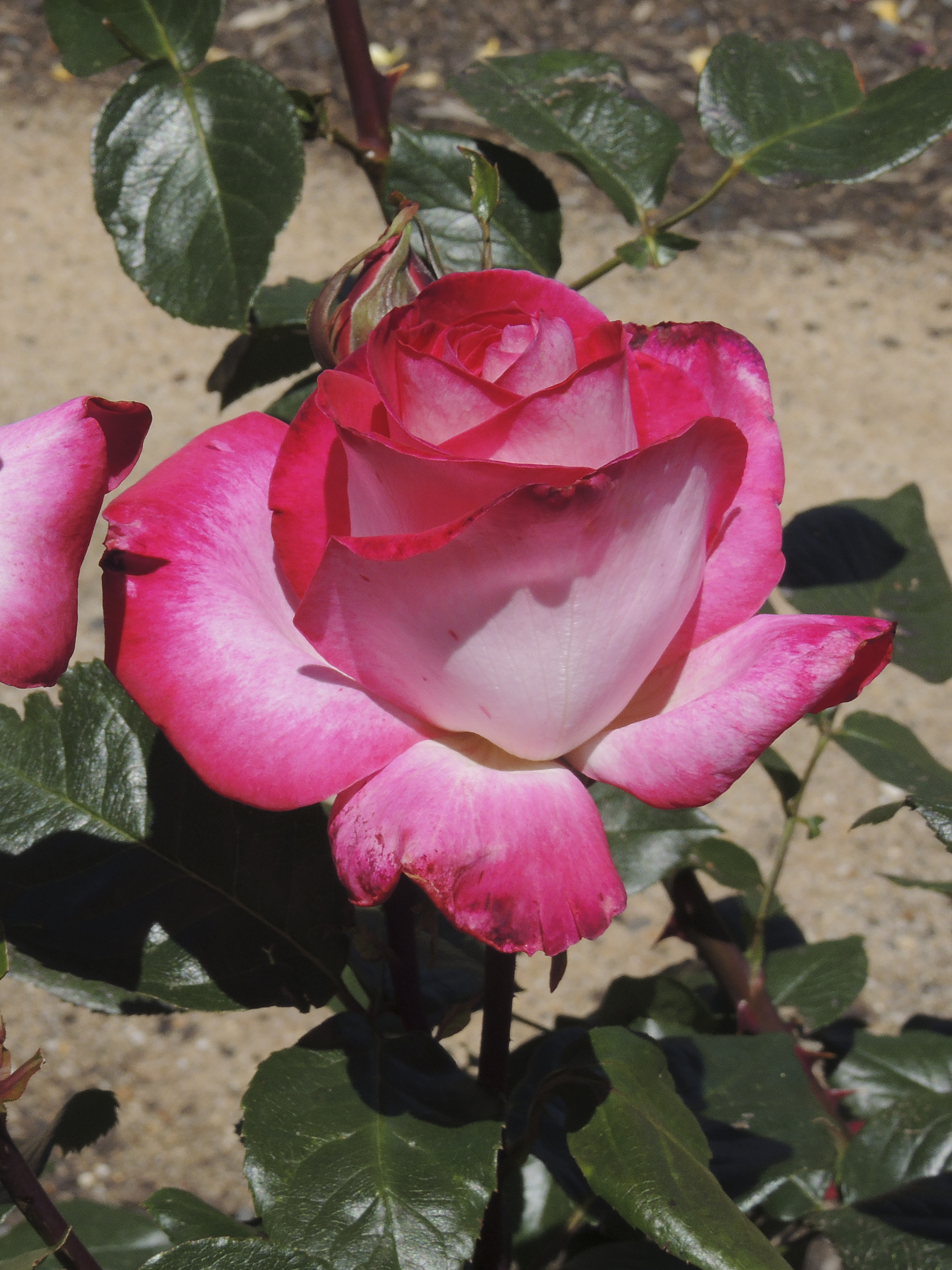
'Rose Gaujard' Gaujard 1958. Hybrid Tea. Cherry red, pale pink reverse. Named by Jean-Marie Gaujard, the breeder, after himself.

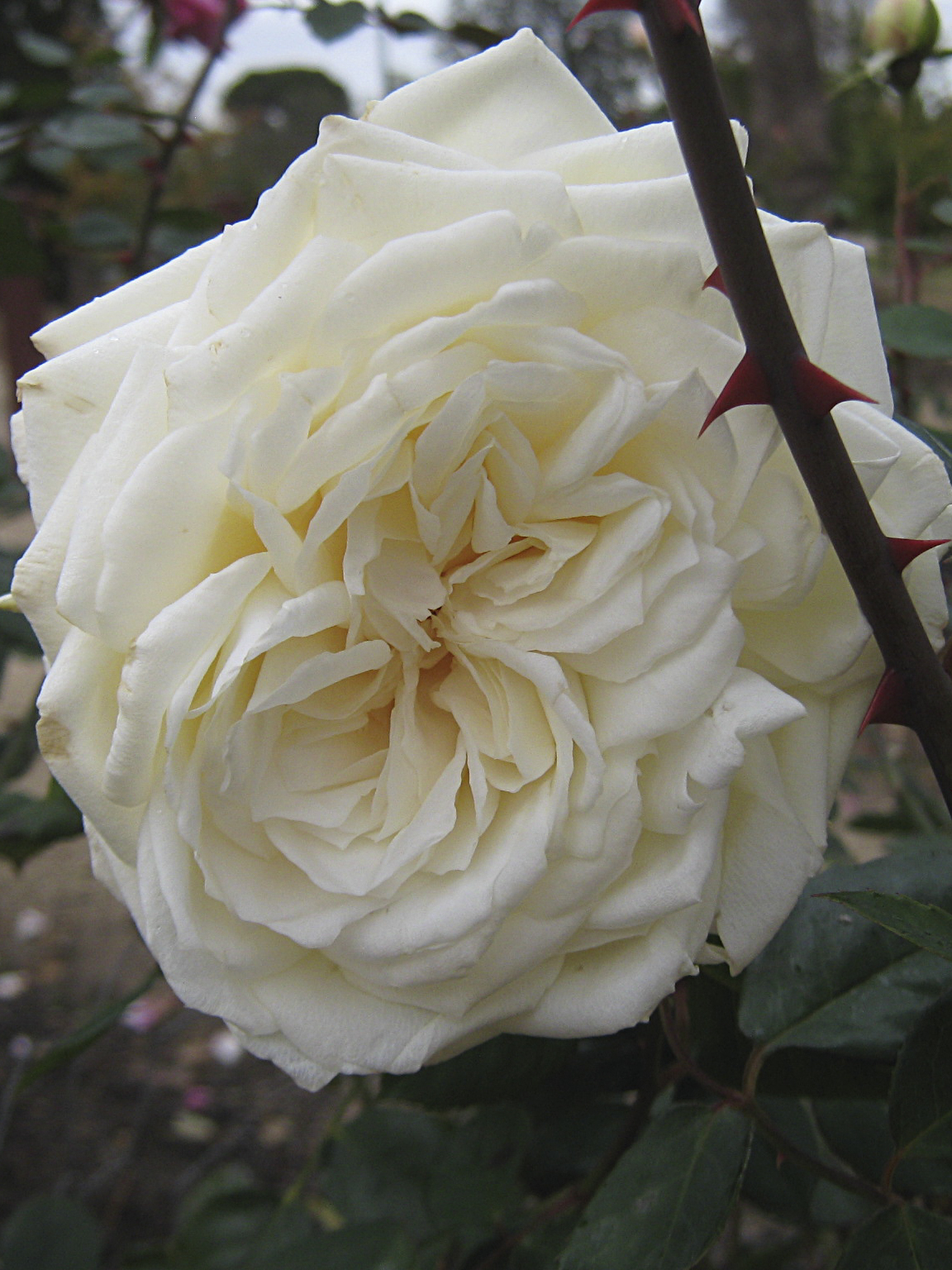
'Kaiserin Auguste Viktoria' Peter Lambert 1891. HT. White with yellow centres. Very double and fresh with outstanding scent. The name is German for Empress Augusta Victoria, first wife of the last Kaiser.

=== Bed 4 ===
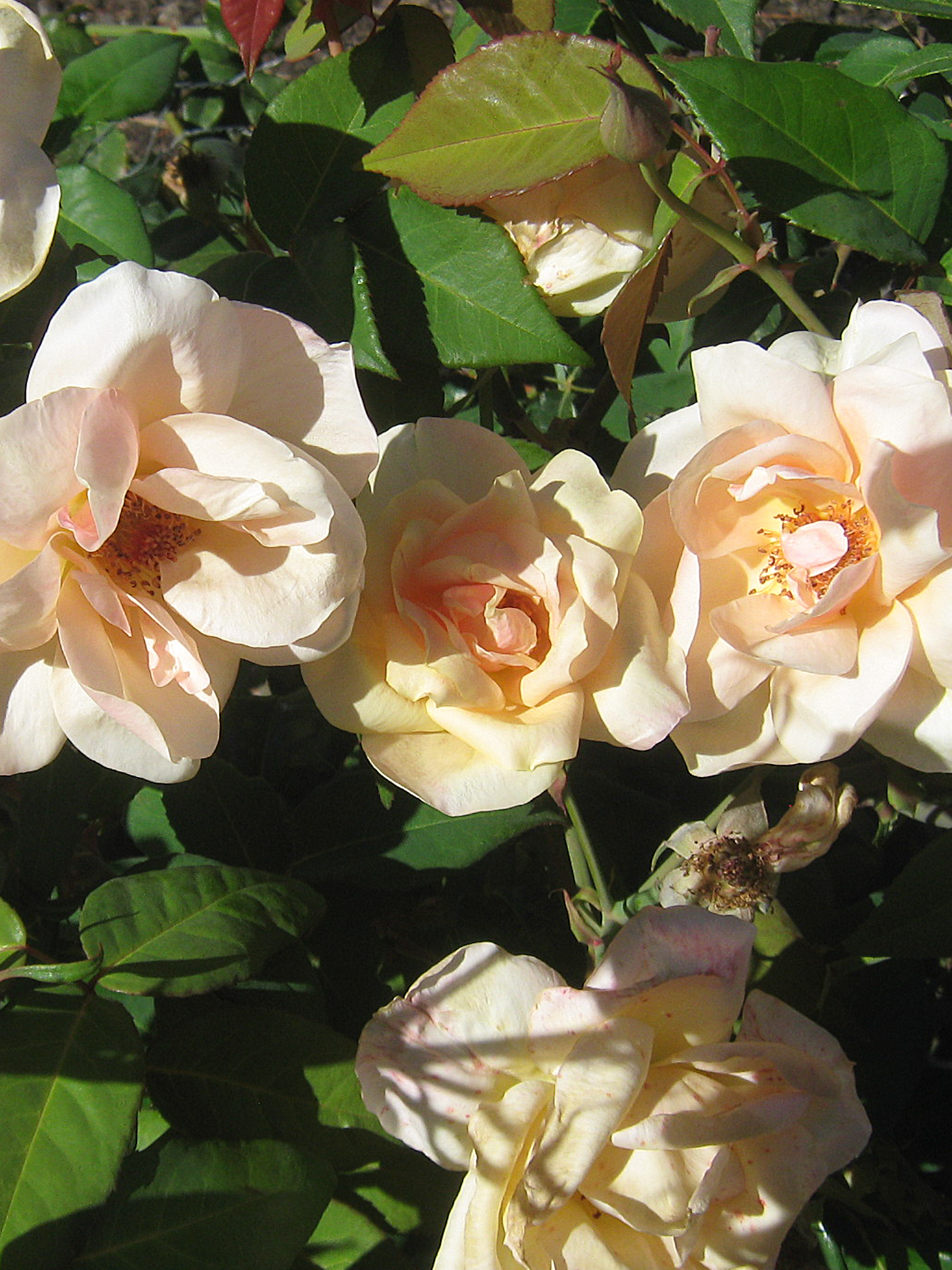
'Baxter Beauty' Found at Baxter VIC before 1937. Tea. Light pink–apricot. A sport of 'Lorraine Lee' (Alister Clark 1938), to which it often reverts.

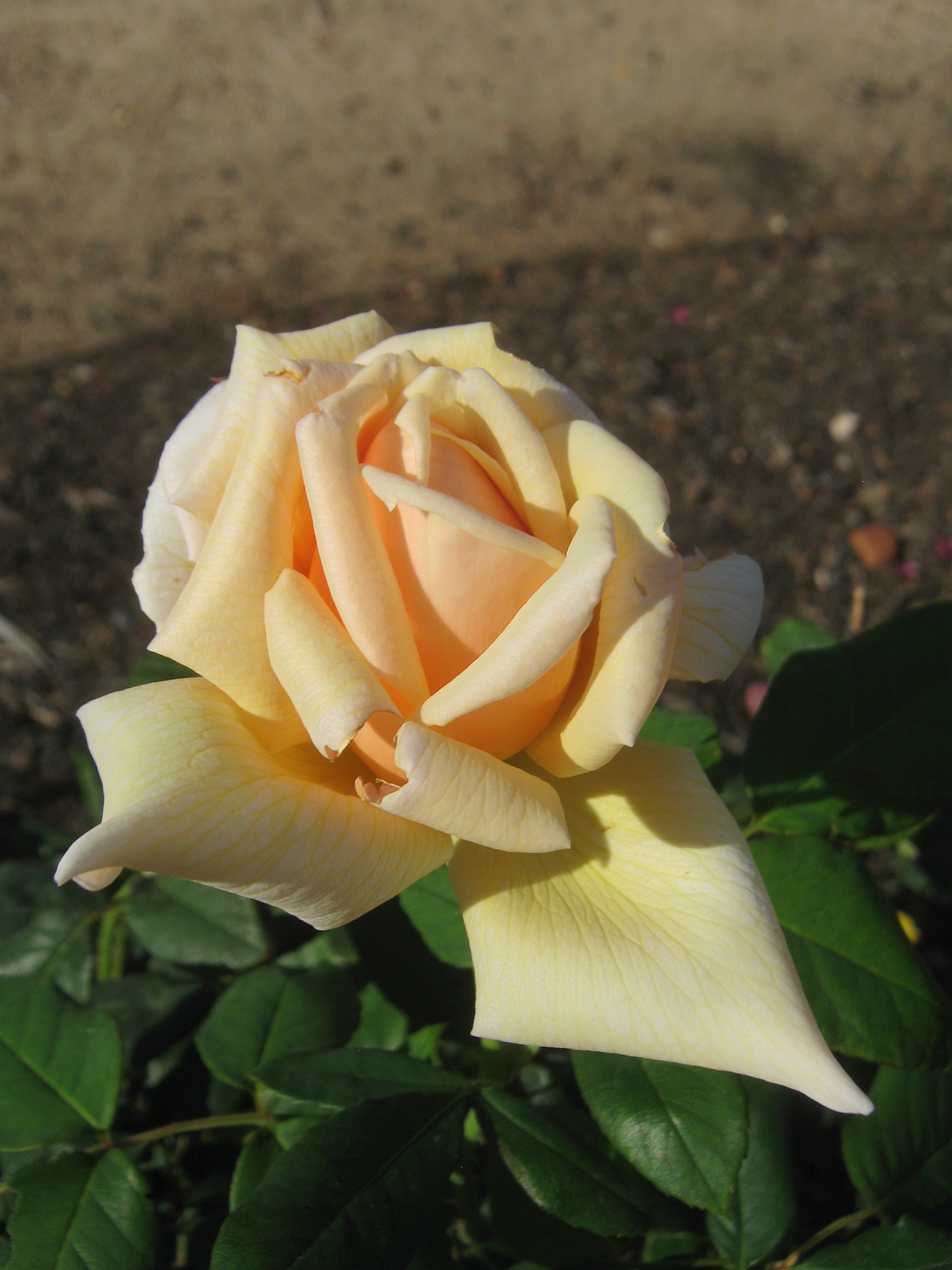
'Joanna Hill' Hill 1928. Hybrid Tea. Yellow flushed orange at the base; classic Hybrid Tea form. Scented but to some noses not scented enough.

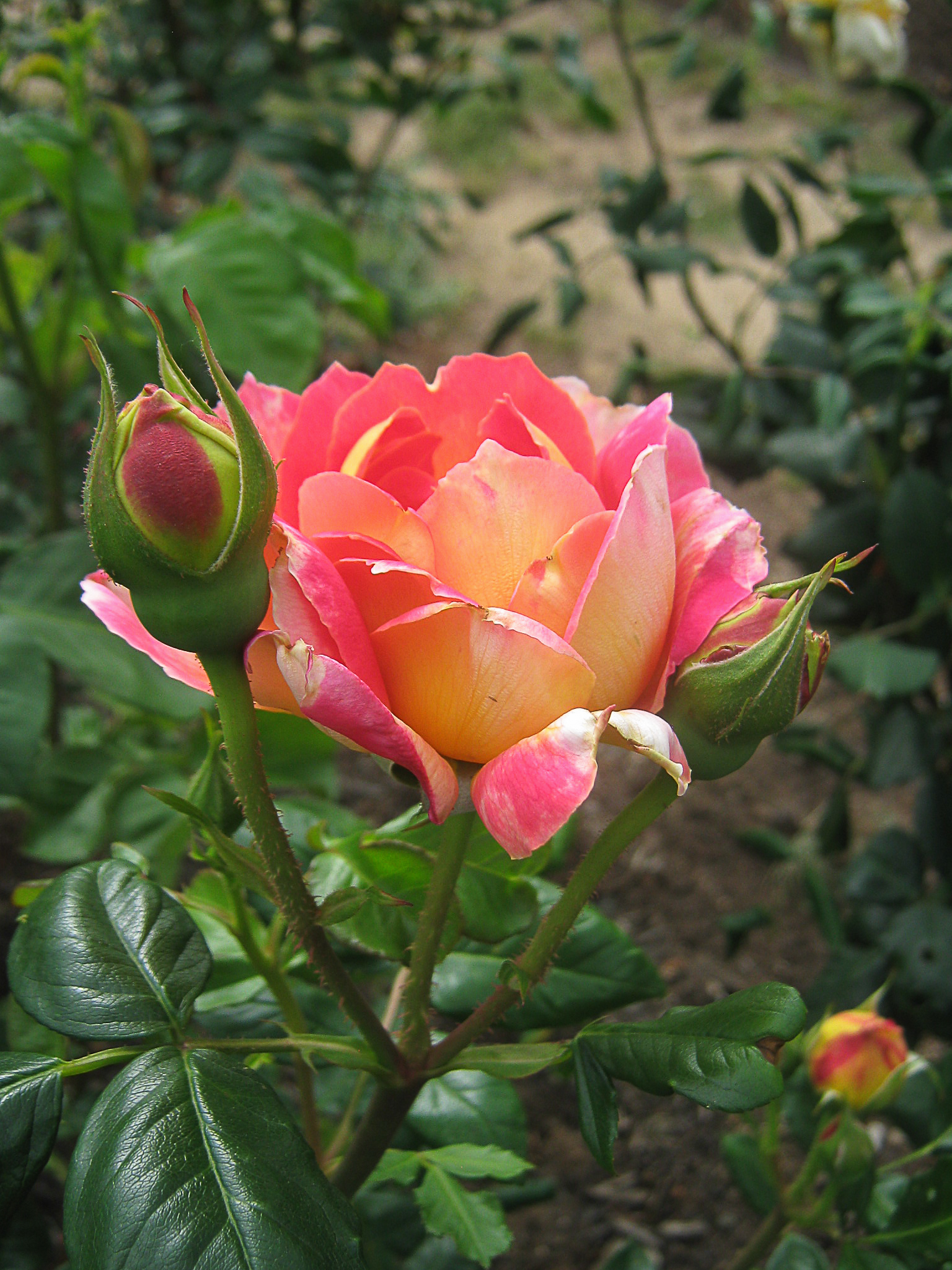
'Condesa de Sástago' Pedro Dot 1930. Hybrid Tea. Bicolour scarlet and yellow; the first bicoloured rose to be well-known. Apple pie and cinnamon scent. The name is Spanish for Countess of Sastago.

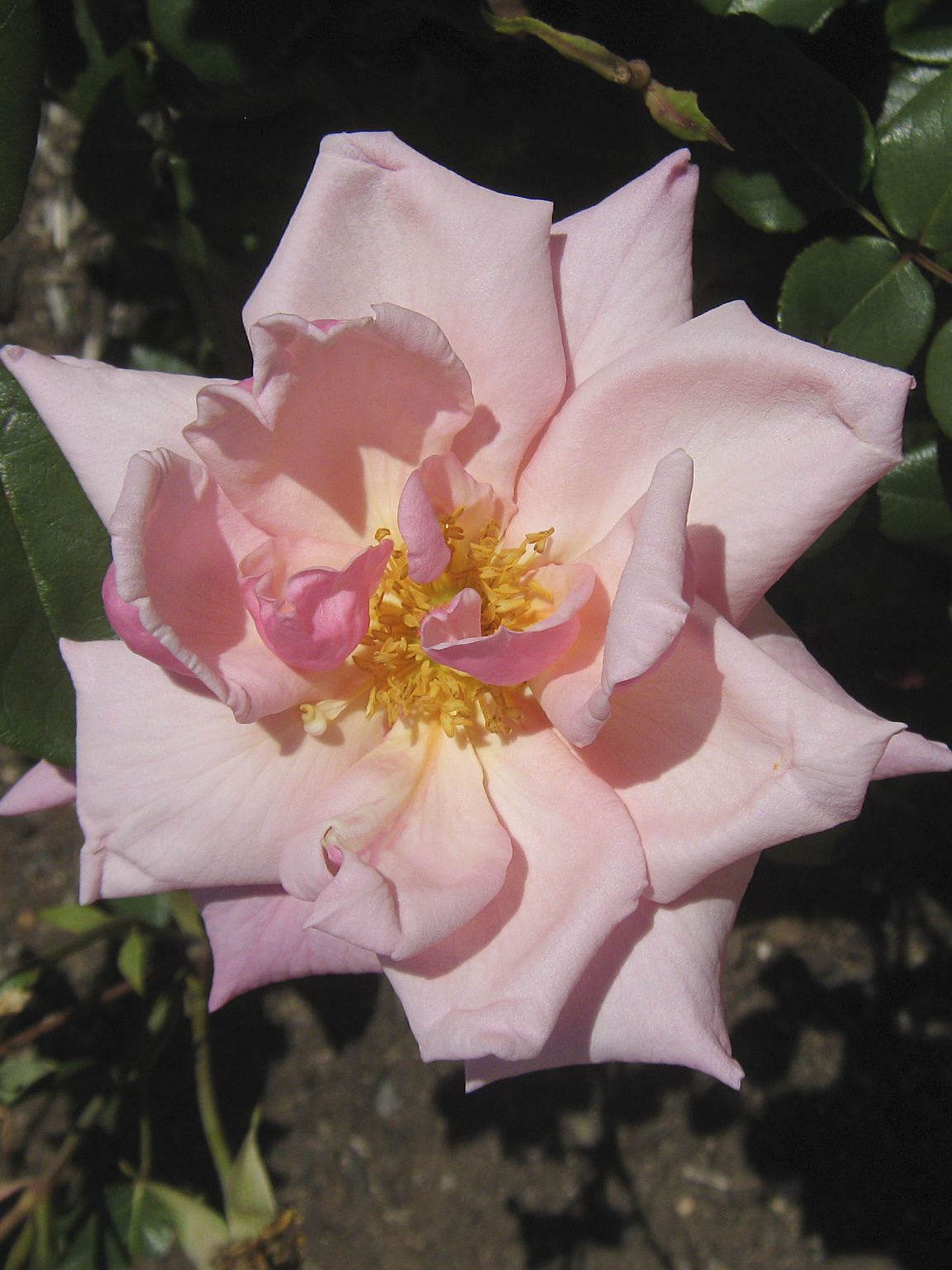
'John C.M. Mensing' Discovered by Eveleens 1924. Hybrid Tea. Pink. A sport of 'Ophelia' sometimes called 'Pink Ophelia'.

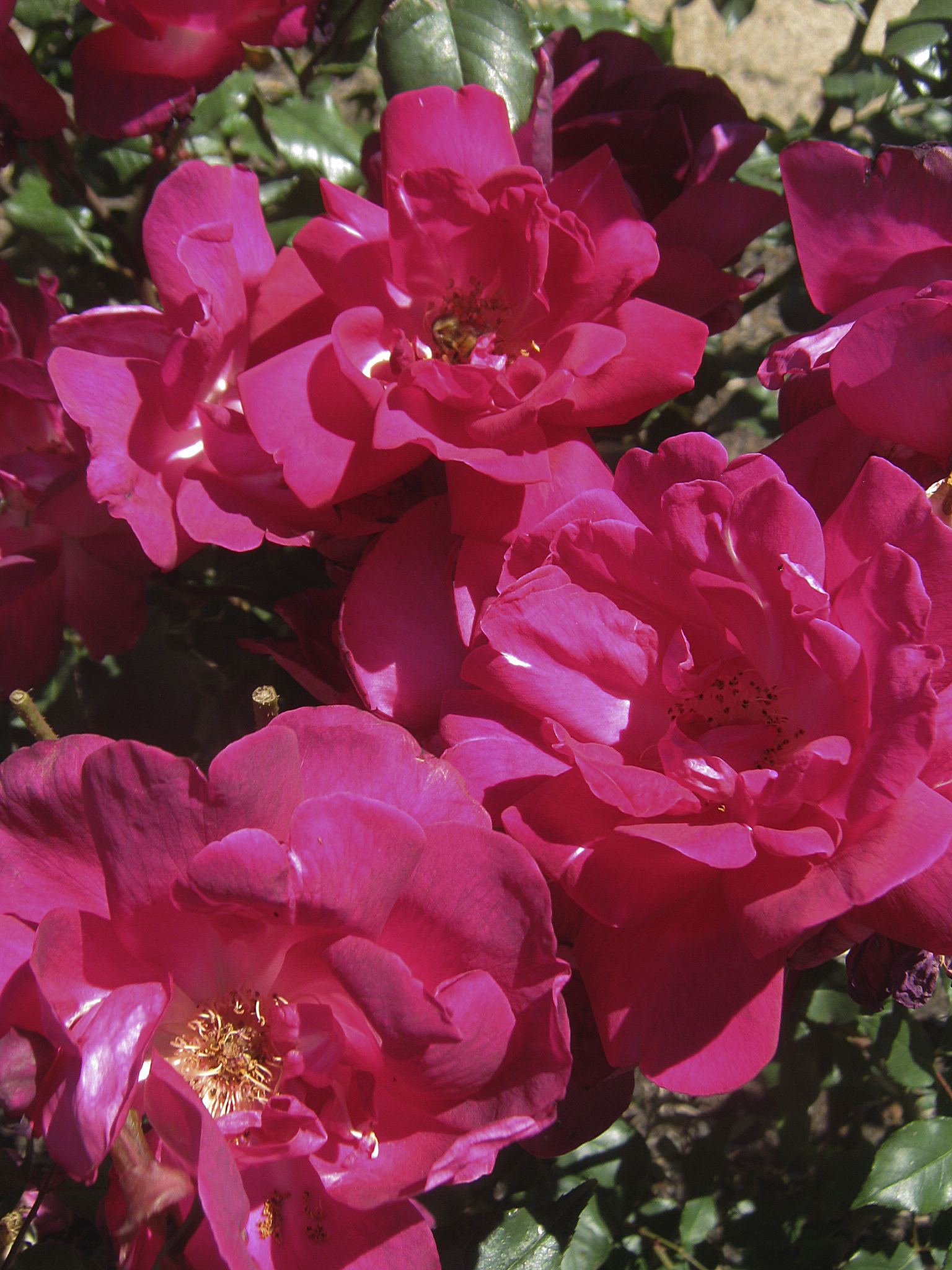
"Camnethan Cherry Red" Foundling from Camnethan House, Smeaton VIC. Tea. Cherry red, turning crimson–blue.

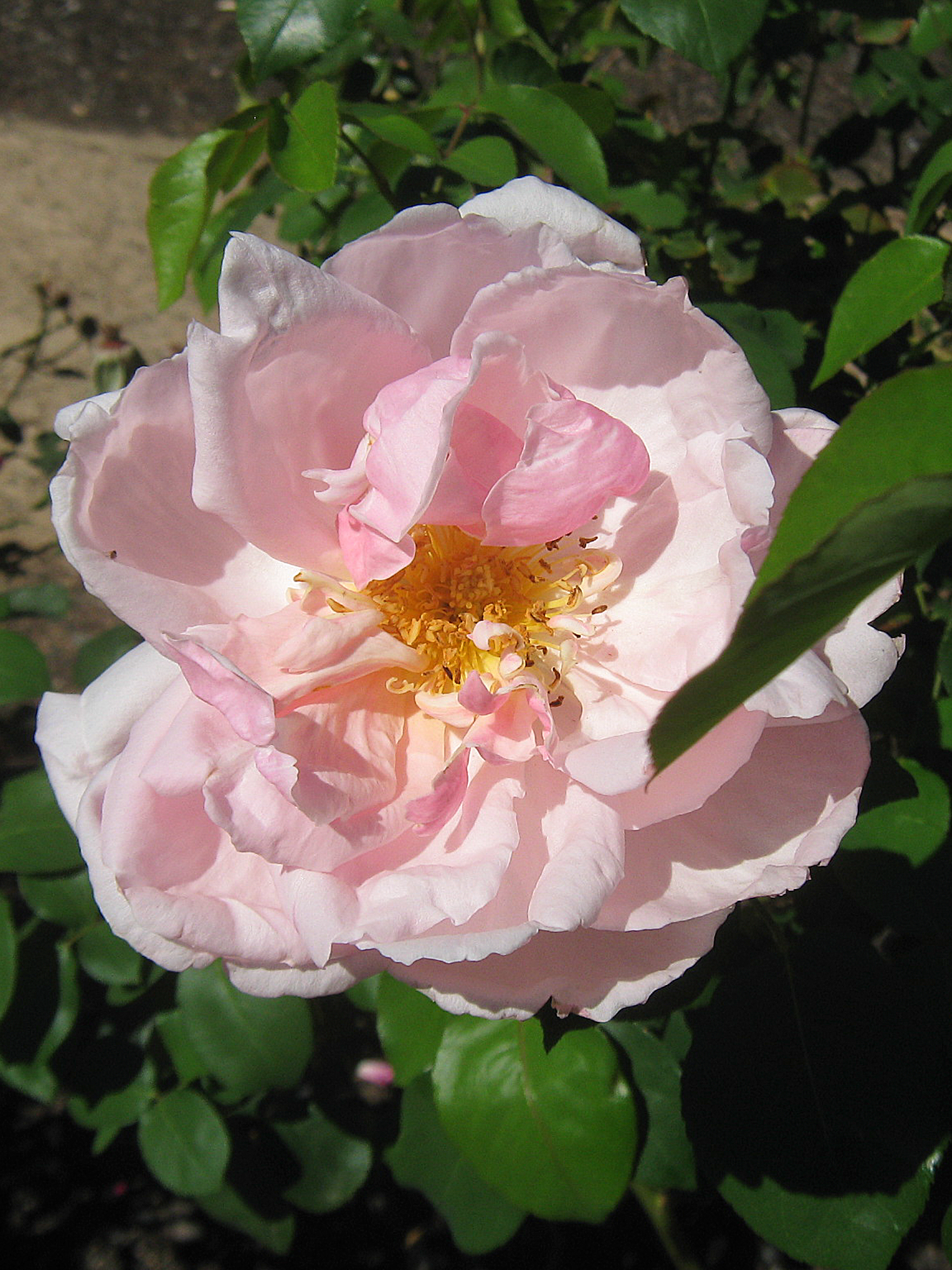
'Mrs Henry Morse' McGredy 1919. HT. Petals are cream tinted rose-pink on the front, pink-veined vermillion on the back. Sweet scented and long-flowering at Maddingley Park. Mrs Morse was wife and mother of rose-breeders.

=== Bed 5 ===
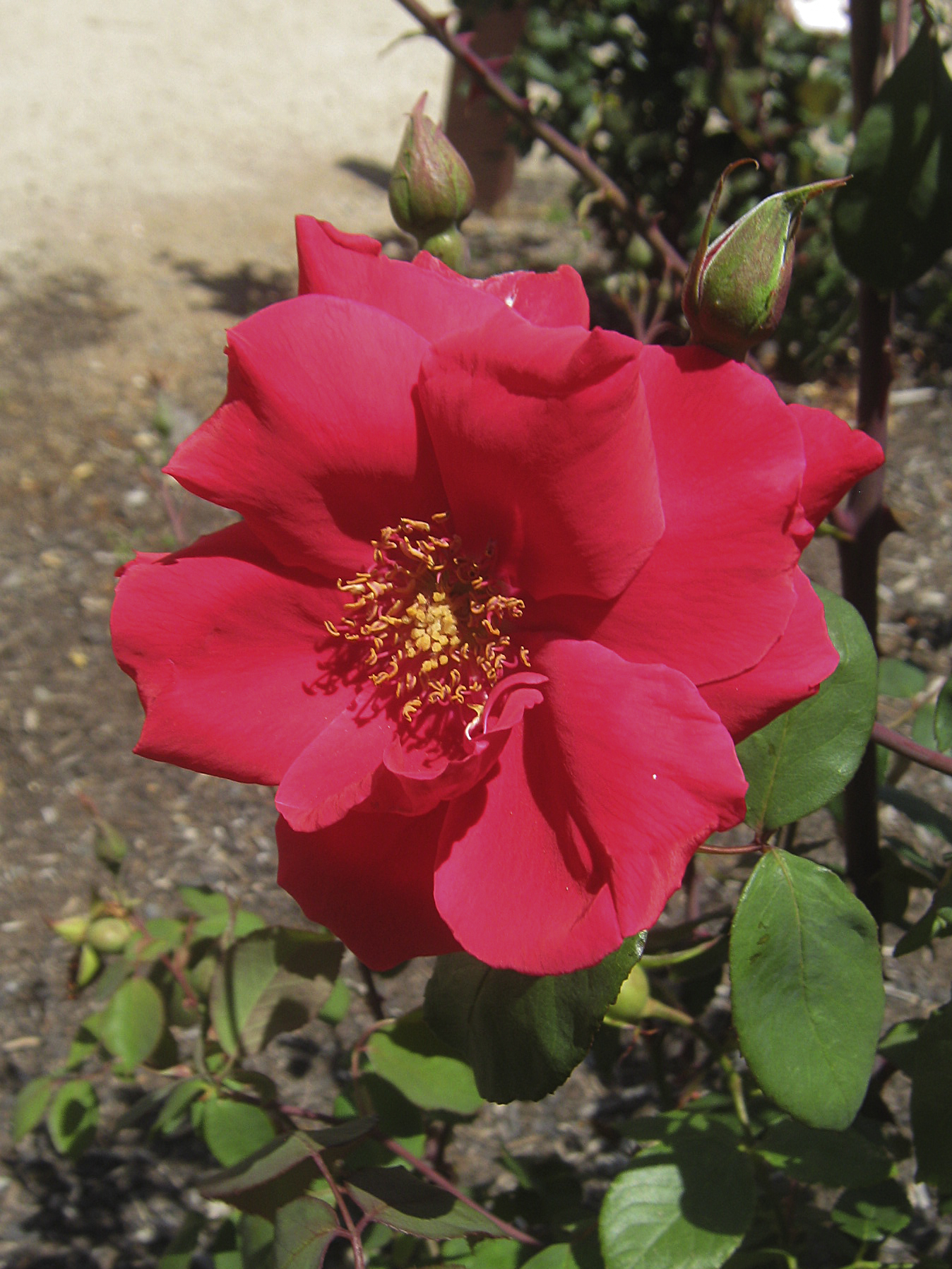
"Bishop's Lodge Linton Boy" Found at Bishop's Lodge, Hay NSW. HT. Bright metallic red with yellow stamens. Semi-double. Thought to be 'Red Letter Day', Dickson, Northern Ireland, 1914.

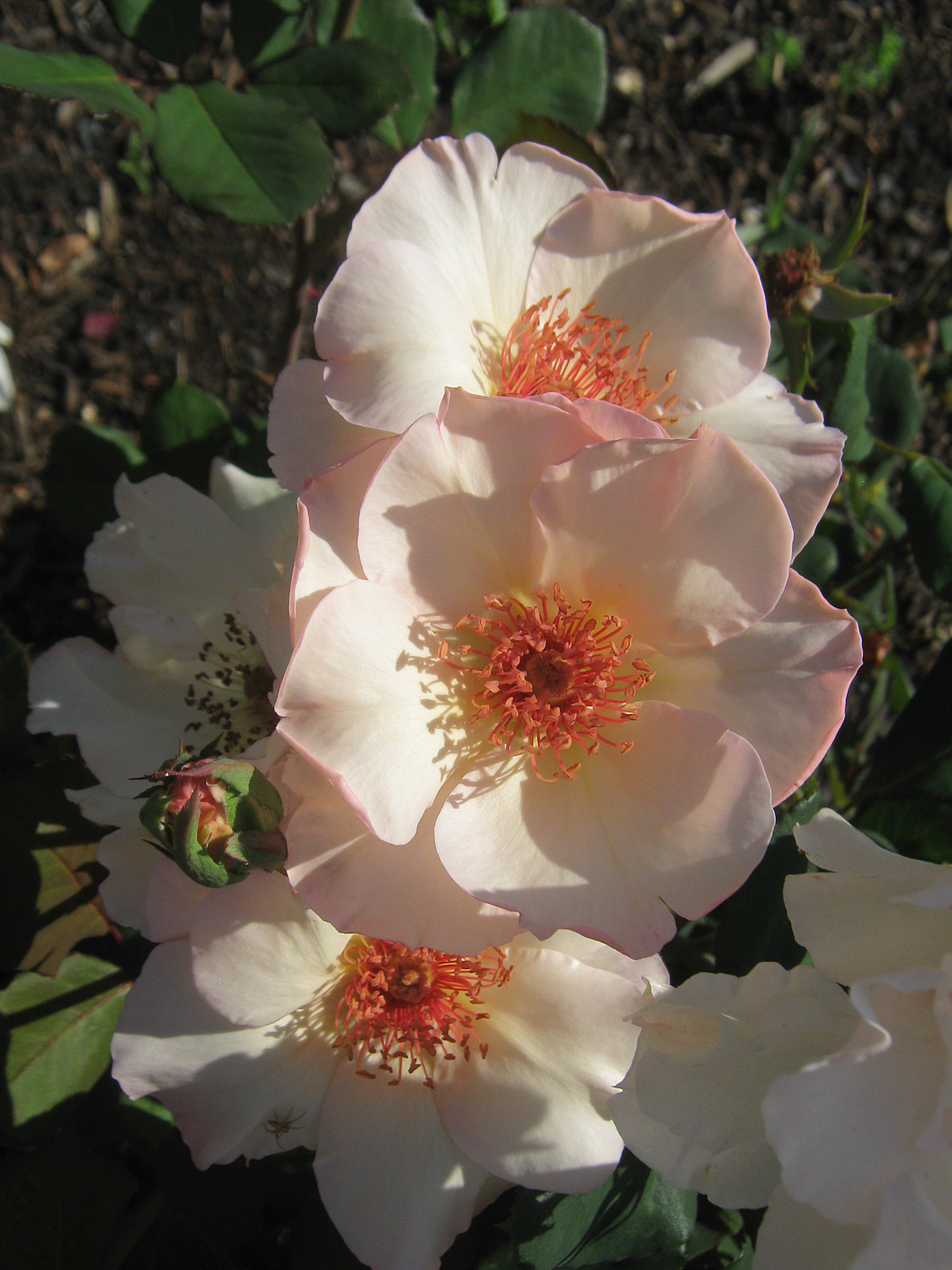
'Ellen Willmott' Archer 1935. Hybrid Tea. Soft pink and orange, single. Miss Willmott was the author of the compendious The Genus Rosa. When this rose was released, she ordered 400 plants of it.

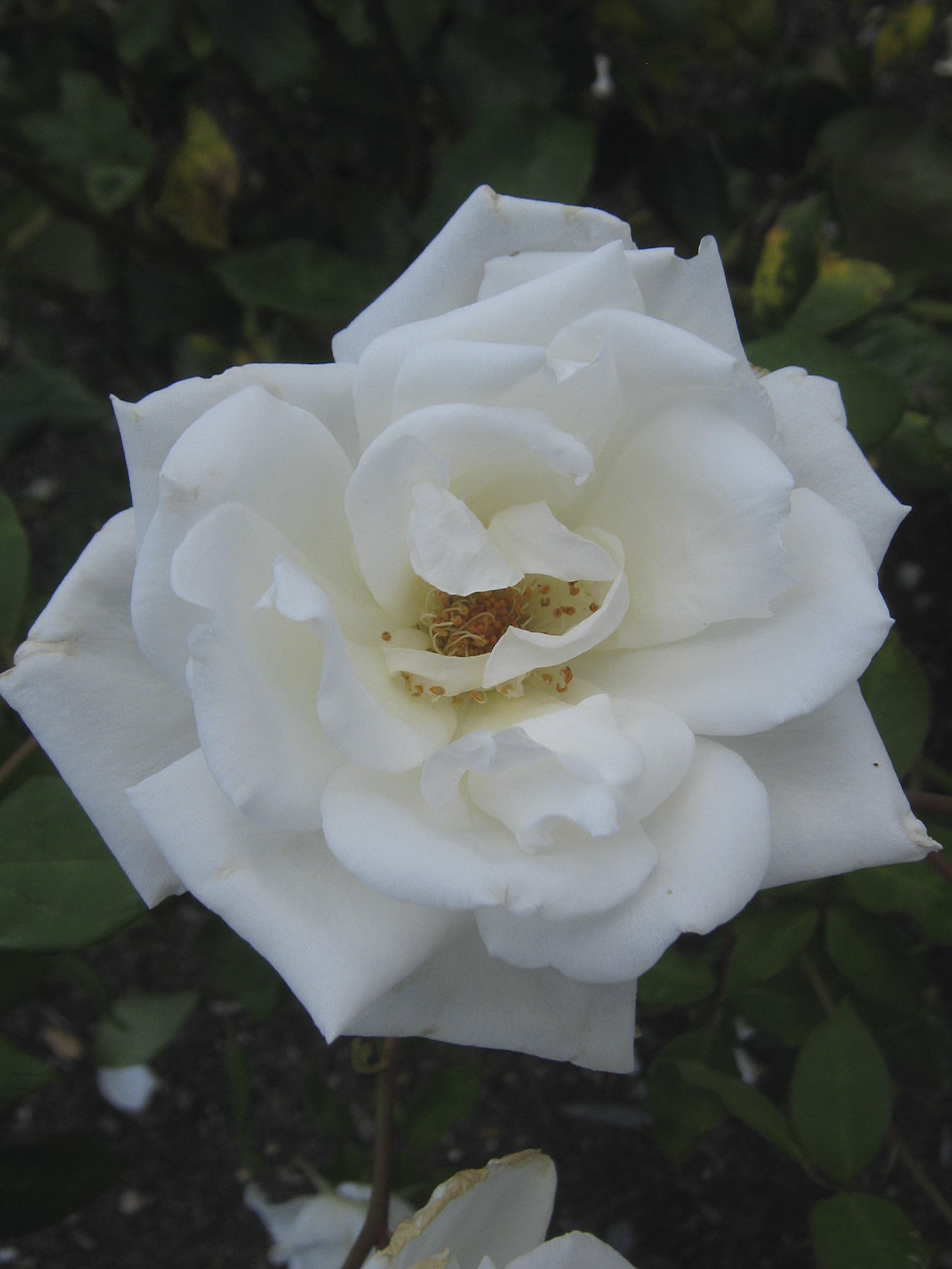
'Mrs Herbert Stevens' McGredy 1910. Hybrid Tea. White with incurved centre petals hiding the stamens. Good tea scent.

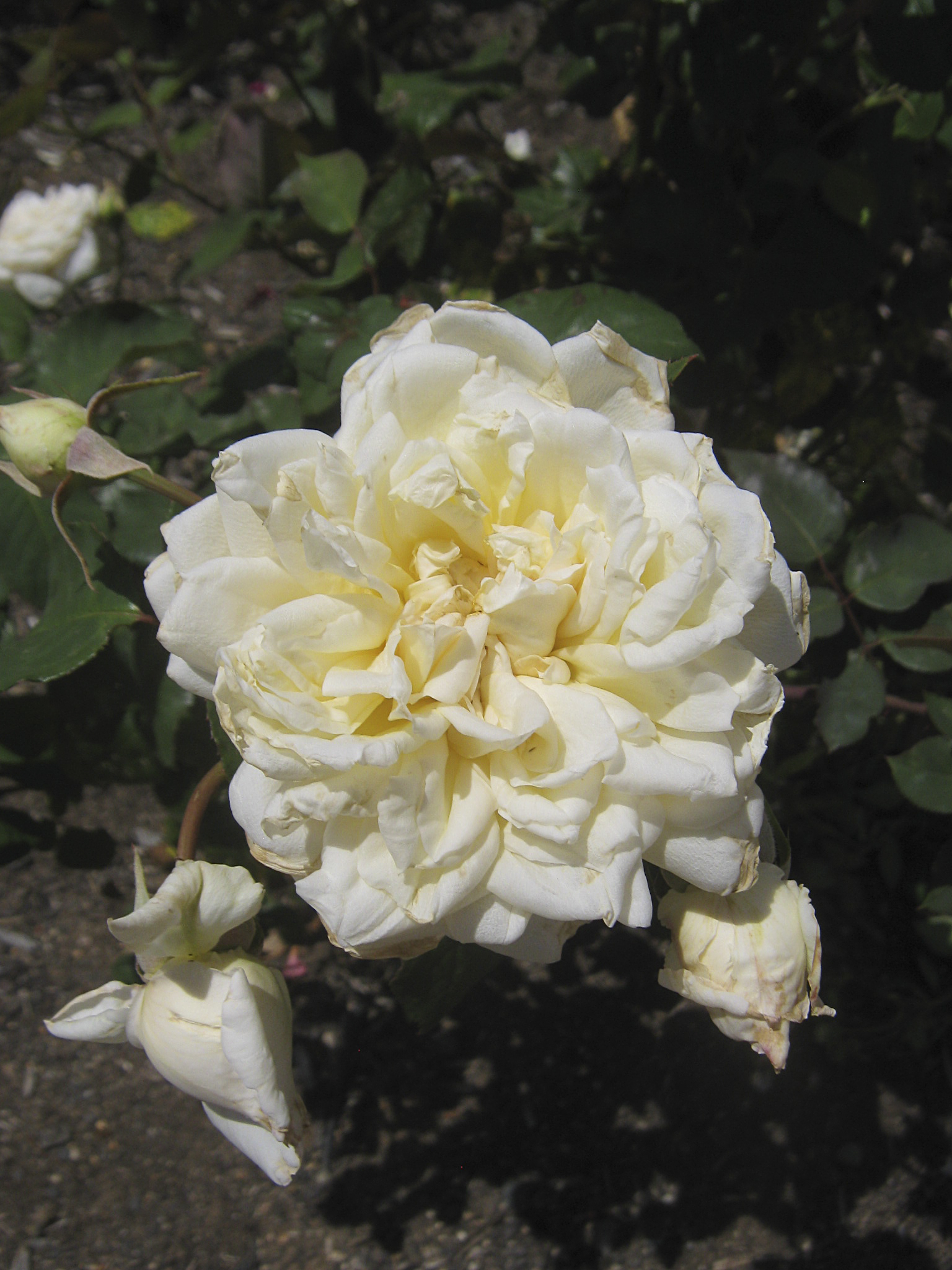
'Kootenay' Dickson 1917. HT. Very double, blush cream and pink. Attempted improvement of 'Kaiserin Auguste Viktoria' (Bed 3). Very good in hot weather only. The Kootenay are a tribe of North American aborigines.

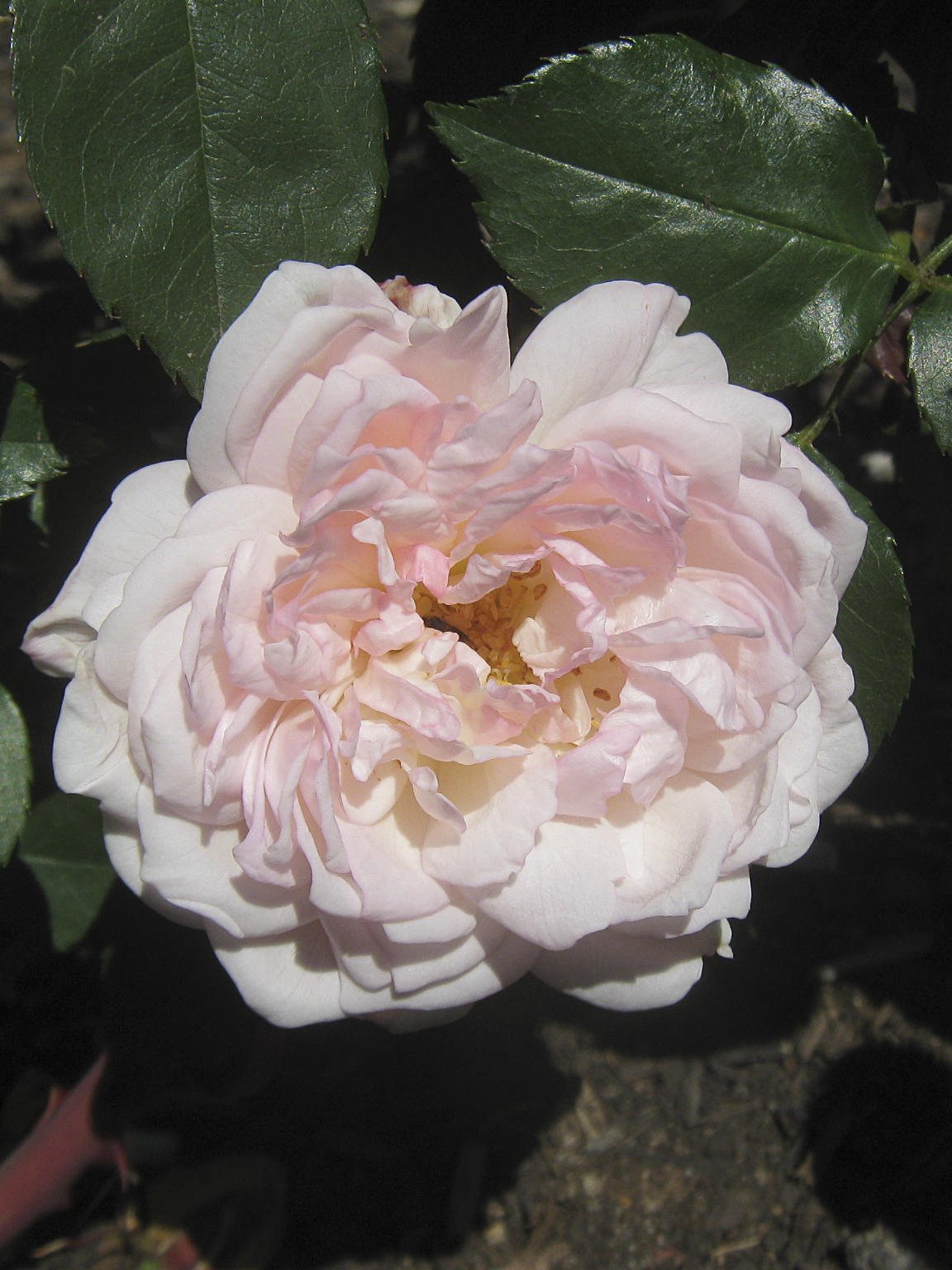
'Mlle de Sombreuil' Robert 1851. Tea. Scented. Opens pink, turning white with pink traces. Found at Carlsruhe, South Australia on the grave of Maria Brühn. Thought to be the true original of this rose.

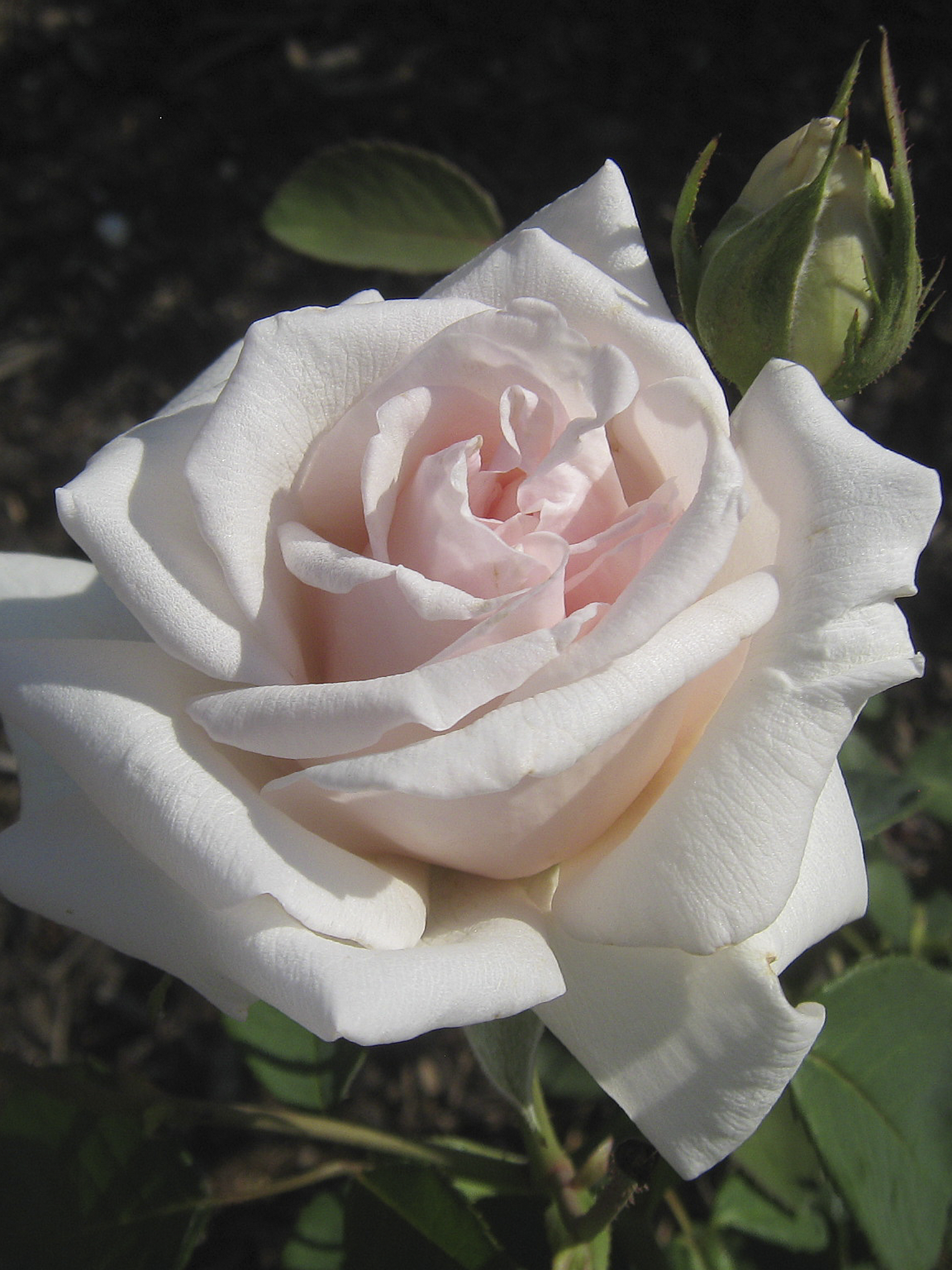
'Lady Edgeworth David' Olive Fitzhardinge, Sydney 1939. HT. Similar pink to 'Souvenir de la Malmaison', mild scent. Lady David was a Warrawee neighbour and friend of the breeder.

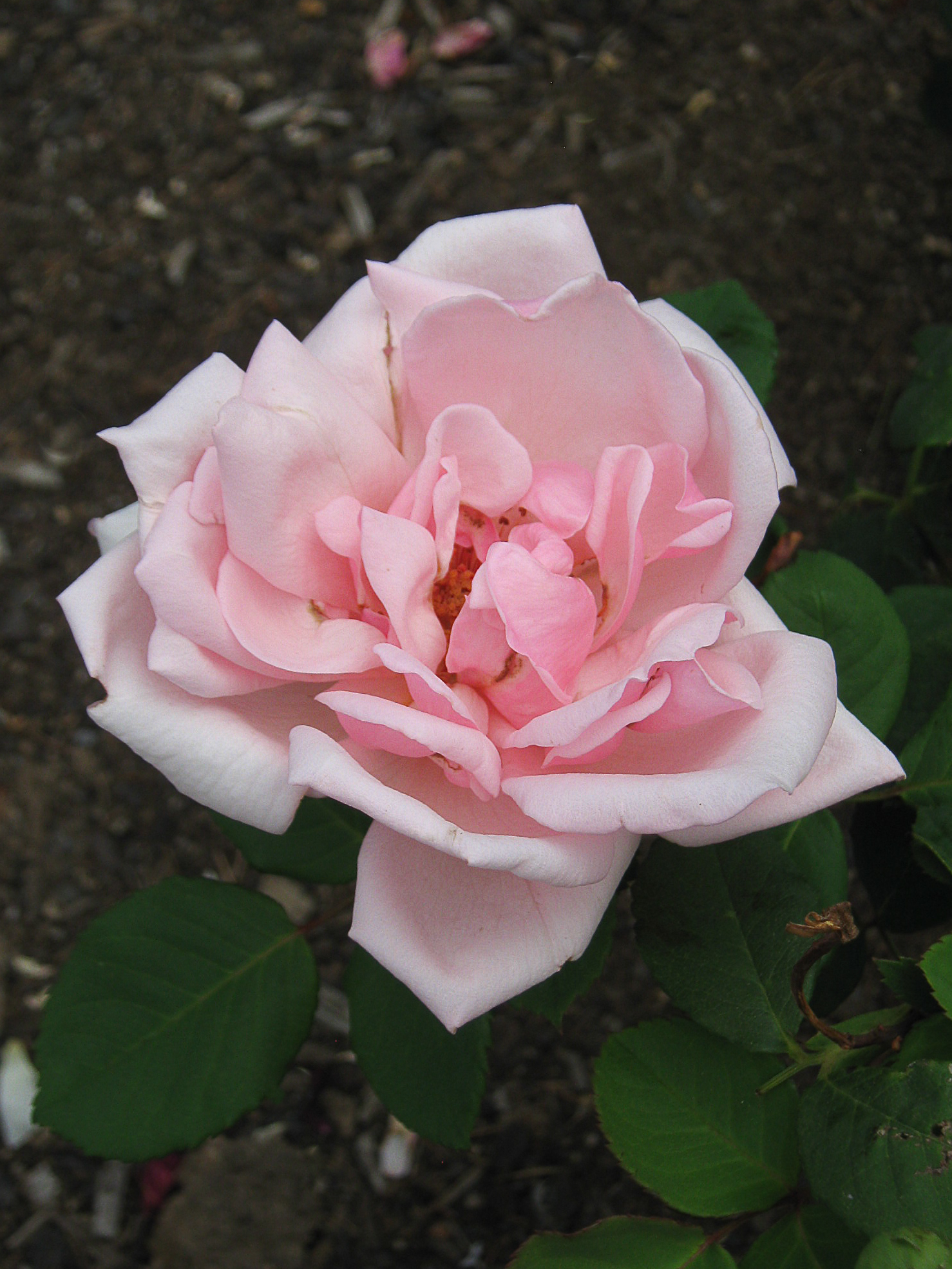
'Warrawee' Olive Fitzhardinge, Sydney 1932. Strongly scented, shaded pink Hybrid Tea. Named after the suburb and its society in which Fitzhardinge lived.

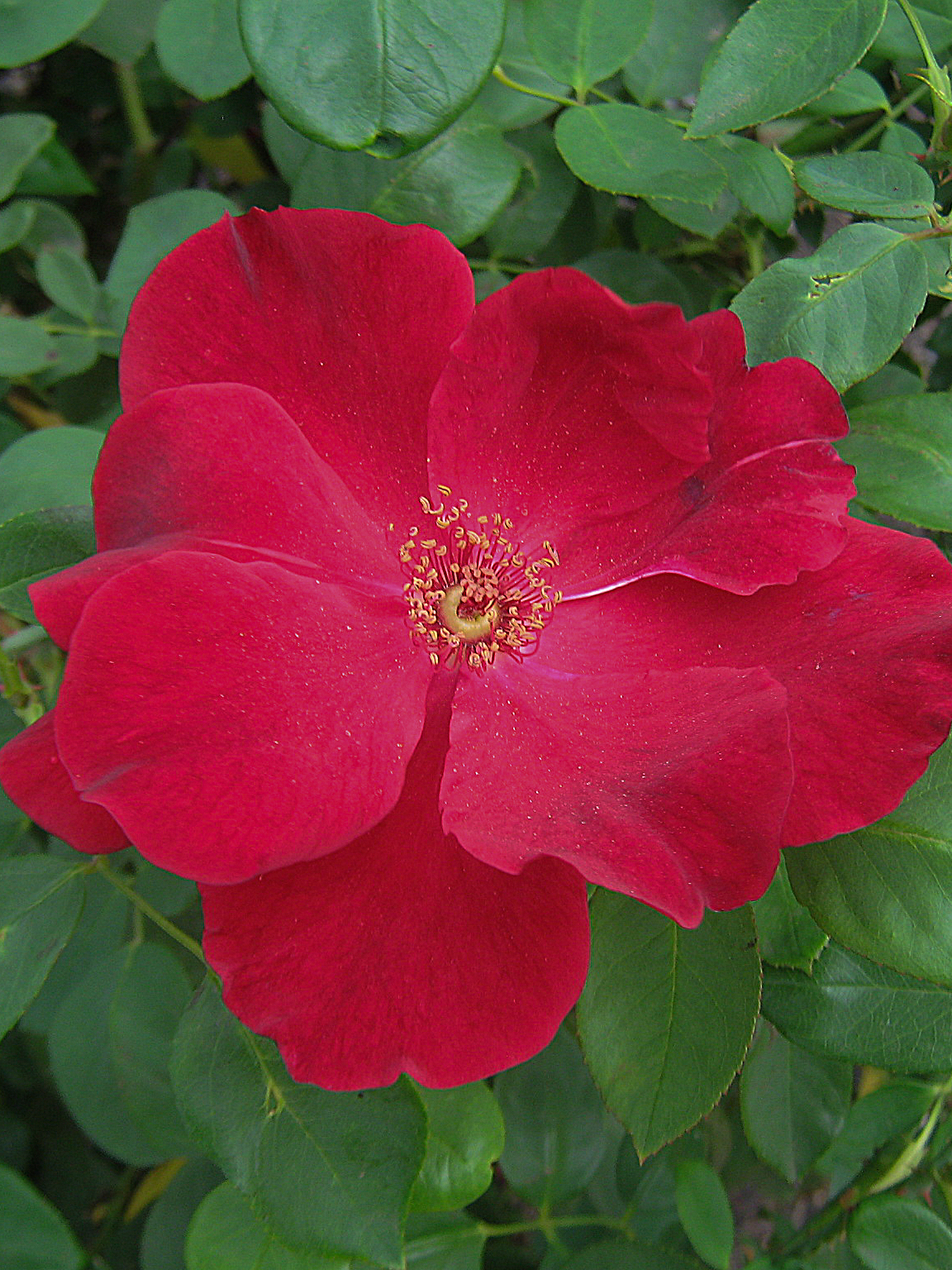
'Midnight Sun' Patrick Grant, Macksville NSW 1921. HT. Semi-double crimson-black with black buds and good scent. From the garden of Mary Allen of Helora, near Warragul VIC, when she was 96.

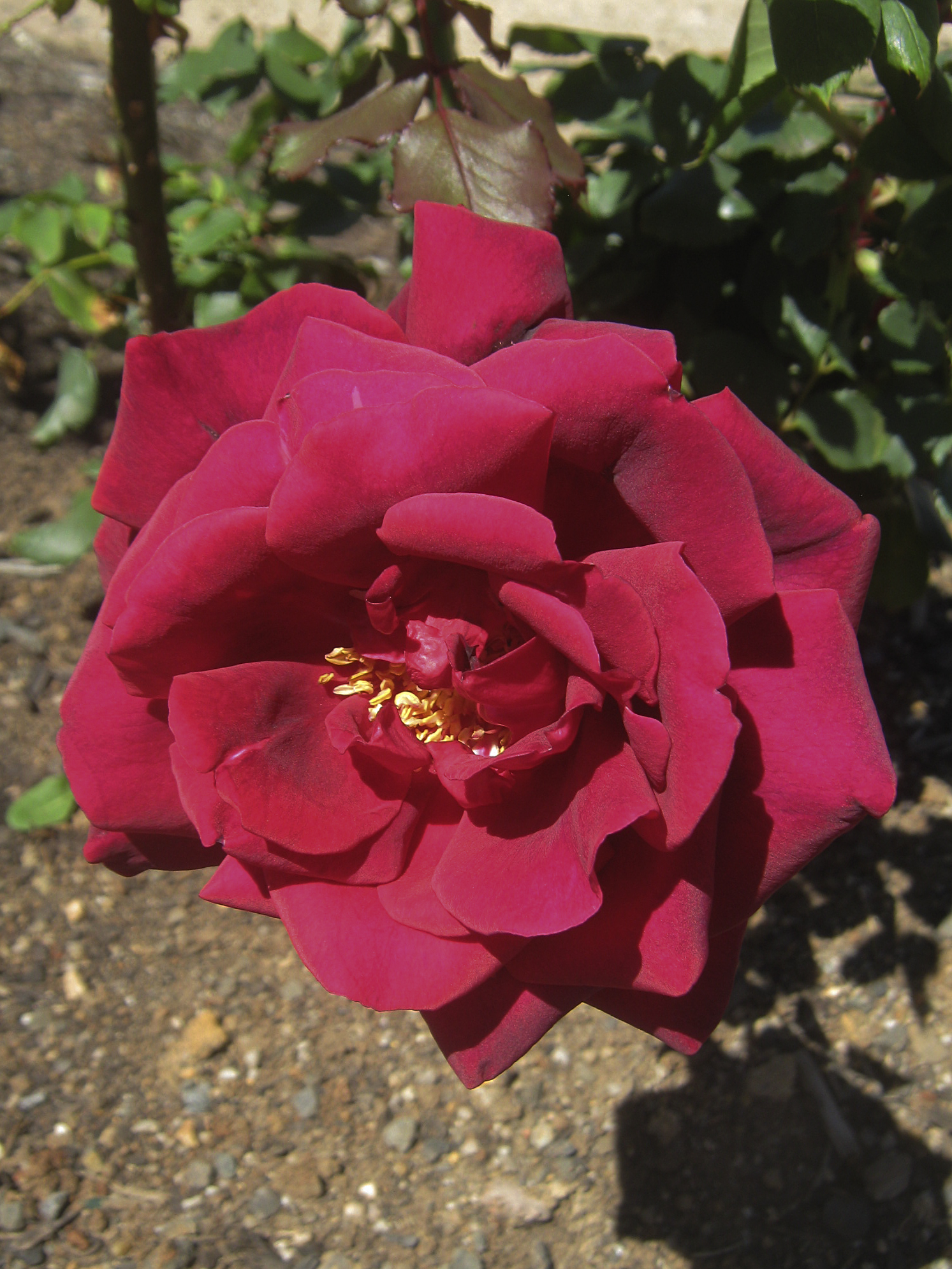
'Crimson Glory' Kordes 1935. Hybrid Tea. Richly scented, pure red. Blooms look sideways more often than up. For 30 years the most favoured dark red rose. Two plants.

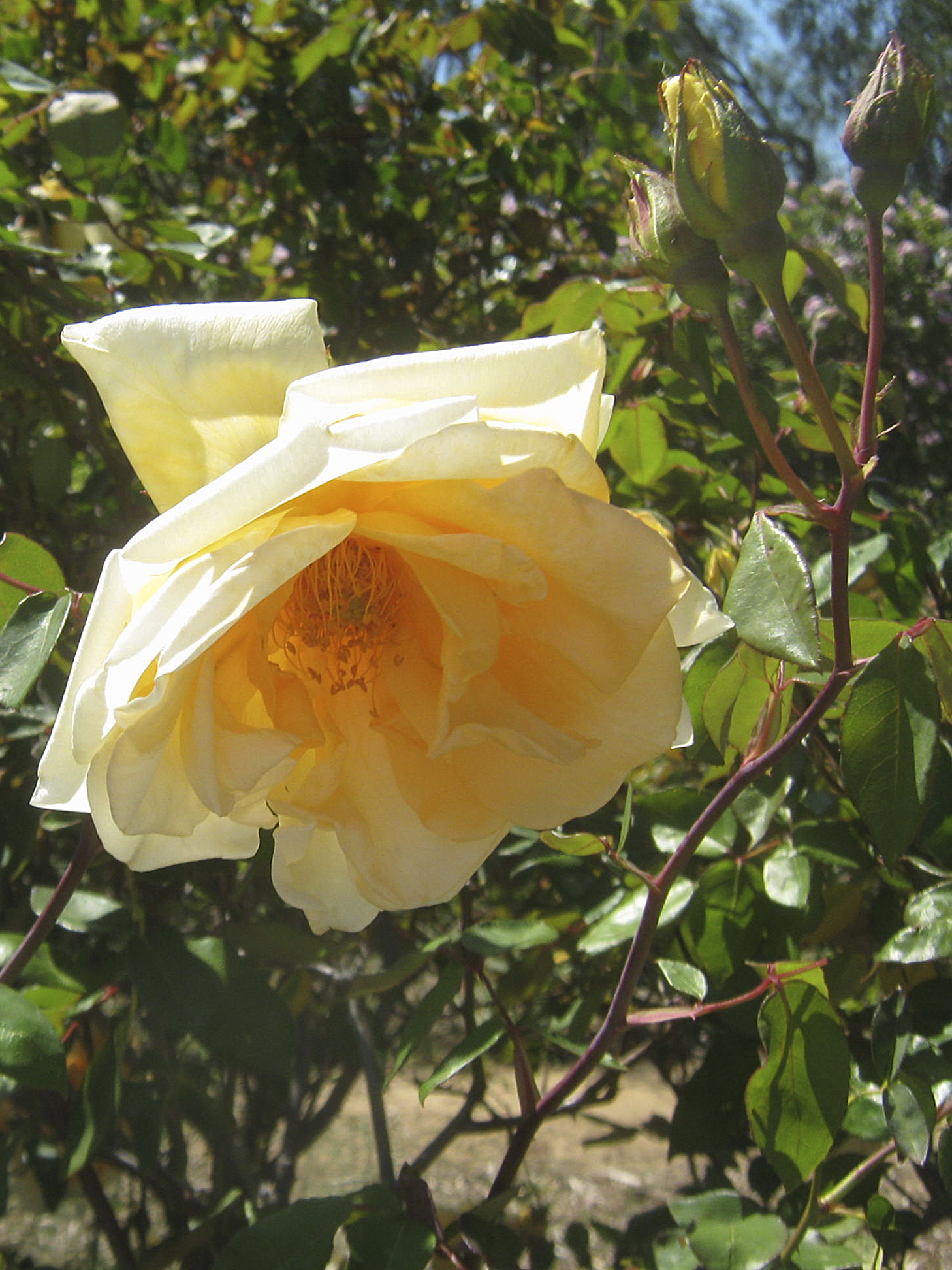
"Bishop's Lodge Linton Gold" Found at Bishop's Lodge, Hay NSW. Tea. Recurrent blooms of gold to ochre and classic Hybrid Tea form, slightly nodding. New growth is very red, indicating tea blood. There are rose hips when the flowers are not dead headed. Lady Hillingdon's more formal sister.

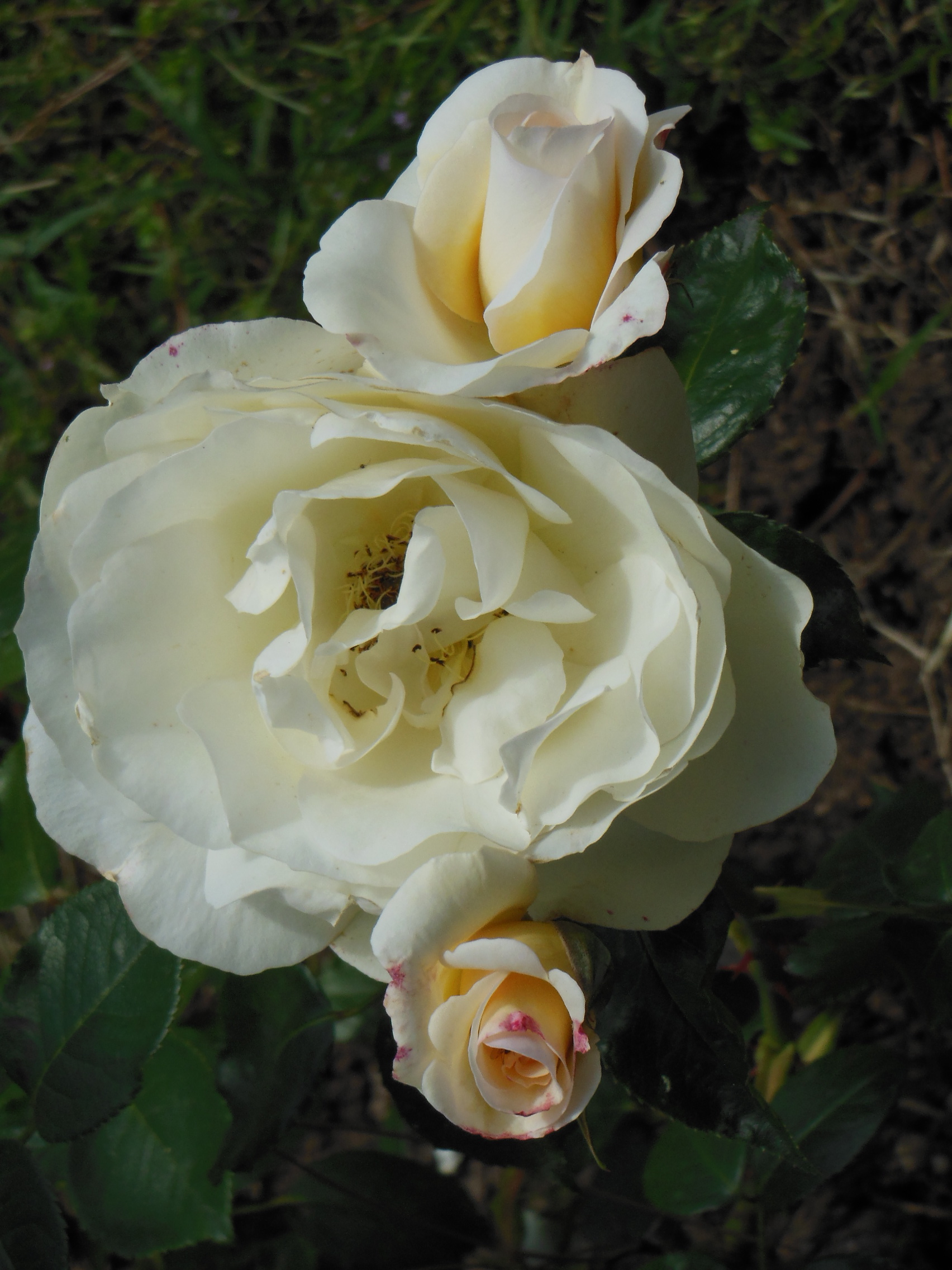
'Ophelia' Blooms in flushes all season. Strong, sweet scent. The great classic hybrid tea of the between-war period, bred in France but released by Paul and Son in England in 1912. The parent and model of hundreds of roses of the 1920s and 1930s.

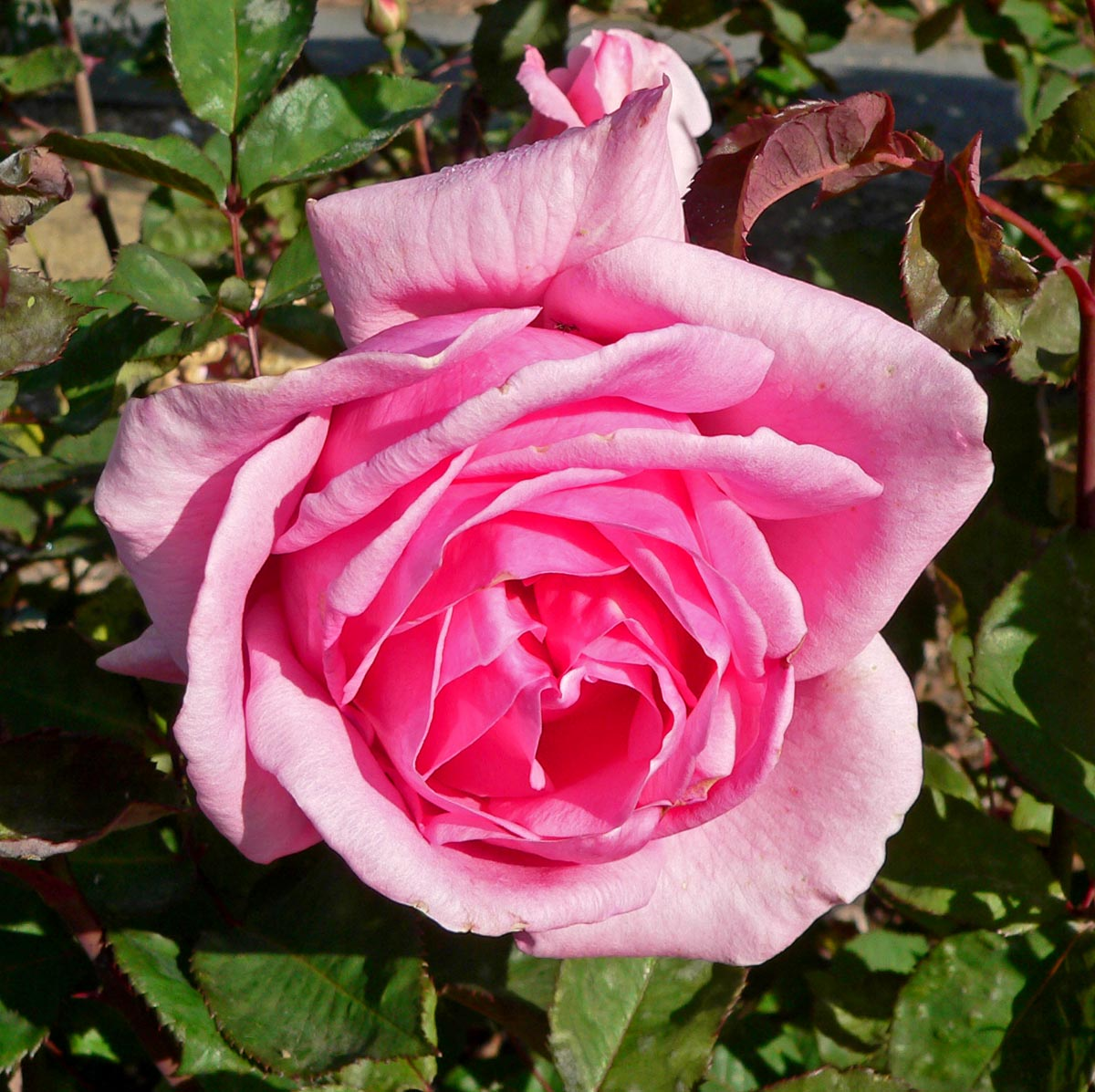
"Rod Stillman" Strongly scented light pink double hybrid tea, an 'Ophelia' cross. Bred in 1949 by Robert Hamilton, sometime secretary of the Rose Society of Victoria, and named after a fellow member.

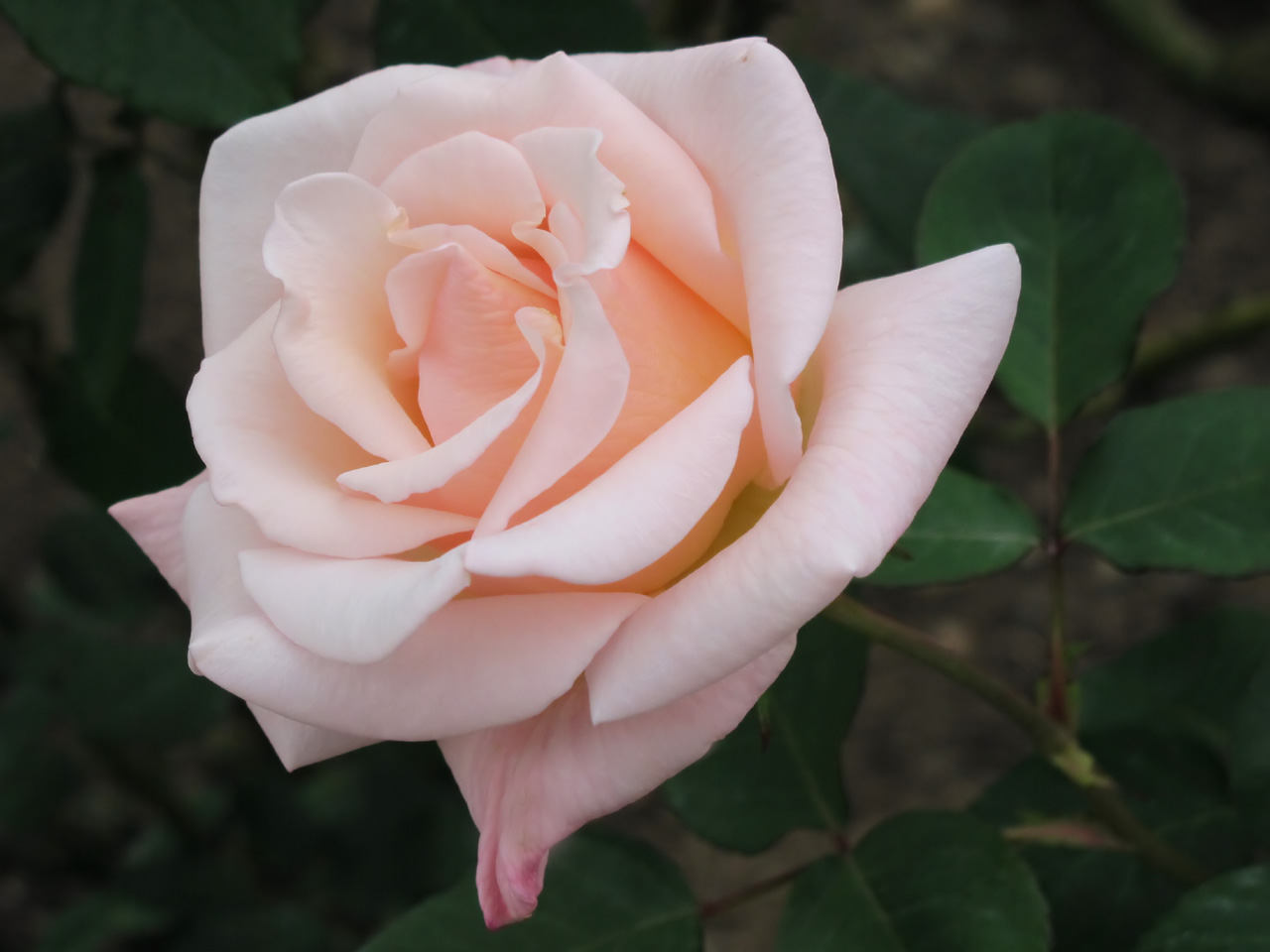
"Madame Butterfly" Honey-scented apricot–pink sport of 'Ophelia' 1918, named after the heroine of Puccini's opera.

=== Bed 6 ===
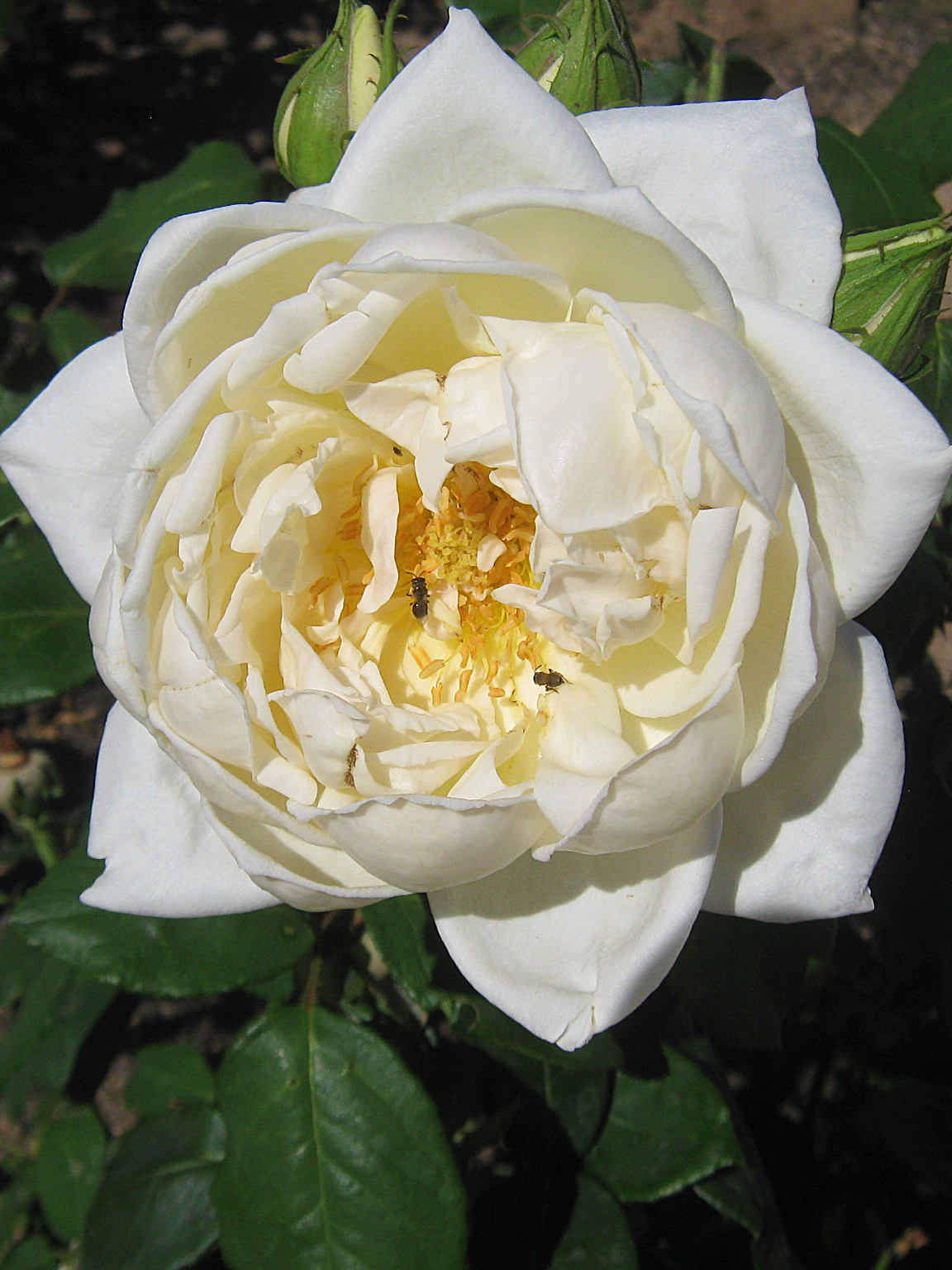
"C. W. Ellis" Hybrid Tea found on Ellis's grave at Mitcham SA. White, semi-double with open yellow stamens. Lemon scent. Colonised by ants, which pollinate it. This rose is a rarity, almost impossible to strike from cuttings. Thought to be 'Mrs David McKee', Dickson, Northern Ireland, 1904.

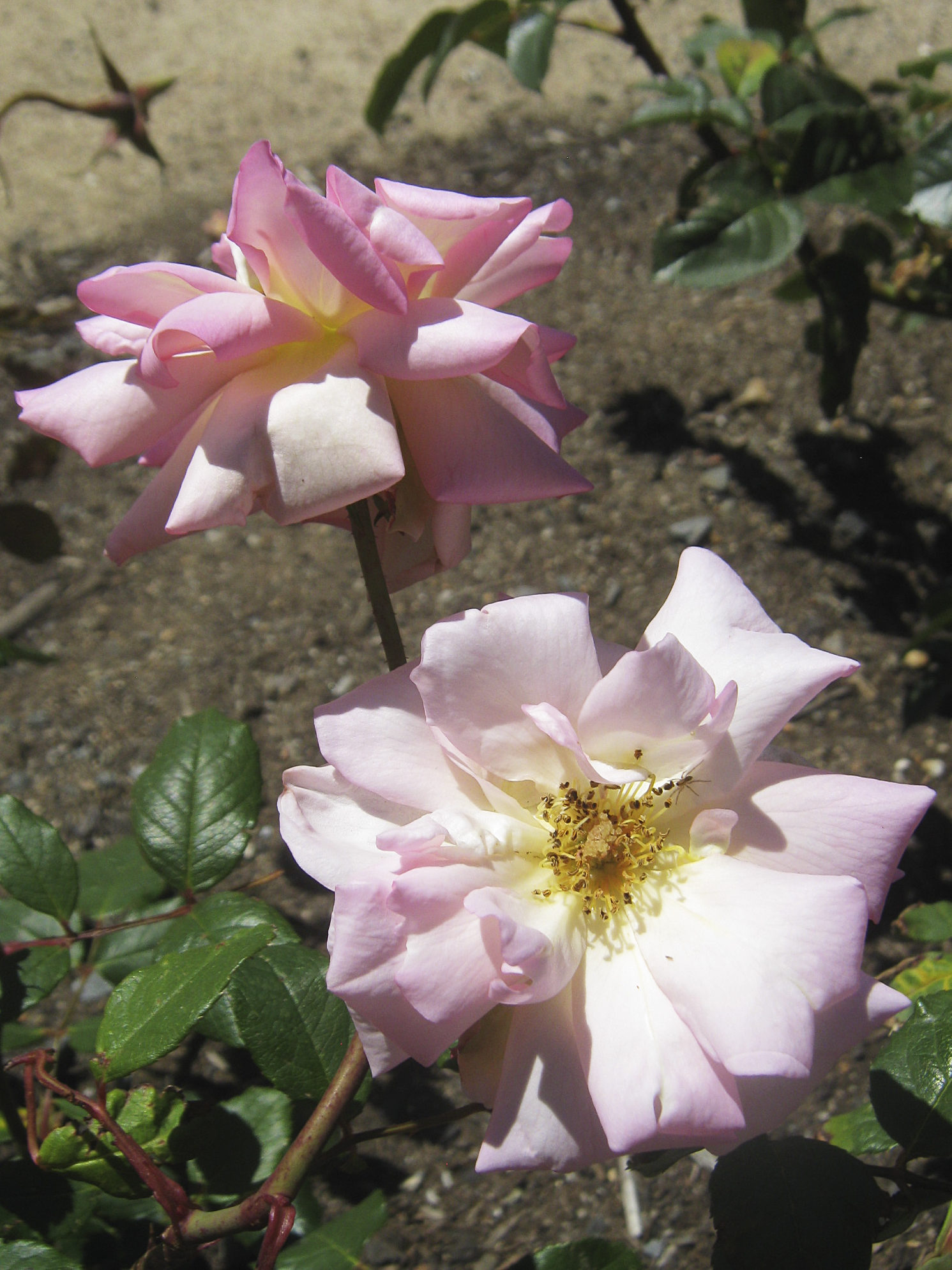
'Sunny South' Alister Clark 1918. Hybrid Tea. Tall, pink semi-double. Constantly in flower, it was a very popular hedging rose in southern Australia between the wars.

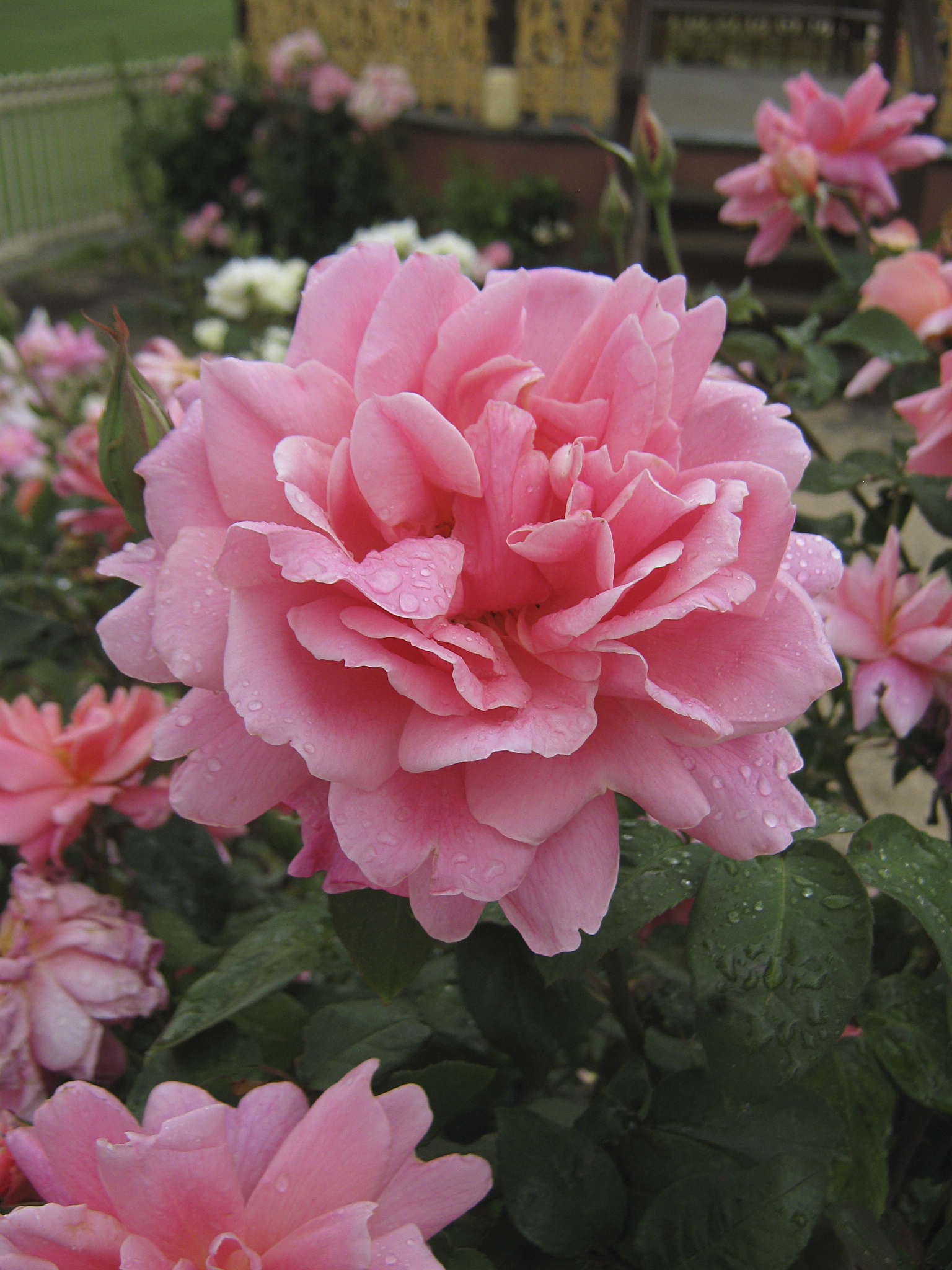
'Mission Bells' Morris 1949. Hybrid Tea. Vermillion pink, long lasting, few thorns. Always in flower and with beautiful Hybrid Tea form. Strong, sweet scent.

=== Hedges ===
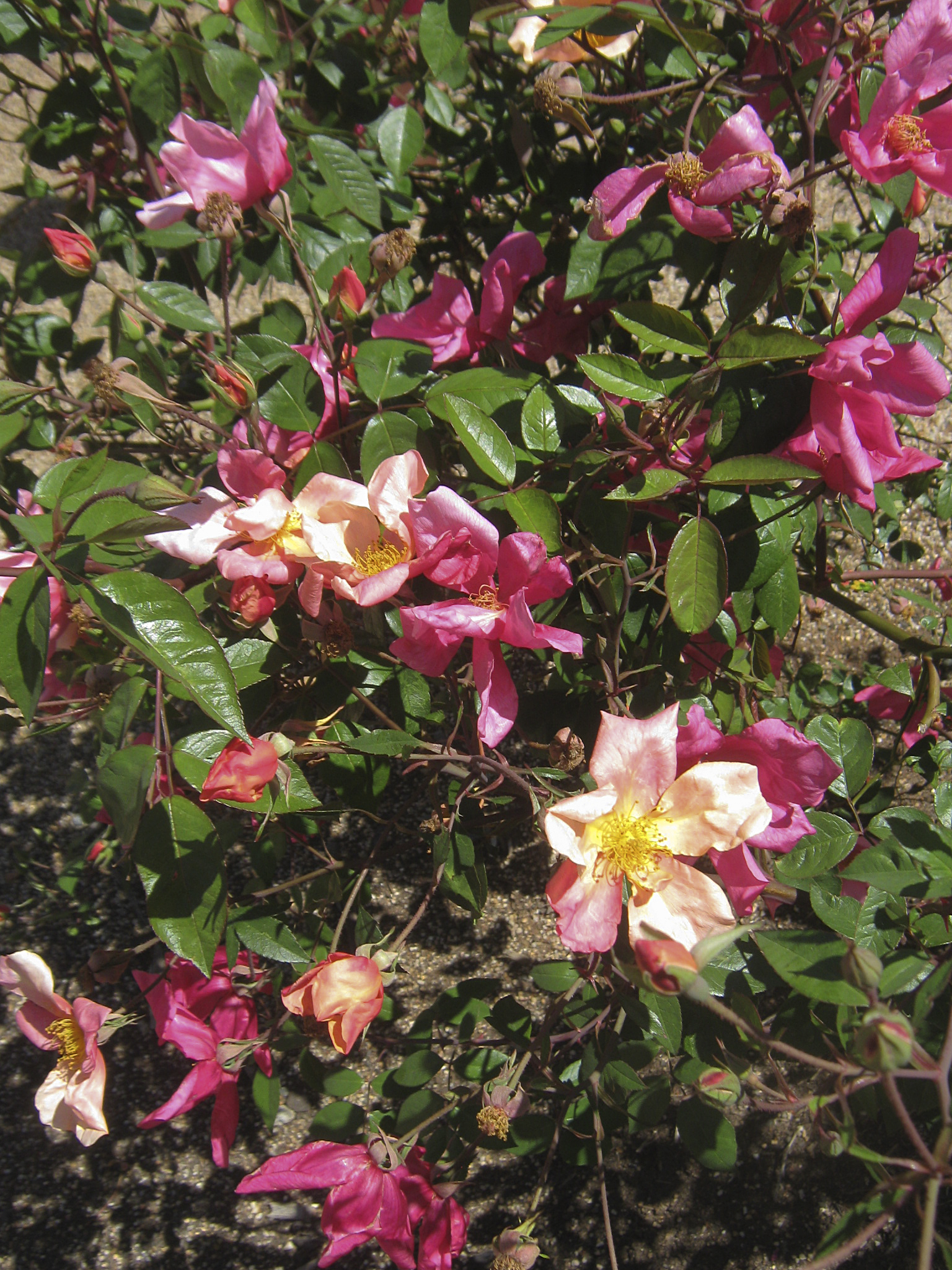
'Mutabilis' Ancient Chinese garden rose. Yellow changing to pink and crimson. Few thorns, moderate fragrance, continuous flowering.

=== Bandstand ===
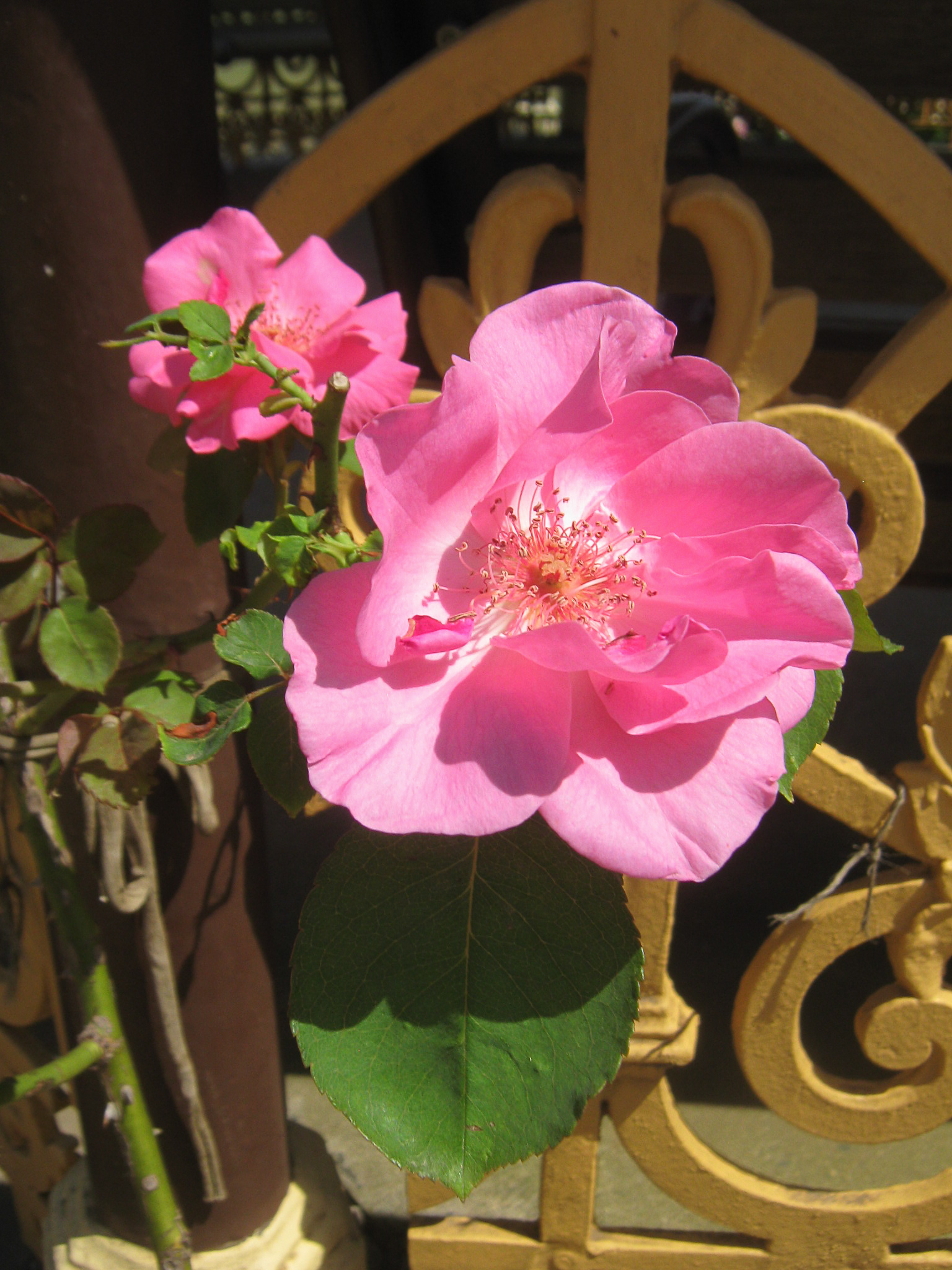
"Miss Madden's Climber". Thought to be by Alister Clark. Continuous flowering climber found on the Badger Creek, Victoria property of Alison Madden (1899—1987), a friend of his. Photographed against the Maddingley Park bandstand.

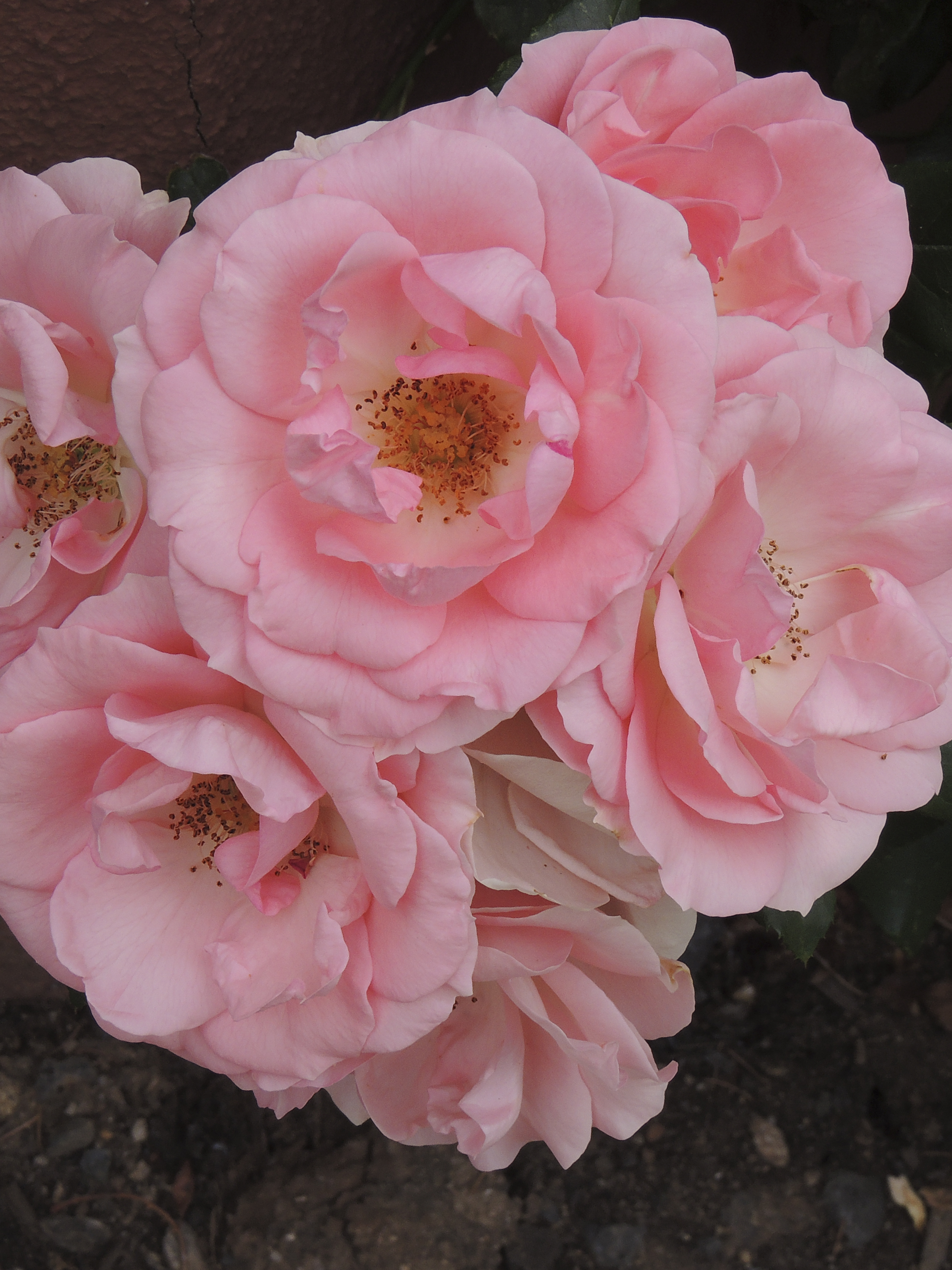
'Rose Professor Sieber' Kordes 1997. Floribunda. Pale pink changing to mid-pink then white. Massed around the base of the bandstand.

== See also ==
- Australia's Open Garden Scheme
- Gardening in Australia
