= Garnett (surname) =

Garnett is a surname. Notable people with the surname include:

- A.Y.P. Garnett (1820–1888), American physician
- Alvester Garnett (born 1970), American jazz drummer
- Amaryllis Garnett (1943–1973), English actress
- Amy Garnett (born 1976), English rugby union player
- Angelica Garnett (1918–2012), English writer and painter
- Arthur William Garnett (1829–1861), English military and civil engineer
- Bill Garnett (born 1960), American basketball player
- Blind Leroy Garnett (1897–1933), American boogie-woogie and ragtime pianist and songwriter
- Bret Garnett (born 1967), American tennis player
- Carlos Garnett (1938–2023), Panamanian-American jazz saxophonist
- Christopher Garnett, British railway executive
- Connor Garnett, American professional pickleball player
- Constance Garnett (1861–1946), English translator
- Dave Garnett (born 1970), American football player
- David Garnett (1892–1981), British writer and publisher
- David S. Garnett (born 1947), British science fiction writer
- Edward Garnett (1868–1937), British writer, critic and editor
- Edward Garnett (cricketer) (born 1965), English cricketer
- Eve Garnett (1900–1991), English author and illustrator
- Gale Garnett (born 1942), New Zealand-born Canadian folk singer
- Gwynn Garnett (1909-1995), Director of the U.S. Foreign Agricultural Service
- Harold Garnett (1879–1917), English-born cricketer who played for Lancashire and Argentina
- Harry Garnett (1851–1928), British rugby player
- Henrietta Garnett (1945–2019), English writer
- Henry Garnet or Garnett (1555–1606), English Jesuit priest, executed for complicity in the Gunpowder Plot
- Sir Ian Garnett (born 1944), Royal Navy admiral
- James M. Garnett (1770–1843), American politician from Virginia
- Jeremiah Garnett (1793–1870), English journalist
- John Garnett (bishop) (1707/8–1782), English priest, bishop of Clogher, Ireland
- John B. Garnett (born 1940), American mathematician
- Joy Garnett (born 1965), American artist
- Kevin Garnett (born 1976), American basketball player
- Lucy Garnett (1849–1934), British folklorist and traveller
- Marlon Garnett (born 1975), Belizean basketball player
- Maxwell Garnett (1880–1958), English educationist, barrister, and peace campaigner
- Merrill Garnett (born 1931), American biochemist and cancer researcher
- Michael Garnett (born 1982), Canadian ice hockey player
- Muscoe Russell Hunter Garnett (1821–1864), American politician from Virginia
- Nick Garnett (born 1964), English journalist and broadcaster
- Nicole Stelle Garnett (born 1970), American law professor
- Richard Garnett (philologist) (1789–1850), English philologist, author and librarian at the British Museum
- Richard Garnett (writer) (1835–1906), English scholar, librarian, biographer and poet
- Richard B. Garnett (1817–1863), Confederate general in American Civil War
- Richard W. Garnett (born 1968), American legal scholar
- Robert S. Garnett (congressman) (1789–1840), American politician and lawyer
- Robert S. Garnett (1819–1861), Confederate officer in American Civil War
- Ruby Nash Garnett (born 1939), American singer
- Sarah Garnett, New Zealand hockey umpire
- Shaun Garnett (born 1969), English football player
- Tay Garnett (1894–1977), American film director
- Thomas Garnet or Garnett (1575–1608), English Jesuit priest and martyr, declared a saint in 1970
- Thomas Garnett (disambiguation), multiple people
- Tommy Garnett (1915–2006), Australian headmaster, ornithologist and horticulturist
- Tony Garnett (1936–2020), British film producer
- William Garnett (civil servant) (1793–1873), British inspector-general of stamps and taxes who took a leading part in the introduction of income tax in Britain
- William Garnett (politician) (1818–1873), British politician
- William Garnett (photographer) (1916–2006), American photographer
- Winfield Garnett (born 1976), American football player

Fictional characters:

- Alf Garnett, character in 20th century BBC television sitcoms

== See also ==
- Garnet (name)
