= Alister Clark =

Australian rose breeder

Alister Clark (1864–1949) was the best known and most influential Australian rose breeder. His roses were the most widely planted in Australia between the World Wars and made an enduring difference to the appearance of Australian cities. His experiments hybridising Rosa gigantea were in world class and have never been surpassed.

== Biography ==
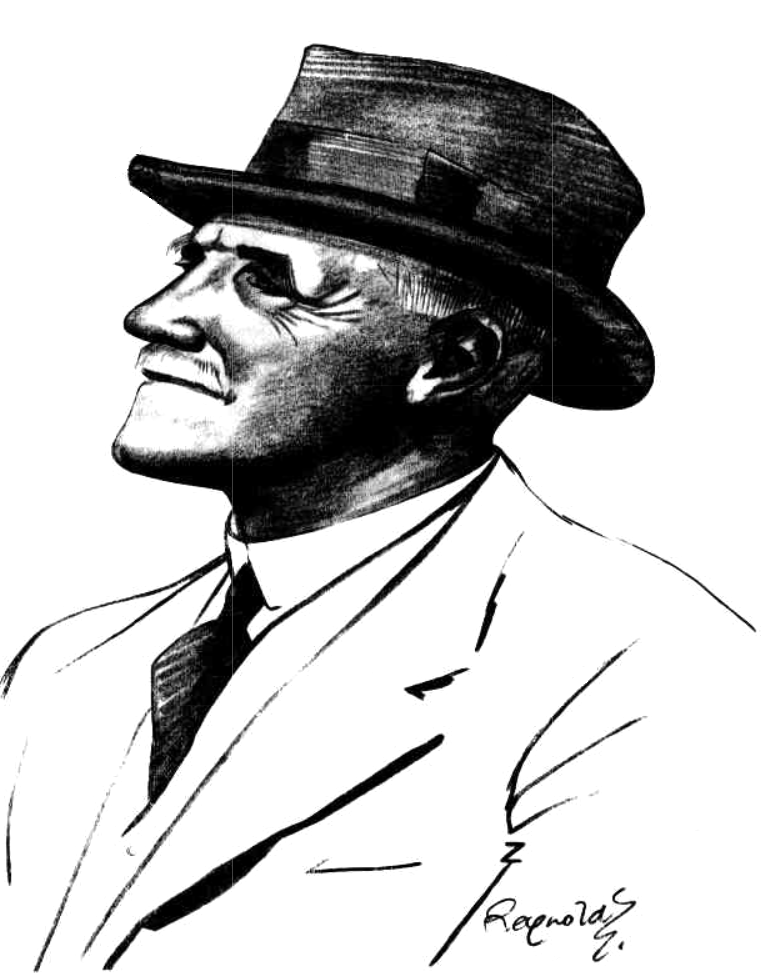
1930 portrait by Reynolds

Alister Clark was the son of an immigrant Scottish tenant farmer who did well in Australia, leaving his family with several outback cattle stations, as well as "Glenara", a big property in a valley at Bulla, north of Melbourne. Clarke and his siblings received a genteel upbringing and knew Europe well: Clark was educated at Loretto School in Scotland and at Jesus College, Cambridge. He married Edith Mary a New Zealander with a considerable fortune and never worked, giving himself over to the business of being a gentleman: huntsman, polo player, racehorse owner, golfer, photographer — and rose breeder. He began his rose breeding by ordering roses from Paul & Son in England; later they came from the Nabonnand nursery at Golfe-Juan on the French Riviera. Between 1912 and his death, Clark released about 150 roses, usually through the garden and sporting clubs to which he gave the royalties.

== Daffodils ==
Clark was also a keen breeder of daffodils. In 1897 Clark had joined a syndicate, including Thomas Hanbury (creator of the famous Riviera garden of La Mortola) and Ellen Willmott (of Warley Place), which bought the stock of daffodil bulbs bred by Rev. G. H. Engleheart. He also bought half the stock of a bulb collection made by English Shakespearean actor, George Titheradge. According to Tommy Garnett, the best known of Clark's daffodils is probably 'Mabel Taylor', still in commerce and used for breeding.

== Roses ==
Clark's main aim as a breeder was to produce roses that were hardy in the hot dry climate of southern Australia. To this end he made original use of crosses to Rosa gigantea, which produced in the second generation some of the toughest and most freely blooming roses ever bred: 'Lorraine Lee' of 1924 and 'Nancy Hayward' of 1937 have never lost public favour. 'Black Boy' of 1919, 'Lady Huntingfield' of 1937 (named after the State Governor's wife) and 'Squatter's Dream' of 1923 (named after a racehorse) are roses which have been unknown or underrated outside Australia.

Soon after the First World War, Clark's experiments with Rosa gigantea slowed down. He turned to creating what are essentially hybrid teas in a wide variety of forms: low shrubs ('Mab Grimwade'), high bushes ('Editor Stewart'), rampant climbers ('Mrs Richard Turnbull'), pillar roses ('Princeps'), roses for hedges ('Sunny South'), ramblers ('Gladsome') and dwarves ('Borderer'). He seems to have had no breeding plan beyond making as many crosses as possible at "Glenara" and seeing what came up. His grounds became "a vast nursery for the propagation of roses and daffodils." Roses should be tested in the climate they were meant for, he said. And he insisted that a seedling (like a yearling) takes three years to show what it can do.

Perhaps it is surprising for a man who wore a bowler hat and wing collar to the races in 1920, but his roses have the bright pinks, creamy apricots and hard reds of between-the-wars taste. It was the great age of the single or near-single rose; he bred 'Nancy Hayward,' 'Cicely Lascelles' and 'Squatter's Dream.' It is difficult to tell how his taste adjusted to the 1940s since 30 of the 40 roses he produced then have been lost, casualties of war. In any case, his roses of all periods have an irregularity which rose fanciers find endearing.

Twenty years after his death in 1949 Alister Clark remained the most important Australian rose breeder. A. S. Thomas was the Australian registrar of roses and president of the National Rose Society of Victoria. The 1967 edition of his Better Roses prints a list of eighty "highly prized cultivars" from Australia and New Zealand. Twenty of them are roses by Alister Clark. Seven are by Frank Riethmuller. No other breeder rates more than two.

'Lorraine Lee,' 'Nancy Hayward' and 'Black Boy' have never left the nursery catalogues. Other Clark roses went out of fashion after his death. Still others were lost or never released. But many have been revived since the 1990s by such enthusiasts as the writer Susan Irvine and the nurseryman John Nieuwesteeg. A heading in Charles Quest-Ritson's authoritative Climbing Roses of the World says simply "Alister Clark: The Great Australian Rose Breeder."

== Rose names and dedications ==
Most of Clark's roses are named after and for women he knew, more often than not from landed families ('Cicely Lascelles,' 'Kitty Kininmonth'). Most women in his own family and all wives of Victorian Governors and Australian Governors-General had roses named for them. Lady Gowrie already had one, so hers had to be called 'Zara Hore-Ruthven.' Very few men received roses, all of them rose people in one way or another. Far more are devoted to racehorses: 'Squatter's Dream,' 'Tonner's Fancy,' 'Flying Colours' and so on. Trailing the field are descriptive titles: 'Sunny South,' 'Borderer' and 'Daydream.' 'Scorcher' and 'Billy Boiler' were slang for a hot day.

== Where Alister Clark roses can be seen ==
Alister Clark made a lasting difference to the appearance of Australia. Thousands of plants of 'Lorraine Lee' in particular, bred ninety years ago, can be seen in every temperate town and city.

- Sixty-seven of his available roses are collected at the Alister Clark Memorial Rose Garden in Bulla, the township next to "Glenara." This collection should not be confused with that of the same name in the Botanic Gardens in St Kilda, a Melbourne suburb, which has about five Clark varieties, unlabelled.
- The National Rose Collection created by David Ruston at Renmark, South Australia has nearly all known Clark climbers.
- The Morwell Centenary Rose Garden in Morwell, Victoria lists 38, including the often-confused 'Black Boy' and 'Countess of Stradbroke.'
- In Canberra the centre of the Rex Hazlewood Rose Garden at Old Parliament House has 26 Alister Clark roses, including such relative rarities as 'Mrs Albert Nash.'
- The Victoria State Rose Garden at Werribee Park has a large collection, especially of his gigantea climbers.
- The Geelong Botanic Gardens have 'Borderer,' 'Lady Huntingfield,' Mrs Maud Alston,' 'Mrs Fred Danks' and 'Squatter's Dream.'
- The Adelaide Botanical Garden has some, including 'Amy Johnson.'
- The Kodja Place Roze Maze at Kojonup, Western Australia uses hedges of Australian roses, including 32 by Alister Clark.

Public gardens in suitable climates beyond Australia contain a tiny number of his roses. The Monserrate Palace garden at Sintra outside Lisbon has three. Sangerhausen in northern Germany has a small selection of Clark roses including two which would otherwise be extinct. Many of his roses were popular in the United States between the wars and, after a long lapse, interest has revived. So far this is only partly shown in public collections. The Descanso Gardens in La Cañada Flintridge, California have had 55 and are said to be restoring their collection. Roses Unlimited of Laurens, South Carolina has 18 Clark roses on its list. 'Borderer' is said to be the Clark rose most popular with American gardeners. Few European collectors of hybrid gigantea crosses have Clark examples in private gardens.

== Gallery ==
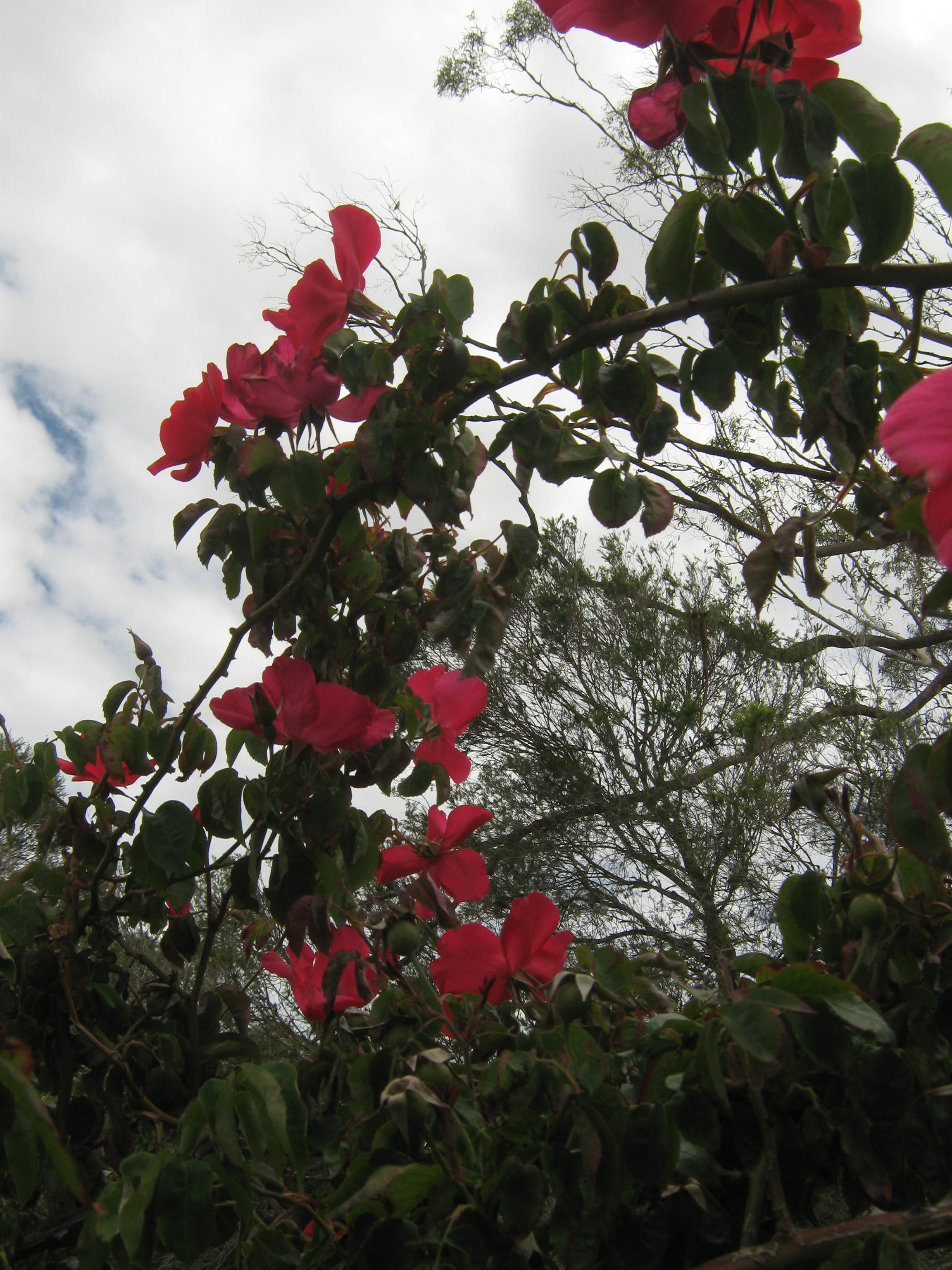
'Nancy Hayward.' Big single flowers on a six-metre climber. Werribee Park.

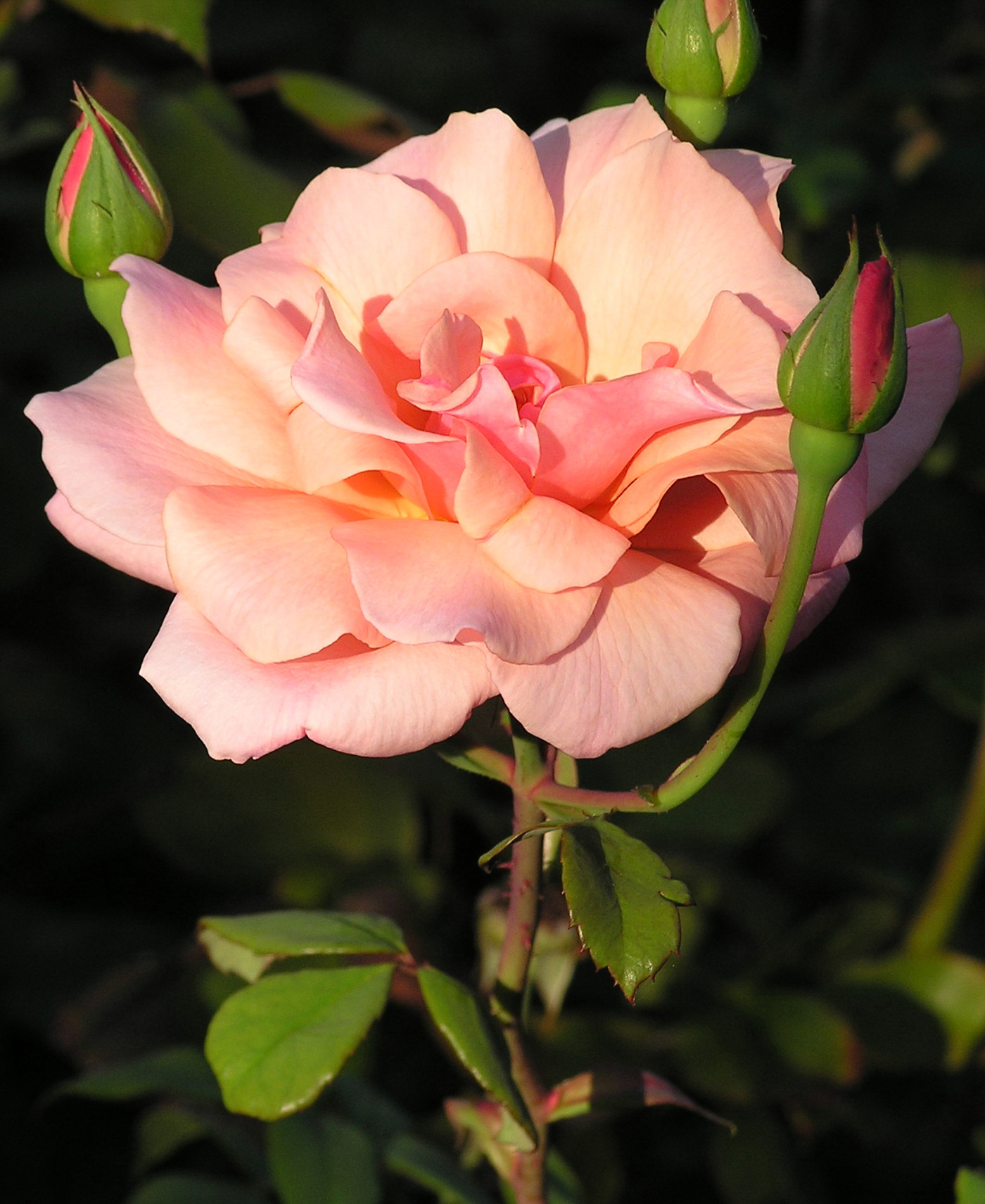
'Sunlit' 1937. Intensely scented medium-size flowers on a low bush, flowering all year in a hot climate. Margaret Furness photo.

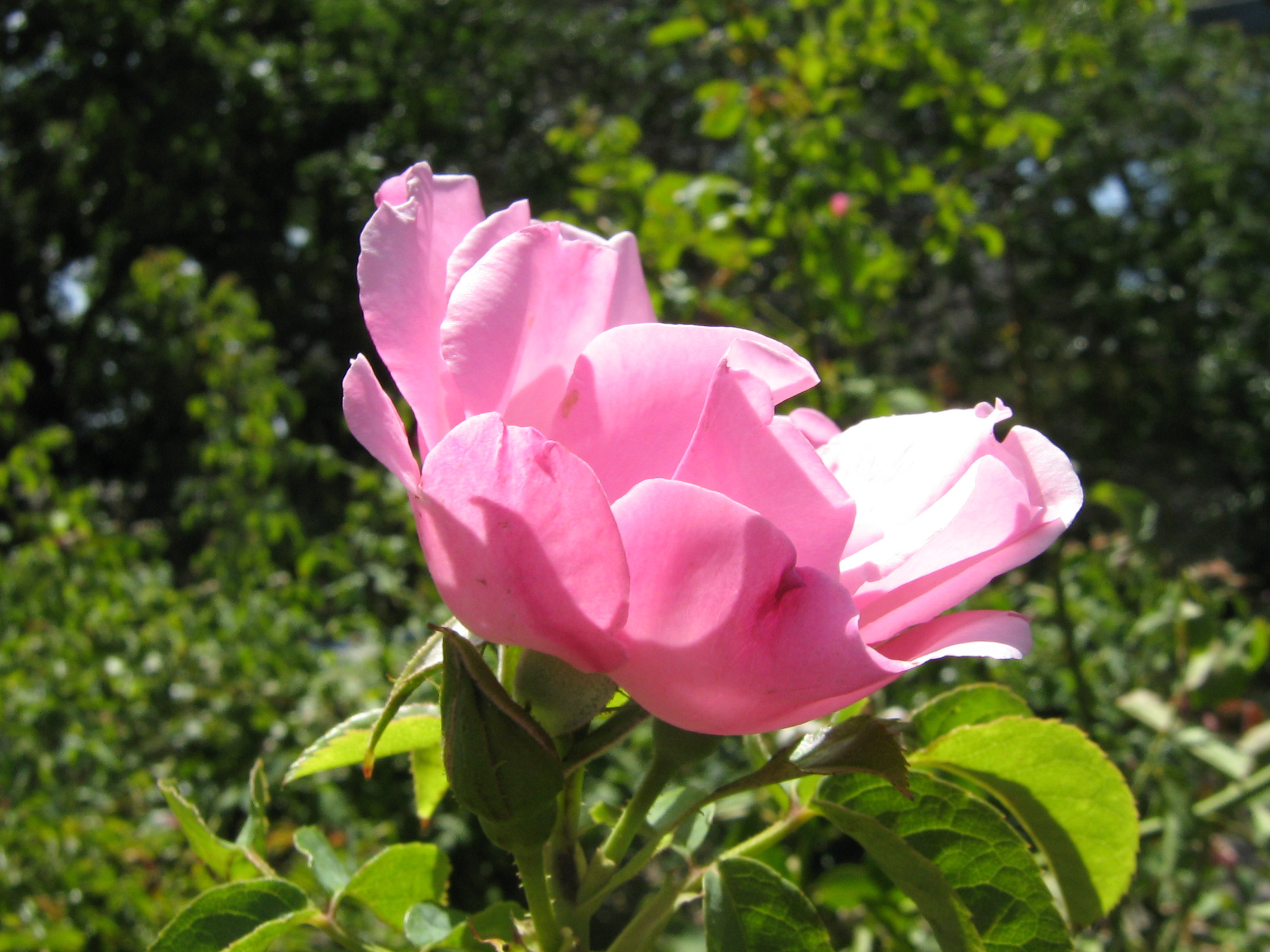
'Cicely O'Rorke' 1926, released 1937. Big, lightly scented flowers on a tall climber.

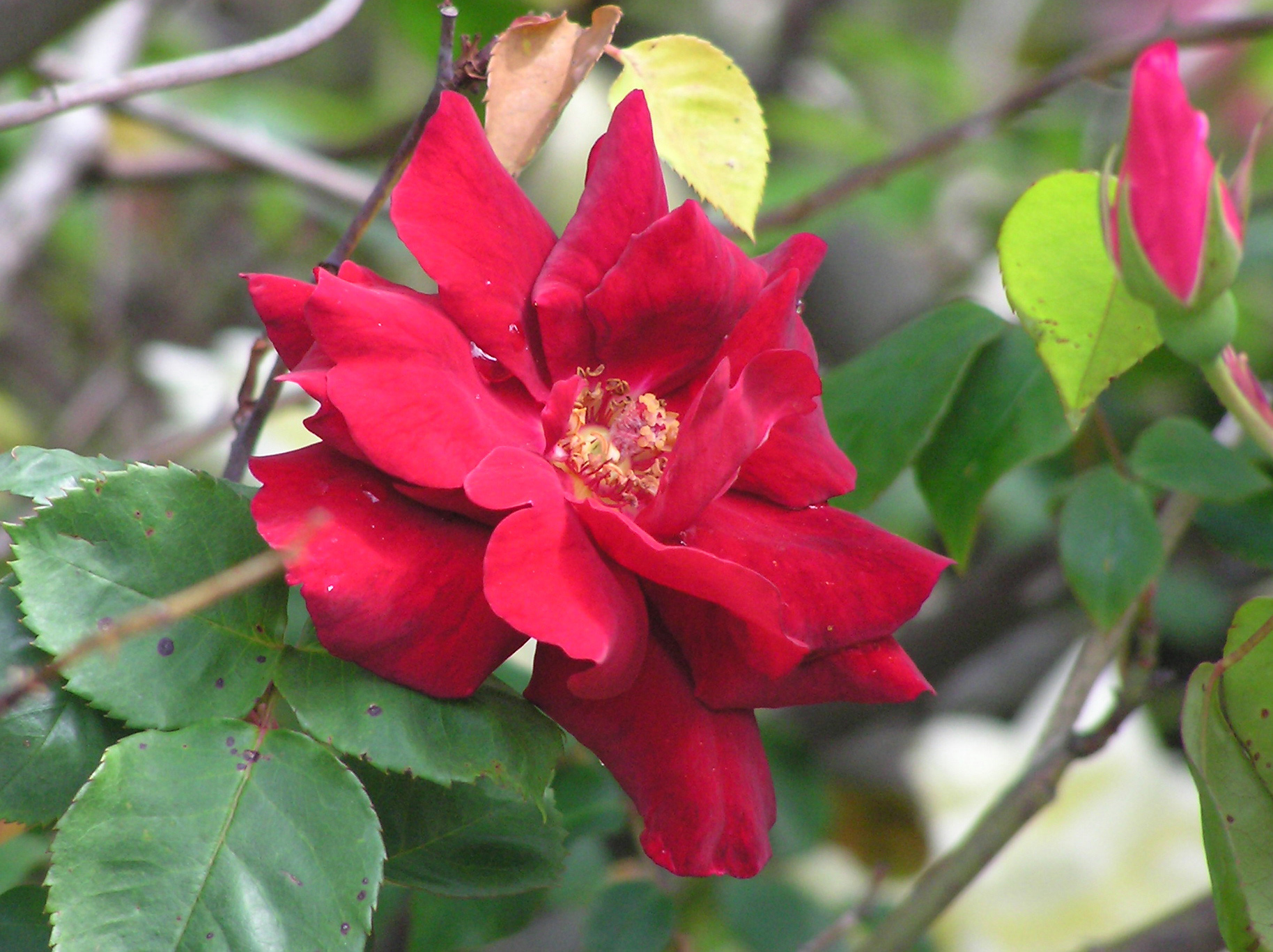
'Billy Boiler' 1927, lost for many years. A strongly scented 3-metre climber. Werribee Park

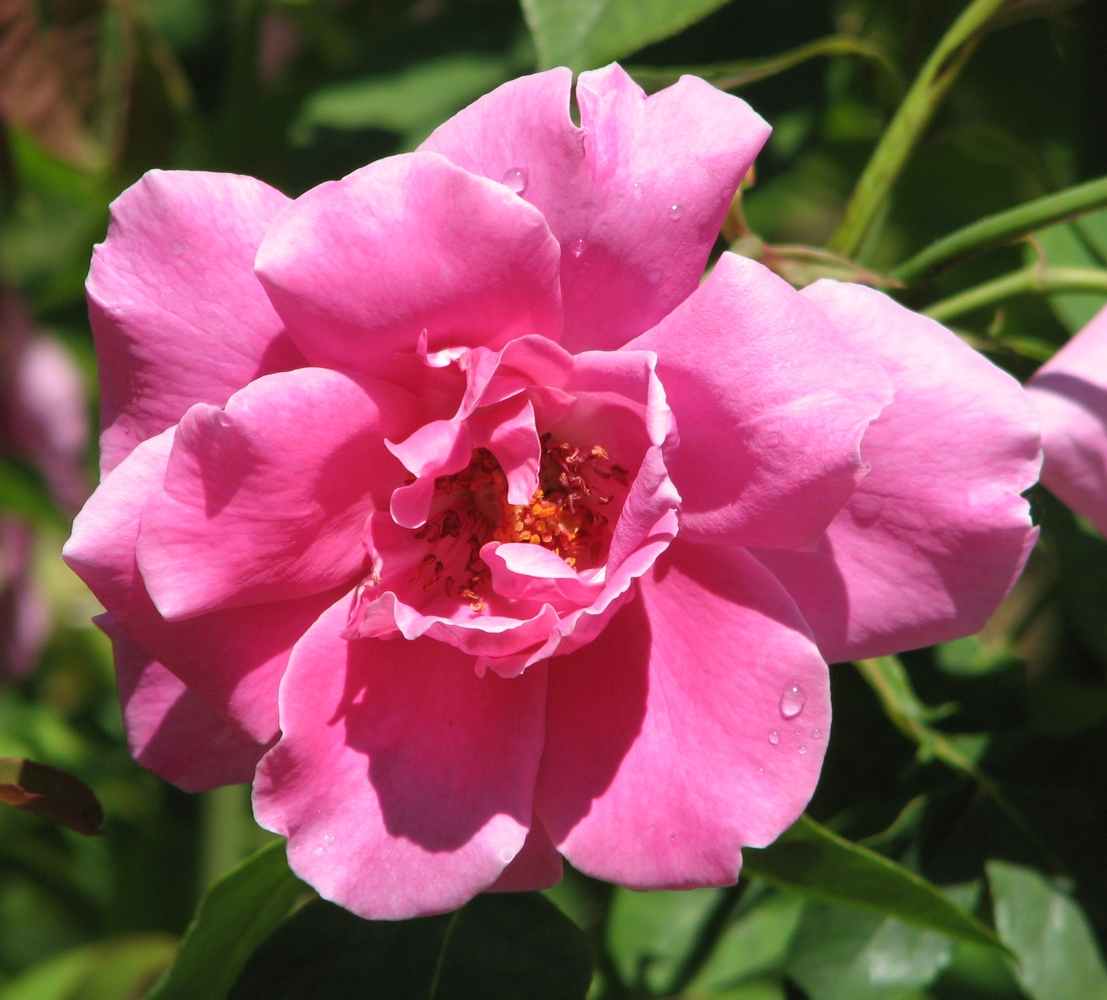
'Mrs Fred Danks' 1951. Well scented 9-cm mauve–lilac–violet flowers on a two-metre bush; very recurrent. Geelong Botanic Gardens.

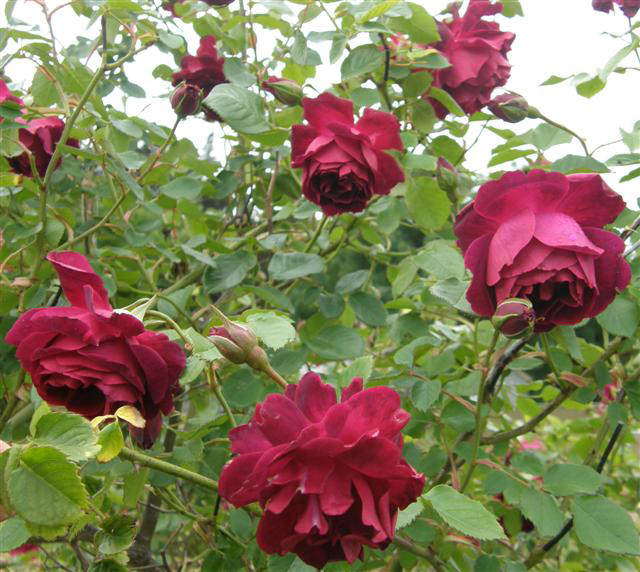
'Black Boy ' in early spring. Richly scented, climbing to four metres. Margaret Furness photo.

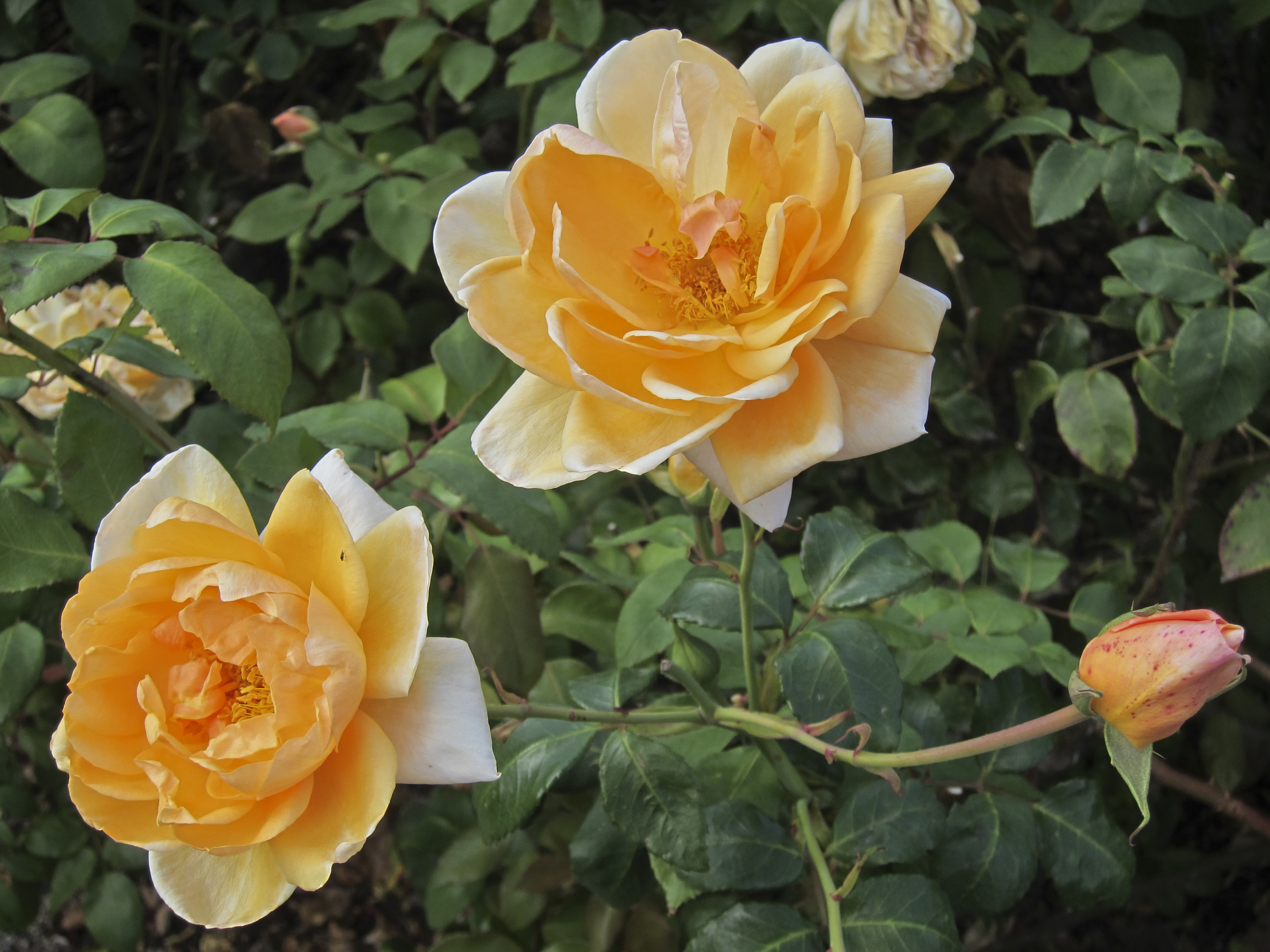
'Lady Huntingfield.' Scented 10-cm flowers, very recurrent on a low bush. Werribee Park photo.

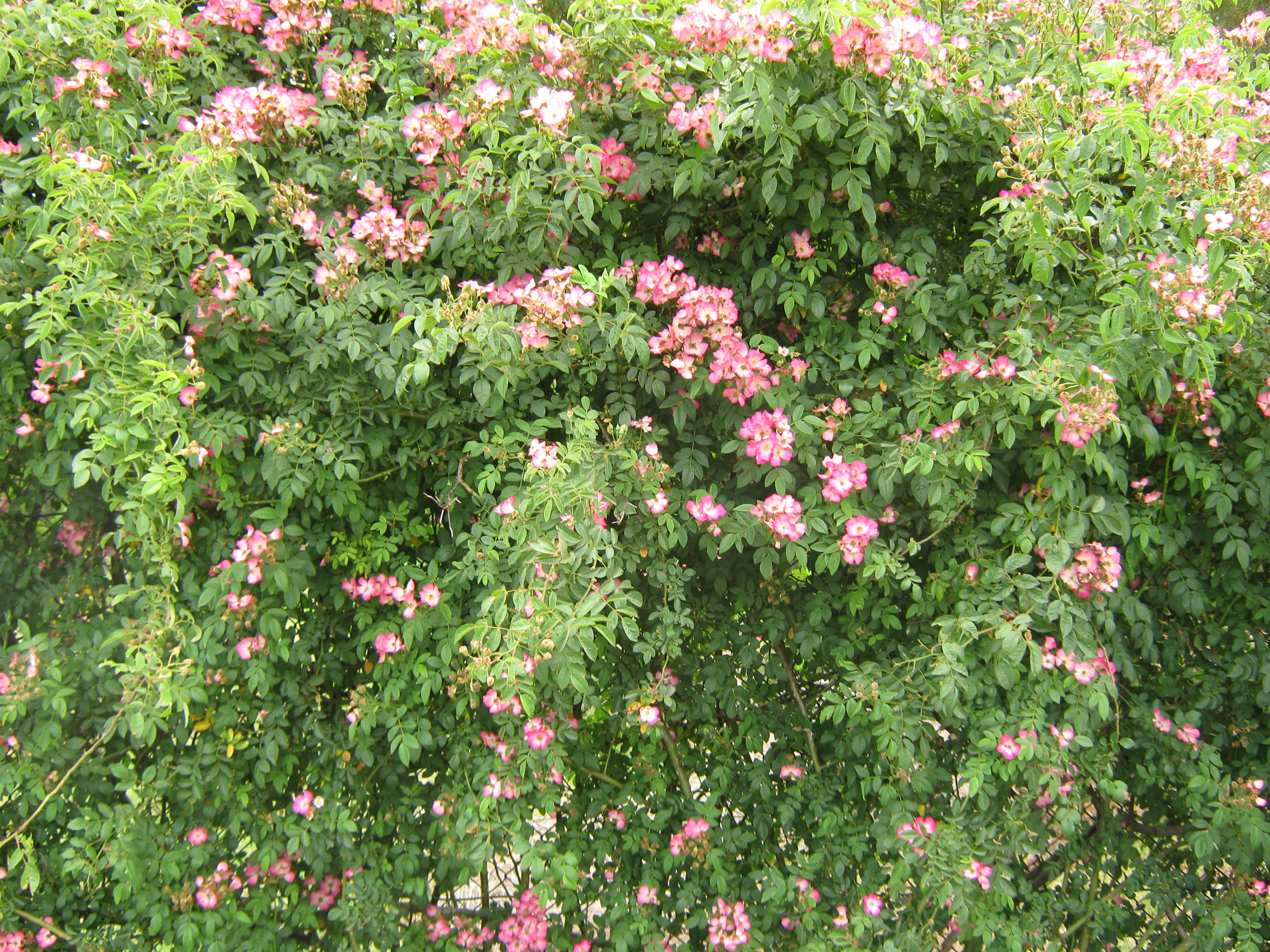
The 1937 rambler 'Gladsome' at Werribee Park.

== See also ==
- List of Alister Clark roses
- Alister Clark Memorial Rose Garden
- Alister Clark Stakes
