= List of Alister Clark roses =

This is a list of the known roses of the Australian breeder Alister Clark (1864–1949). It is an attachment to the main page on Alister Clark as a rose breeder. The list of surviving roses has been compiled from Peter Cox's Australian Roses; the online list established by Help Me Find Roses for Clark, Alister; and from the Govanstones' The Women Behind the Roses. Lost roses have been compiled from a press release PDF of the Rose Society of New South Wales when reconciled to the online list established by Help Me Find Roses for Clark, Alister. 'Baxter Beauty' is the sport of an Alister Clark rose, not an Alister Clark rose itself.

In the Extant column of the table, "Yes" means extant in Australia, "Doubtful" means there exists a rose of doubtful authenticity, "Italy" &c means extant only in Italy &c, "Lost" means lost to cultivation.

Name	Date	Type	Colour	Extant	Photo
Agnes Barclay	1927	HT	Yellow blend, salmon tints	Doubtful	
Amy Johnson	1931	HT	Pink	Yes	
Argosy	1938	HT	Pink blend	Doubtful	
Australia Felix	1919	HT	Pink	Yes	
Baxter Beauty	by 1927	Hybrid Gigantea	Yellow	Yes	
Billy Boiler	1927	HT	Red	Yes	
Black Boy	1919	Large flowered climber	Crimson	Yes	
Borderer	1918	Polyantha	Salmon-pink	Yes	
Busybody	1929	HT	Chrome yellow	Yes	
Cherub	1923	Rambler	Salmon-pink	Yes	
Cicely Lascelles	1937	Climber	Pink shaded salmon	Yes	
Cicely O’Rorke	1937	Climber	Deep pink	Yes	
Countess of Stradbroke	1928	Climber	Dark red	Yes	
Courier	1930	Hybrid gigantea	White and pink	Yes	
Cracker	1920	HT	Red blend	Germany	
Daydream	1925	Climber	Light pink	Yes	
Diana Allen	1939	HT	Salmon-pink	Yes	
Dividend	1931	HT	Golden-yellow	Yes	
Doris Downes	1932	Hybrid gigantea	Pink blend	Yes	
Edith Clark	1927	HT	Red	USA	
Editor Stewart	1939	HT	Red	Yes	
Emily Rhodes	1937	Climber	Pink	Yes	
Fairlie Rede	1937	HT	Orange-pink	Yes	
Flying Colours	1922	Hybrid gigantea	Deep pink	Yes	
Gladsome	1937	Hybrid multiflora	Pink with white centre	Yes	
Glenara	1951	HT	Deep pink	Yes	
Golden Vision	1922	Hybrid gigantea	Yellow	Yes	
Gwen Nash	1920	Hybrid gigantea	Cyclamen pink	Yes	
Harbinger	1923	Hybrid gigantea	Light pink	Yes	
Herbert Brunning	1940	HT	Brilliant red	Yes	
Janet Morrison	1936	HT	Deep pink	Yes	
Jessie Clark	1915	Hybrid gigantea	Light pink	Yes	
Kitty Kininmonth	1922	Hybrid gigantea	Carmine-pink	Yes	
Lady Huntingfield	1937	HT	Golden yellow	Yes	
Lady Mann	1940	HT	Pink blend	Yes	
Lady Medallist	1912	HT	Pink	Yes	
Lady Somers	1930	Hybrid gigantea	Light pink	Yes	
Lorraine Lee	1924	Hybrid gigantea	Pink blend	Yes	
Lynda Hurst	1938	HT	Pink	Italy	
Mab Grimwade	1927	HT	Yellow blend	Yes	
Madge Taylor	1930	HT	Carmine	Yes	
Margaret Turnbull	1931	Climber	Salmon pink	Yes	
Marjory Palmer	1936	Polyantha	Pink	Yes	
Mary Guthrie	1929	Polyantha	Pink	Yes	
Mary Warren	1930	Hybrid gigantea	Pink	Unknown	
Milkmaid	1925	Noisette	White	Yes	
Miss Madden's climber	by 2007	Climber	Pink	Yes	
Mrs Albert Nash	1929	HT	Dark red	Yes	
Mrs Alston's rose	1940	Polyantha	Deep pink	Yes	
Mrs Douglas Copeland	1945	HT	Pink	USA	
Mrs Frank Guthrie	1923	HT	Clear pink	Doubtful	
Mrs Fred Danks	1951	HT	Mauve	Yes	
Mrs Harold Alston	1940	Climber	Pink	Yes	
Mrs Harold Brookes	1931	HT	Red	Yes	
Mrs Hugh Dettman	1930	Hybrid gigantea	Apricot turning salmon pink	Yes	
Mrs Murray's seedling	1948	HT	Soft pink	Yes	
Mrs Norman Watson	by 1930	Climber	Deep pink	Yes	
Mrs Oswin's gigantea	1933	Hybrid gigantea	Apricot and pink	Yes	
Mrs RC Bell	1920	HT	Crimson scarlet	Doubtful	
Mrs Richard Turnbull	1945	Hybrid gigantea	White blend	Yes	
Mrs WR Groves	1941	HT	Dark red	Doubtful	
Nancy Hayward	1937	Hybrid gigantea	Red	Yes	
Nancy Wilson	1940	HT	Silvery pink	Yes	
Nora Cunningham	1920	Hybrid gigantea	Light pink	Yes	
Peggy Bell	1928	HT	Carmine pink	Doubtful	
Pennant	1941	Hybrid gigantea	Pink	Yes	
Princeps	1942	Hybrid gigantea	Red	Yes	
Queen of Hearts	1919	Climber	Pink	Yes	
Refresher	1929	Climber	White	Germany	
Restless	1938	HT	Dark red	Yes	
Ringlet	1922	Climber	Pink blend with white centre	Yes	
Rosy Morn	1914	Climber	Clear pink	USA	
Ruby King	1915	Wichurana rambler	Carmine red with white centre	Germany	
Scorcher	1922	Hybrid gigantea	Dark red	Yes	
Sheila Bellair	1937	HT	Salmon-pink	Yes	
Squatter's Dream	1923	Hybrid gigantea shrub	Golden yellow fading	Yes	
Suitor	1940	Polyantha	Light pink	Yes	
Sunday Best	1924	Hybrid perpetual	Cherry red	USA	
Sunlit	1937	HT	Apricot	Yes	
Sunny South	1918	HT	Pink blend	Yes	
Tonner's Fancy	1928	Hybrid gigantea	White blend	Yes	
Traverser	1928	Hybrid gigantea	Deep cream	Yes	
Zara Hore-Ruthven	1932	HT	Pink	Yes	
AG Furness	1941	HT	Red	Lost	
Agnes Prior				Lost	
AW Jessep	1945	HT	Cerise pink	Lost	
Beatrice McGregor	1938	HT	Dark red	Lost	
Bonnie Doun	1941	Climber	Light pink	Lost	
Bonnie Rosette	1940	Hybrid moyesii	Red	Lost	
Bright Boy	1941	HT	Light pink	Lost	
Bushfire	1917	Rambler	Red	Lost	
Cécile Mann	1939	HT	Deep red	Lost	
Don José	1922	HT	Salmon pink	Lost	
Doris Osborne	1937	HT	Pink-carmine	Lost	
Dorothy Mollison	1930	HT	Dark red	Lost	
Dr AS Thomas	1945	HT	Crimson	Lost	
Ella Guthrie	1937	HT	Pink	Lost	
Fancy Free	1922	HT	Pink blend	Lost	
Fanny Bullivant	1941	HT	Light pink	Lost	
Fire Dragon				Lost	
Geelong	1938<	Hybrid gigantea		Lost	
Glaive	1951	HT	Cream, pink tipped	Lost	
Golden Drop	1939	HT	Deep yellow	Lost	
Gwendoline Collins	1937	HT	Cherry red	Lost	
Hilarious	1935			Lost	
James Allan	1936			Lost	
Jean Renton	1940	HT	Deep yellow	Lost	
John Cronin	1935	HT	Deep pink	Lost	
JR Byfield	1941	HT	Red	Lost	
Joyce Fairey	1929	Climber	Red	Lost	
Judith Black	1930	HT	Dark red	Lost	
Keepsake	1941	HT	Deep red	Lost	
Lady Fraser	1941	HT	Deep cherry red	Lost	
Lady Fairbairn	1929	HT	Deep pink	Lost	
Lady Miller	1940	HT	Dark red	Lost	
Lady Rhodes	1933	HT	Crimson carmine	Lost	
Loretto	1922	Wichuriana	Crimson	Lost	
Lorna Anderson	1940	HT	Magenta	Lost	
Mabel Stewart	1942	Climber	Crimson	Lost	
Mary Bostock	1952	HT	Light pink	Lost	
Marie Green	1941	HT	Red	Lost	
Mary Russell	1940	HT	Red	Lost	
Maude Nash	1942	HT	Red	Lost	
Mavis Campbell	1942	HT	Deep pink	Lost	
Mrs Alister Clark	1915	Tea	Creamy yellow	Lost	
Mrs EM Gibson	1940	HT	Dark red	Lost	
Mrs Roy Green	1940	HT	Dark red	Lost	
Mrs Frank Guthrie	1923	HT	Pink	Lost	
Mrs Phillip Russell	1927	HT	Dark red	Lost	
Obvious	1937 or earlier	Climber	Unknown	Lost	
Passport	1940	Climber	Dark red	Lost	
Pick Me Up	1941	HT	Red	Lost	
Powder Puff	1938<	HT	White	Lost	
Red Hill	1941	HT	Red	Lost	
Remembrance	by 1948	HT	Deep red	Lost	
Roseate	1931	Climber	Red	Lost	
Royal Visitor	1928			Lost	
Sentinel	1934	HT	Cerise	Lost	
Sir Arthur Streeton	1940	HT	Soft pink	Lost	
Sophie Mackinnon	1937	HT	Dark red	Lost	
Southern Cross	1931	HT	Pink	Lost	
Stately	1930	HT	Light pink	Lost	
Steadfast	1939	HT	Pink and fawn	Lost	
Sweet Seventeen	1923	HT	Light pink	Lost	
The Indian	1939	HT	Very dark red	Lost	
The Rajah	1937	HT	Red	Lost	
Valerie Purves	1940	HT	Deep pink	Lost	
Vigilant	1941	HT	Dark red	Lost	
War Paint	1930	Climber	Red and pink	Lost	
WH Dunallan	1939	HT	Red	Lost	
