= Riethmuller =

Riethmuller (and Riethmüller) is a surname. Notable people with the surname include:

- Albrecht Riethmüller (born 1947), German musicologist
- Frank Riethmuller (1884–1965), Australian rose breeder
- Joel Riethmuller (born 1985), Italian rugby league player
- Otto Riethmüller (1889–1938), German Lutheran minister, writer and hymnwriter
