= Garlett =

Garlett is a surname. Notable people with the surname include:

- Cruize Garlett (born 1989), Australian rules footballer
- Jarrod Garlett (born 1996), Australian rules footballer, second cousin of Jeff
- Jeff Garlett (born 1989), Australian rules footballer

== See also ==
- Garnett (surname)
