= Susan Irvine =

Australian educator, author, and rose authority (1928–2019)

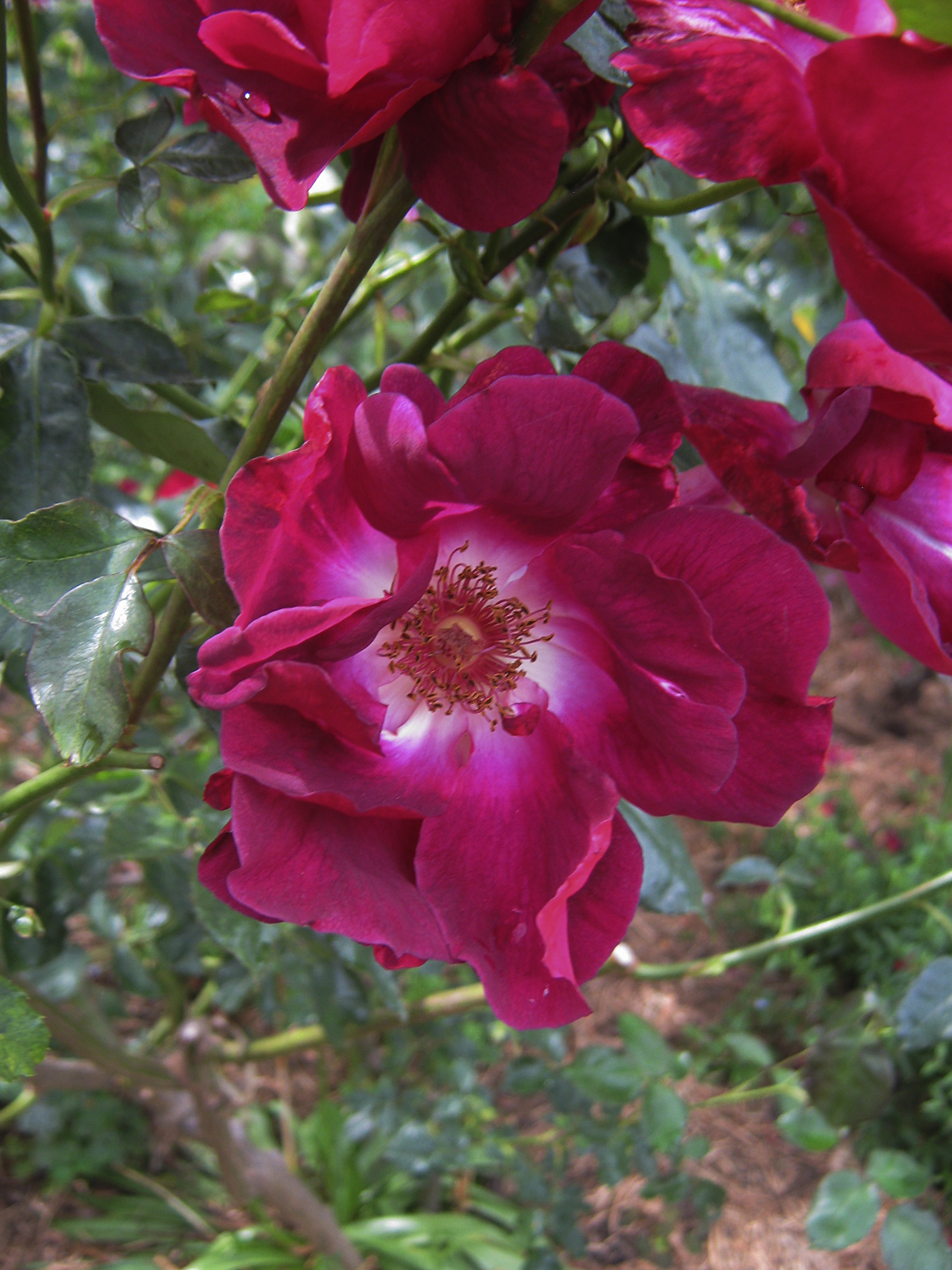
" 'Restless'. Tall bush. Hybrid Tea … Very dark velvety red with magnificent scent. Very recurrent."—Susan Irvine, A Hillside of Roses, p. 121.

Susan Irvine (1928–2019) was an Australian educator, author and rose authority.

== Family and education ==
Susan Irvine (pronounced Ervin) was born in Dalby, Queensland in 1928. She was the second of three daughters of John Moore and Niree Hunter (b. 1897, m. 1923). Her self-supporting mother ran a full-time and wide-ranging business called Arts and Antiques. At the same time her mother was socially and geographically prominent, her house Lynfield overlooking Toowoomba from The Range. Irvine, like her sisters, boarded at The Glennie School – down the street from Lynfield – from the age of four till the age of 17 and "absolutely hated" it.

Straight after the Second World War, Irvine began a music degree in voice and cello at the University of Melbourne, married at 19 a Sydney radiologist ten years older, Peter Tod, and moved to Sydney. To further her husband's training they moved to London (1949–1951), where she had a daughter (b. 1950). Peter and Irvine returned to Brisbane where a second daughter was born (b.1951). Irvine started a B.A. in medieval German mysticism, German poetry and philosophy at Brisbane university. The family travelled to Germany in 1955 where Irvine continued her studies at Heidelberg University but returned to Australia in 1956 without completing a PhD at the University of Heidelberg in Germany due to the serious ill health of one of her daughters. Fluent in German, Irvine commenced her teaching career at PLC Orange. A third daughter was born in Brisbane in 1958.

== Career ==
Mostly as Susan St Leon, Susan taught at the following private schools:

- 1956, Presbyterian Ladies' College, Orange, New South Wales.
- 1965–72, Abbotsleigh, Sydney, New South Wales under Betty Archdale as headmistress, Susan managing administration and teaching German
- 1973–83, Lauriston Girls' School, Melbourne, as headmistress.

Irvine was the first headmistress of Lauriston appointed by the School Council, implying Lauriston was now a public institution more than a private school. "Elegant, charismatic and vivacious", she presided over Lauriston's response to the enormous professional and material expansion of private education in the Whitlam era. Though overt expression of authority was reduced, she strongly favoured doing "one or two things very well [rather than] eight or nine things badly". Things worth achieving undoubtedly included high standards in mathematics, science and languages. These were soon reflected in public exam results. Music, art and drama were also favoured.

In 1985, Irvine married W. R. M. (Bill) Irvine OAM, who had been chairman of the Lauriston School Council 1977–81. Originally a solicitor at Hedderwick, Fookes and Alston, Bill was chairman of the National Australia Bank 1979–97 and its associated companies in the UK and New Zealand. He was also chairman of Phillip Morris Australia and a director of Burns Philp and Caltex Australia. Bill Irvine makes an early appearance in Susan's Garden of a Thousand Roses as a lawyer friend and visitor to Bleak House who reveals a light touch adjusting Shire planning decisions.

== Roses ==
In 1982, Irvine retired to establish a garden and what became a well-known rose nursery on 15 acres (6.1 ha) at Bleak House, Malmsbury and, with Bill Irvine in 1992, the garden of Erinvale on 1.5 acres (0.61 ha) in Gisborne, Central Victoria. At Gisborne she held the Alister Clark Rose Collection and the Australian Rose Collection for Ornamental Plants.

In the late 1980s and early 1990s, Irvine used her social and garden connections to find, save, identify and revive scores of roses by the best-known Australian breeder, Alister Clark. Clark's rose 'Nancy Hayward' for instance was identified by Nancy Hayward herself. Little known roses like 'Restless' were carefully evaluated as garden plants. Her companion in many of these explorations was the Coldstream nurseryman John Nieuwesteeg. They surveyed possible Clark material in gardens at Berwick, Kyneton and at Glenara, Clark's house at Bulla. Riethmuller's 'Carabella' was another rose rescued from obscurity.

From this period date her most influential books, describing her discoveries. A Garden of a Thousand Roses started with "a century-old stone cottage called Bleak House on the windswept plains of Central Victoria and transformed it into a mecca for thousands of rose lovers". A Hillside of Roses about the design and construction of Erinvale was greeted as "a rose book that reads like a novel." She had become "a leading authority on roses".

By 1992, Irvine had named after her mother 'Niree Hunter', a Rugosa rose she had discovered at Bleak House. In 1994 she received the Australian Rose Award from the National Rose Society of Australia. A Hybrid Gigantea rose called 'Susan Irvine' was introduced in South Australia in 1996. She became a Life Member of Heritage Roses in Australia in 2001.

In 1996, she and her husband moved to Forest Hall at Elizabeth Town in Northern Tasmania where she again established a large garden. It contains many Alister Clark roses. (All her gardens are attached to nineteenth century houses.) The Irvines moved to a much smaller property at Evandale, Tasmania in 2013. Illness obliged them to sell it at the end of 2014. Bill died in September 2017; Susan died on 6 September 2019.

== Books ==
- St Leon, Susan and Novak-Niemela, Jaroslav (1970). Allerhand von Überall : a hundred passages for translation and comprehension. Libraries Australia.
- Irvine, Susan (1992). Garden of a thousand roses : making a rose garden in Australia. South Yarra, Vic.: Hyland House. ISBN 0947062963.
- Irvine, Susan (1994). A hillside of roses : with a description and illustrated list of Alister Clark roses. South Yarra, Vic.: Hyland House. ISBN 1875657371.
- Irvine, Susan (1996). Fragrant roses. South Melbourne, Vic.: Hyland House. ISBN 1875657908. Design by Alison Forbes.
- Irvine, Susan (1997). Susan Irvine's rose gardens (trade paperback ed.). South Melbourne: Hyland House. ISBN 9781875657834. A combination of the 1992 and 1994 books.
- Irvine, Susan (1997). Rose gardens of Australia. Ringwood, Vic.: Penguin. ISBN 067086921X.
- Irvine, Susan (2003). The garden at Forest Hall. Ringwood, Vic.: Viking. ISBN 9780670041404.
- Irvine, Susan (2007). Rosehips & crabapples. Camberwell, Vic.: Lantern. ISBN 9781920989729.

Fragrant Roses was illustrated with photos by Gary Aitchison. All later books have photos by Simon Griffiths. They lack the vividly eccentric character of the early books laid out for Hyland House by Al Knight using Irvine's own amateur photos.

== See also ==
- Alister Clark
- Alister Clark Memorial Rose Garden
