= Thomas Garnett =

Thomas Garnett may refer to:

- Thomas Garnet (or Garnett) (c. 1575–1608), English saint
- Thomas Garnett (physician) (1766–1802), English physician
- Thomas Garnett (manufacturer) (1799–1878), manufacturer and naturalist
- Thomas Garnett (footballer) (1900–1950), English association footballer
- Tommy Garnett (1915–2006), English and Australian headmaster, horticulturist, ornithologist, cricketer and author
