= Rosa 'Mrs Fred Danks' =

Rose cultivar

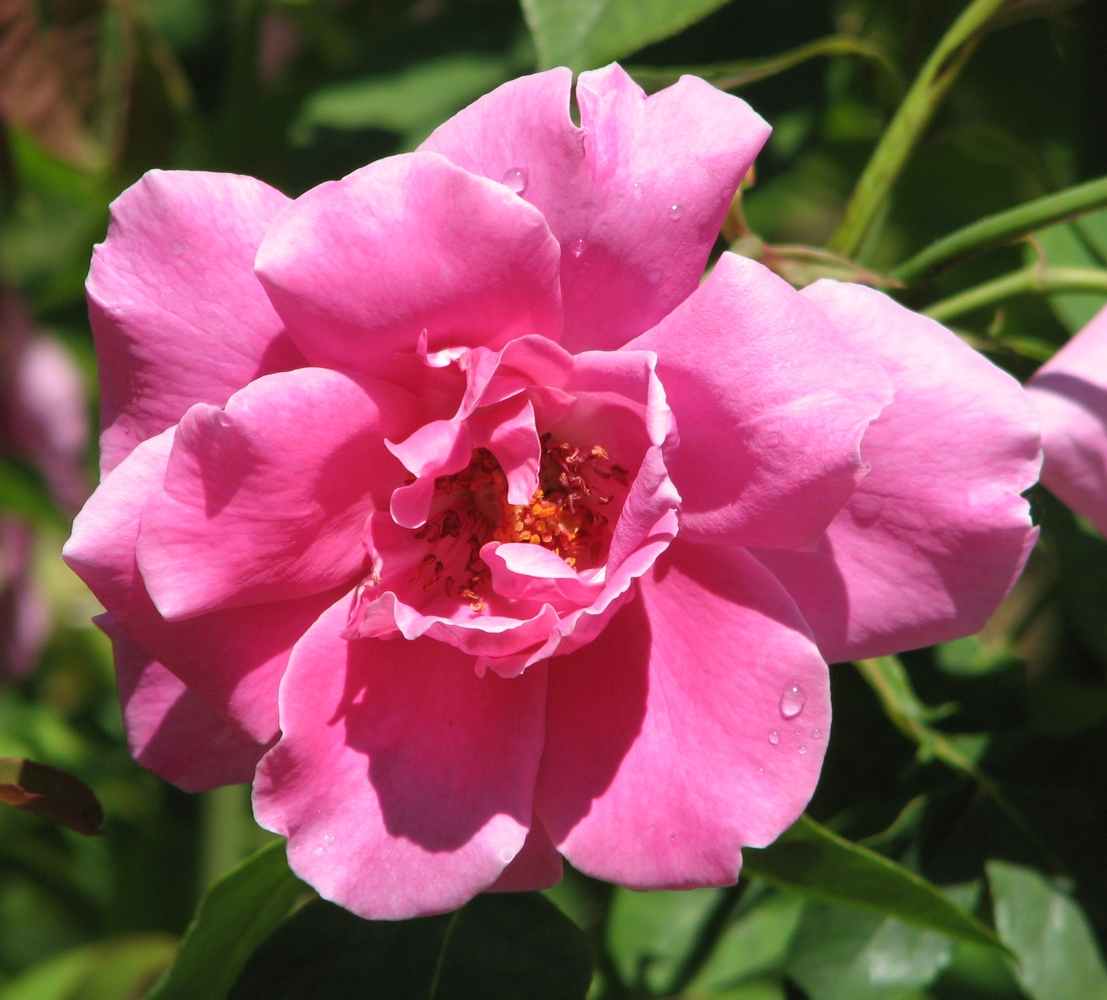
- Hybrid parentage: Rosa hybrid
- Cultivar: 'Mrs Fred Danks'
- Origin: Alister Clark, Australia, 1952.

Rosa 'Mrs Fred Danks' is a hybrid tea rose cultivar which was bred by Alister Clark (1864–1949), and introduced after his death in Australia in 1952. The plant was named after a friend of Clark's.

== Description ==
'Mrs. Fred Danks' is a tall upright shrub, 5 to 7 ft (150–200 cm) in height with a 3 to 5 ft (91–151 cm) spread. Blooms are large, 4–5 in (10–12.7 cm) in diameter, with a large semi-double (15–25 petals) bloom form. According to Charles and Brigid Quest-Ritson, in The Encyclopedia of Roses, "The tall, elegant buds are pale crimson, but the flowers open lilac pink with paler pink petal backs, and a creamy white center. They fade to pale pink and near white in hot weather." The rose has a strong fragrance and large, dark green foliage. 'Mrs. Fred Danks' is an excellent garden rose. It blooms in flushes from spring through fall.
