= Edward Garnett (cricketer) =

English cricketer

Edward Garnett (born 2 June 1965 (age 60)) was an English cricketer. He was a left-handed batsman and right-arm medium-fast bowler who played for Cheshire. He was born in Lancaster.

Garnett, who represented Cheshire in the Minor Counties Championship between 1993 and 2000, made a single List A appearance for the team, in the 1996 NatWest Trophy, against Cheshire. From the lower order, he scored 0 not out.
