= Nick Garnett =

English journalist and radio broadcaster

Nick Garnett is an English journalist and broadcaster with the British Broadcasting Corporation. He works for the broadcaster's national TV news bulletins, the BBC News Channel, network radio stations and the BBC News website.

== Biography ==
Garnett worked at a number of local radio stations before joining BBC Radio 5 Live in 1994. In 2020 he became one of the BBC's North of England Reporters.

In 1998 he was one of the first field reporters at the BBC to be issued with a Nera M4 Satellite in 1998 which enabled him to operate as a single-person radio broadcaster. His work during the British General Election of 2010 was reviewed in The Daily Telegraph.

He has written about his life as a reporter working overseas as he travelled from Nepal to Tunisia and Eastern Europe in 2015.

In recent years he has moved from using traditional audio recorders to using an iPhone to record, mix and send material from the field to his radio station: known as Mobile journalism. He was one of the first broadcasters to use a live streaming camera application to broadcast live TV pictures for broadcast on the BBC News Channel from an iPhone.

He has reported on court cases including that of the nurse Lucy Letby and Brian Buckle who spent five and a half years in prison for crimes he didn't commit. In June 2024 he covered the disappearance of Jay Slater in Tenerife on TV and the BBC website.
