= A. Y. P. Garnett =

American physician

A.Y.P. Garnett
- Born: Alexander Yelverton Peyton Garnett; September 8, 1820; Essex County, Virginia, United States
- Died: July 11, 1888 (aged 67)
- Education: University of Pennsylvania; George Washington University
- Occupation: Physician
- Spouse: Mary Wise

Alexander Yelverton Peyton Garnett (September 8, 1820 – July 11, 1888) was an American medical doctor. He was President of the American Medical Association, and served Jefferson Davis and Robert E. Lee during the American Civil War. He was a graduate of the George Washington University Medical School.

== Early life ==
Alexander Yelverton Peyron Garnett was born in essex country, September 19th, 1820. He was the son of Muscoe Garnett and Maria Battile, his wife. Among ancestry were many of the best known old families of Virginia. His childhood was spent at his home, and his education conducted under private tutors.

== Biography ==
Garnett began studying medicine at the University of Pennsylvania at the age of nineteen, and graduated in 1842. After graduation, he was appointed Assistant Surgeon in the Navy. His first cruise was to the Pacific, under Commodore Cornelius Stribling, on the American steamer USS Cyane. On a subsequent cruise to South America, he met his wife, Mary Wise, daughter of then United States Minister to the Court of Brazil, Henry A. Wise. After his marriage he was stationed temporarily at Washington, but later resigned his position in the Navy and began his career as a civilian physician. He was then elected to the chair of Theory and Practice of Medicine in the National Medical College of Columbian University.

At the outbreak of the American Civil War his sympathies were with his native state of Virginia; he left Washington for Richmond, Virginia, where he remained until the close of the war. So many of his friends and former patients were in this city that he very soon found himself actively engaged in as large a practice as he had had in Washington. Dr. Garnett was appointed surgeon in the Confederate Army, and placed in charge of two hospitals. He was also a member of the Board of Medical Examiners to examine applicants for admission to the Medical Corps. These positions he continued to hold during the entire war. He was the physician of General Robert E. Lee and family, as well as to the families of Generals Joe Johnston, Wade Hampton, William Preston Johnston, John C. Breckinridge, and of many members of the Confederate Cabinet and Congress.

At the termination of the war in 1865, when Richmond was evacuated, Dr. Garnett, at the request of Jefferson Davis, accompanied him as a member of his personal staff, but after the surrender of Johnston's army he returned to Richmond a paroled prisoner. He resumed the practice of his profession in Richmond, but in 1865 returned to Washington where he immediately found himself engaged in active practice and in lecturing. He was elected to the chair of Clinical Medicine in the Medical Department of Columbian University, which position he held for many years. He also became one of the Board of Directors of the Children's Hospital, and served as President of the Medical Society and of the Medical Association of the District of Columbia. In 1874, he was chosen President of the Southern Memorial Association of Washington, and selected to deliver the oration upon the occasion of the interring of the dead of Early's army, who had fallen in the attack upon Washington. His address upon that occasion was conciliatory in its tone.

Dr. Garnett was elected President of the American Medical Association, and presided at its meeting in 1886. His address on medical education excited a great deal of notice and approval at the time, as he brought into very broad relief the evils of medical education in this country. His last public work was in connection with the meeting of the International Medical Congress, held in Washington in 1887. It is well known how many obstacles and difficulties attended the completing of the arrangements for that meeting and it was only by dint of most arduous labor and untiring energy that Dr. Garnett, as Chairman of the Committee of Arrangements, gave it so large a measure of success. There is no doubt that the anxiety of mind and physical fatigue attendant upon his duties at this time helped to bring on the death of Dr. A. Y. P. Garnett, a failure of health which ended in his sudden death in the summer of 1888 at Rehoboth Beach, Delaware.

== Works ==
Dr. Garnett contributed a number of papers to medical journals, which were all of great practical value and interest. The paper which he read at the meeting of this Society, in 1887, entitled “Observations on the Sanitary Advantages of Tide Water Virginia” is a fair example of his thoroughness in the treatment of medical questions. Other papers are:

- “Condurango as a Cure for Cancer”
- “The Potomac Marshes and their Influence as a Pathogenic Agent”
- “Epidemic Jaundice among Children”
- “The Sorghum Vulgare or Broom-Corn, Seed in Cystitis”
- “Nelaton's Probe in Gunshot Wounds”
- “Coloproctitis treated by Hot-Water Douche and Dilatation or Division of the Sphincters”
