= Arthur William Garnett =

- Born: 1 June 1829; Westmoreland
- Died: 1861 (aged 31–32); India
- Resting place: St. Paul's Cathedral, Calcutta
- Citizenship: British
- Education: Addiscombe Military Seminary
- Spouse: Mary Charlotte Barnard
- Parent: William Garnett
- Engineering career
- Discipline: Military and civil
- Institutions: Bengal engineers
- Projects: Fort of Kohât, Fort at Bahadur Khel, Fort Garnett

Arthur William Garnett (1829–1861) was an English military and civil engineer in India from the time of the Second Anglo-Sikh War until just after the Indian Rebellion of 1857.

== Life ==
Arthur William, the younger son of William Garnett of Westmoreland, inspector-general of inland revenue, was born 1 June 1829. Garnett was educated at Addiscombe Military Seminary, where he obtained his first commission in 1846, and proceeded to India in 1848 as a lieutenant of the Bengal Engineers. He was appointed assistant field engineer with the army before the conflict at Mooltan, and wounded while in attendance with Sir John Cheape reconnoitering the breaches, but was able to take charge of the scaling-ladders in the subsequent assault. He joined the army under Lord Gough, held the fords of the Chenâb during the victory at the Battle of Gujrat, and went forward with Sir Walter Raleigh Gilbert's flying column in pursuit of the Afghans. Having taken part in the first survey of the Peshawûr valley with Lieutenant James Walker (afterwards surveyor-general of India), he was next engaged on public works at Kohât, where in 1850 the sappers employed under his command in making a road to the Kothul were surprised in their camp by the Afridis. Garnett and Sir F. R. Pollock (then Lieutenant), who was also stationed at Kohât, were surrounded, but held their position until the arrival of a relieving force from Peshawûr under Colin Campbell, 1st Baron Clyde, accompanied by General Charles J. Napier, by whom the Kohât pass was forced.

Garnett reconstructed and strengthened the fort of Kohât, designed and built the fort at Bahadur Khel for guarding the salt mines, as well as barracks, forts, and defensive works at other points on the frontier, including 'Fort Garnett,' named after him. He planted forest trees wherever practicable, constructed bridges, roads, and other works under circumstances of extraordinary difficulty, and in spite of serious obstacles mentioned in the published report of the administration, where the entire credit of the works is assigned to Garnett, who "has made very good roads, which he could not possibly have done without the possession of hardihood, temper, and good judgment."

He was constantly interrupted by being called upon to take the field with the several expeditions in the Dernjât, Meeranzaie valley, Eusofzaie country, Koorum valley, and Peiwer Kothul, and others, where there was frequently hard fighting. During the Indian Rebellion of 1857 Garnett was kept at his post on the frontier, where his experience and influence with the hillmen were of the greatest value. He came to England on leave in 1860, and was occupied in the examination of dockyard works, with a view to his future employment in the construction of such works if required at Bombay.

On his return to India in 1861, shortly after his marriage to Mary Charlotte Barnard of Crewkerne, by whom he had a posthumous daughter, and while temporarily acting as assistant to Colonel Yule, C.B., then secretary to government in the department of public works, he was attacked with pleurisy, and died aged thirty-one, after a few days' illness. He was buried in St. Paul's Cathedral, Calcutta, where his memory is recorded by a monument erected by his brother officers, other monuments being also placed in the church at Kohât, which he had built, and in the Church of Holy Trinity at Brompton.
