= William Garnett (civil servant) =

English civil servant (1793–1873)

William Garnett (1793–1873) was an English civil servant.

== Biography ==
Garnett, born in London on 13 November 1793, was the second and posthumous son of Thomas Garnett of Old Hutton, Kendal, who married Martha Rolfe, and died in 1793. By the premature death of his father, the care of William and his elder brother Thomas devolved at an early age on their cousin, Mr. T.C.Brooksbank of the treasury under whom they were educated, and eventually placed in public offices. William was appointed to the office for licensing hawkers and pedlars in 1807, at the age of only thirteen and a half years, and afterwards transferred to the tax office, in which he rose to the highest positions. He was deputy-registrar and registrar of the land-tax from 1819 to 1841, and was the author of valuable evidence on that subject given to the select committee on agricultural distress in 1836.

He was twice married: first, in 1827, to Ellen, daughter of Solomon Treasure, under-secretary for taxes, who died In 1819, by whom he had two sons, Frederick Brooksbank Garnett, created a C.B. in 1886 for his public services, and Arthur William; secondly, in 1834, to Priscilla Frances Smythe, who survived him for ten years. He died on 30 September 1873.

He was selected for the office of assistant inspector-general of stamps and taxes in 1835, and inspector-general in 1842. He took a leading part in the introduction of the income tax in Great Britain in 1842, and was the author of The Guide to the Property and Income Tax, of which several editions were published. He was also mainly instrumental in the successful establishment of the income-tax in Ireland in 1853, and author of The Guide to the Income-Tax Laws as applicable to Ireland. In 1851 he made a special visitation of all the assay offices in the United Kingdom, on which he reported to parliament, and valuable evidence on the subject was given by him to select committee of the House of Commons on 'gold and silver wares' in 1855 and 1856.

Garnett was not only distinguished for his long and eminent public services, but was in private life an admirable artist and musician.
