= Frank Riethmuller =

Australian rose breeder (1884–1965)

Frank Riethmuller (1884–1965) was an Australian rose breeder.

Studio photo of Frank Riethmuller in Townsville about 1910, when he was 26.

Riethmuller began to show roses in Sydney when he was about sixty.

== Biography ==
=== Toowoomba ===
The last child of poor German immigrant farmers, Francis Lewis Riethmuller (known as Frank) was born on 10 February 1884 in Glenvale, a village near (now a suburb of) Toowoomba, Queensland. When dealing with Germans, he reverted to writing Riethmüller. In Australia, the first syllable is pronounced Reith but never spelt that way.

Chronically prone to bronchitis and bronchiectasis, Riethmuller had to live mostly outdoors. First educated at Glenvale primary school, he spent two years as a state scholarship pupil at Toowoomba Grammar: every surname in the class was Anglo-Celtic except his. He worked 1899–1905 as a "pupil school teacher" at Gowrie Junction, Glenvale and Charters Towers, a gold-mining town.

=== North Queensland ===
Moving to Charters Towers was the start of a life-long search for somewhere to breathe properly. Eventually his bronchitis became so bad that he spent 1906–07 back at his parents', too sick to work. He returned at 23 to Charters Towers and worked 1908–13 as a bookkeeper to a butcher's chain. Bad health brought the job to an end, as it did most of his Queensland jobs. Charters Towers was said to be "good for his asthma"; it also had a big German-speaking population. Writing and speaking German, and devoted to his German inheritance, he may have found the First World War difficult. He was certainly unfit for the army, though he had trained in the CMF. Many people of German descent were persecuted, though Riethmuller was not interned.

From 1914 to 1918, he worked mostly as a Townsville tobacconist–bookmaker's shop assistant, sometimes as a bookkeeper on a sheep and horse-breeding station near Richmond.

In mid-1918 Riethmuller moved to a Brisbane pub to complete private study for the Junior Public Examination in English, French, German, Latin, Arithmetic and Algebra. Eleven hundred 15-year-olds sat the exam that November; Riethmuller was 34 years old.

=== Career in Sydney ===
After his four months of enforced confinement in Brisbane, he moved to Sydney and found a job as a "confidential clerk", code for a bookmaker's penciller. It was open-air work. He was outstandingly good at it and he never looked back.

As well as recording bets, he had to collect losing ones on Monday, settlement day. This was work for which his calm and gentlemanly manner was an asset. Riethmuller was making £1000 a year for working two or three days a week when the average annual salary of a clerk was about £370. He was possibly a silent partner in the bookmaking business as well. It was an income and career he kept up through the Great Depression and World War II until he retired in 1945. He allowed people to infer that he was clever with shares, but he made safe investments in land, treasury bonds, banks and in firms as safe as banks.

Riethmuller only had two employers, both very well known Sydney bookmakers. Jim Hackett was the between-wars equivalent of Bill Waterhouse post-war; Riethmuller worked for Hackett until he resigned to travel in Europe in 1928. When he returned, he worked until he retired for Frank Alldritt. Both employers were willing to travel during the war to Canberra to testify on Riethmuller's behalf. Alldritt disclosed that at the end of the day's racing he divided his entire takings uncounted between Riethmuller and his other clerk and provided each with a signed blank document for the bank.

Riethmuller made plans in 1939 to set up as a stockbroker but they were blighted by the war. After the war, well into retirement, he told Your Garden he was working as an accountant, but the duties seem to have been light.

=== Further education ===
At the same time as starting a new career, Riethmuller began a series of attempts to acquire a serious education in the Humanities, first at the University of Sydney, later at the University of Heidelberg. He made two long trips to Europe – Belgium, France, Switzerland, England, Germany, Italy – in 1928 and in 1931. He attended a one-month course in Conversational French at Grenoble in 1928. He also attended a six-week course in 1931 in German language, art, painting and architecture at the Institute for Foreigners at the University of Berlin. He made detailed plans to visit Germany again in 1937, but his attempt to enrol at Heidelberg perhaps foundered on the increasing Nazification of Germany, perhaps on his worsening health. He was back at Sydney in 1929. He spent World War II pursuing his interests in roses and race meetings, and as a university student of Italian and German (two of the three enemy languages). He led people to believe he was an Arts graduate who had also studied botany and "genetics at the University of Sydney." If so, it was doing independent reading in the library. He did eventually complete a major in German. And he did eventually bequeathed most of his estate to the University for medical research. At the university Riethmuller met Professor EG Waterhouse, learned in German, French, Italian and Japanese, innovative architect of house and garden, the world's greatest expert on the genus Camellia and a camellia breeder. Riethmuller was proud to call him "a personal friend".

=== Internment ===
For 20 years, Riethmuller lived in the now-vanished world of respectable Sydney boarding houses and residential hotels. He had rooms in five such places between 1918 and 1938, including nine years at "Wiesbaden" (at which a number of Germans stayed) in Bondi, and seven years at "Wychwood" in Turramurra on the North Shore. It was run by a Miss Hambledon, born Leontine Hamburger to German-Jewish parents in New York. She was 14 years older than he; they became friends. Occasionally they could be heard talking in German.

Unfortunately Miss Hambledon did not disguise her support for German expansion in Europe (though most of her relations in Germany had long since fled). After two months of police investigation, Riethmuller was arrested on 20 August 1940 and interned under National Security Regulation 26.

He spent 130 days all told in Long Bay Gaol, and in camps at Orange and Hay in country New South Wales. Of that time he spent 11 weeks in camp hospitals and Orange base hospital. Riethmuller's prison camp admission card ("Report on Prisoner of War"), dated 18 October 1940, incidentally gives the best documentation of his life history to that date.

Eventually he was able to force things to an inquiry ("lodge an objection") at which no good reason for detaining him could be sustained. Witnesses attested to his loyalty to the Empire and the Australian way of life. His interest in things German was part of his gentlemanly interest in culture generally. He admitted that his spoken Italian, French and German were not much good, but he made an excellent show of correcting official translations of German documents found in his possession. Allegedly he had had spy maps drawn of the La Perouse radio transmitter and the Chullora Railway Workshops; they turned out simply to be a plan of his own house and its Wireless Weekly radio aerial. German names in his address book were shown to be long-lost or never-met contacts beyond any hope of forming a spy ring; one made Riethmuller's suits at Anthony Hordern & Sons. Above all the committee of inquiry was impressed by the commitment of his investments and property to the Australian economy. Riethmuller's will at that stage left most of his money to Australian public hospitals. He was released 10 December 1940.

=== Turramurra ===
Riethmuller in old age in his Turramurra back garden. If those roses are hybrid teas bred by him, they are lost and probably no longer exist.

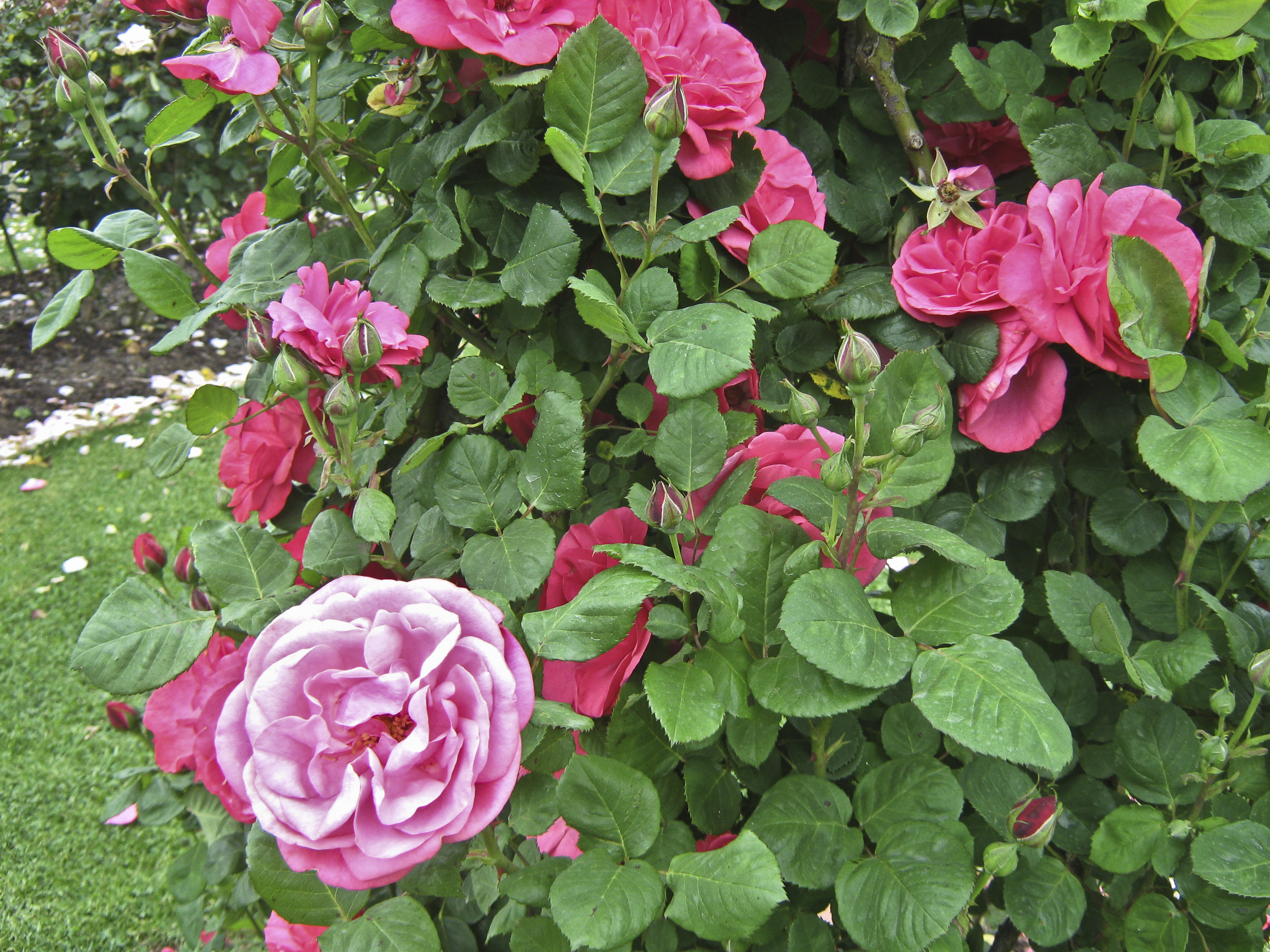
'Titian,' 1950. Deep pink blooms the size of coffee-cup saucers. Well formed at every stage and usually in flower.

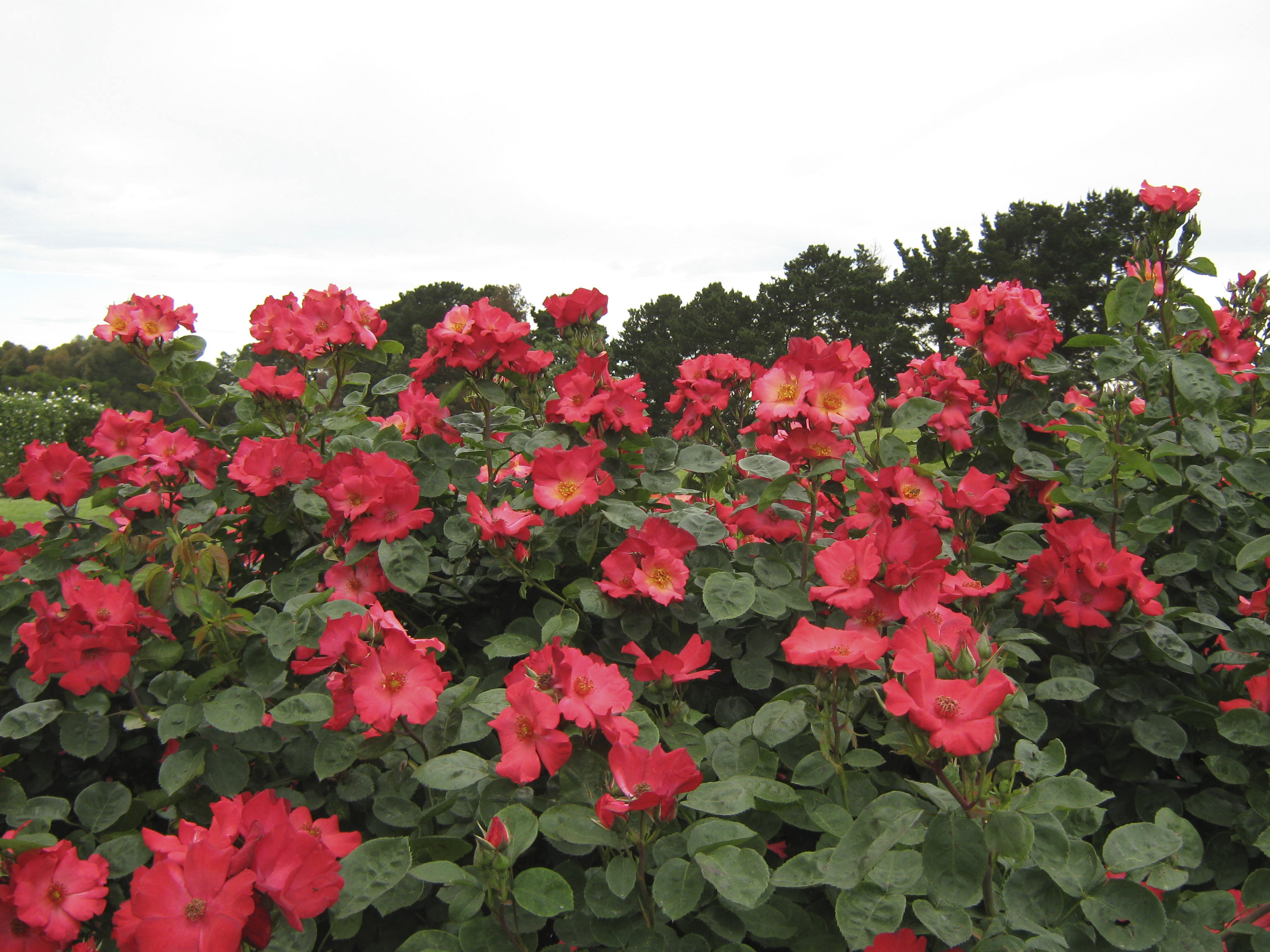
'Kwinana,' 1962. Shoulder high clusters of single, 8-cm, red-orange flowers. Some scent, musky. The overall impression is of dressy artifice.

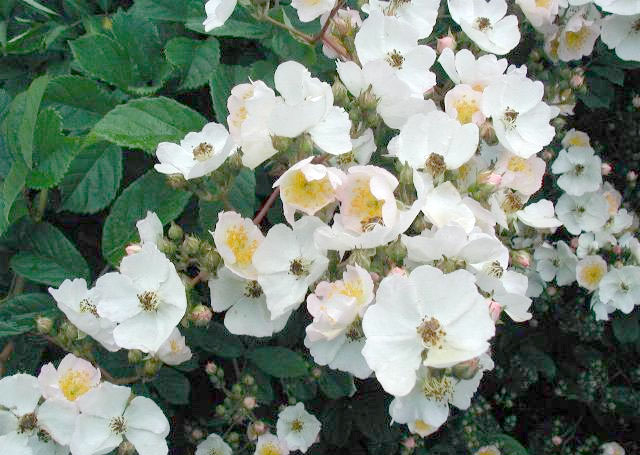
Rosa multiflora, the species foundation via Lambert's 'Gartendirektor Otto Linne' of all Riethmuller's Lambertianas.

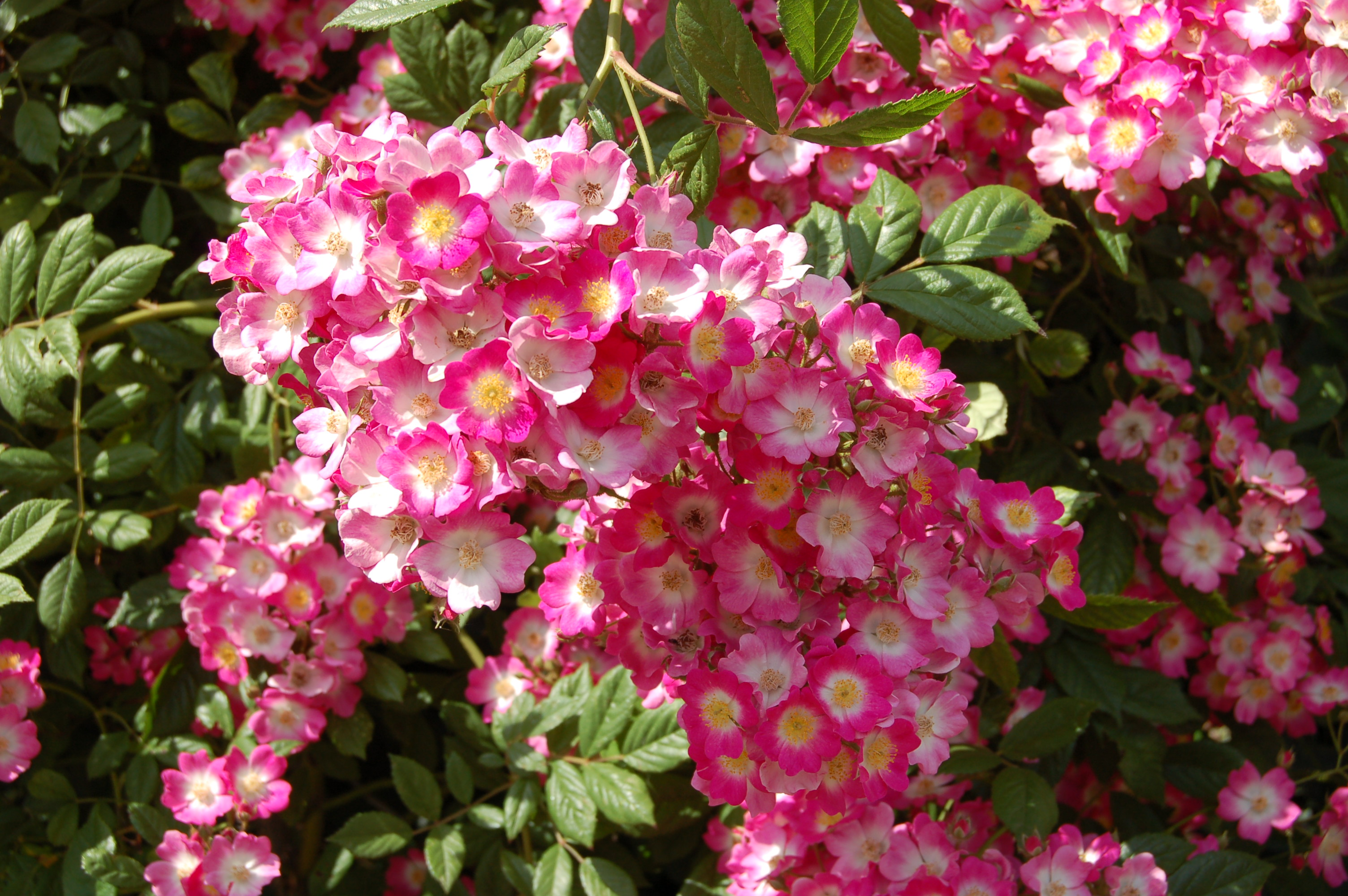
Lambert's 'Mozart' of 1936. A late example of the German tradition Riethmuller followed. Note the multiflora leaves.

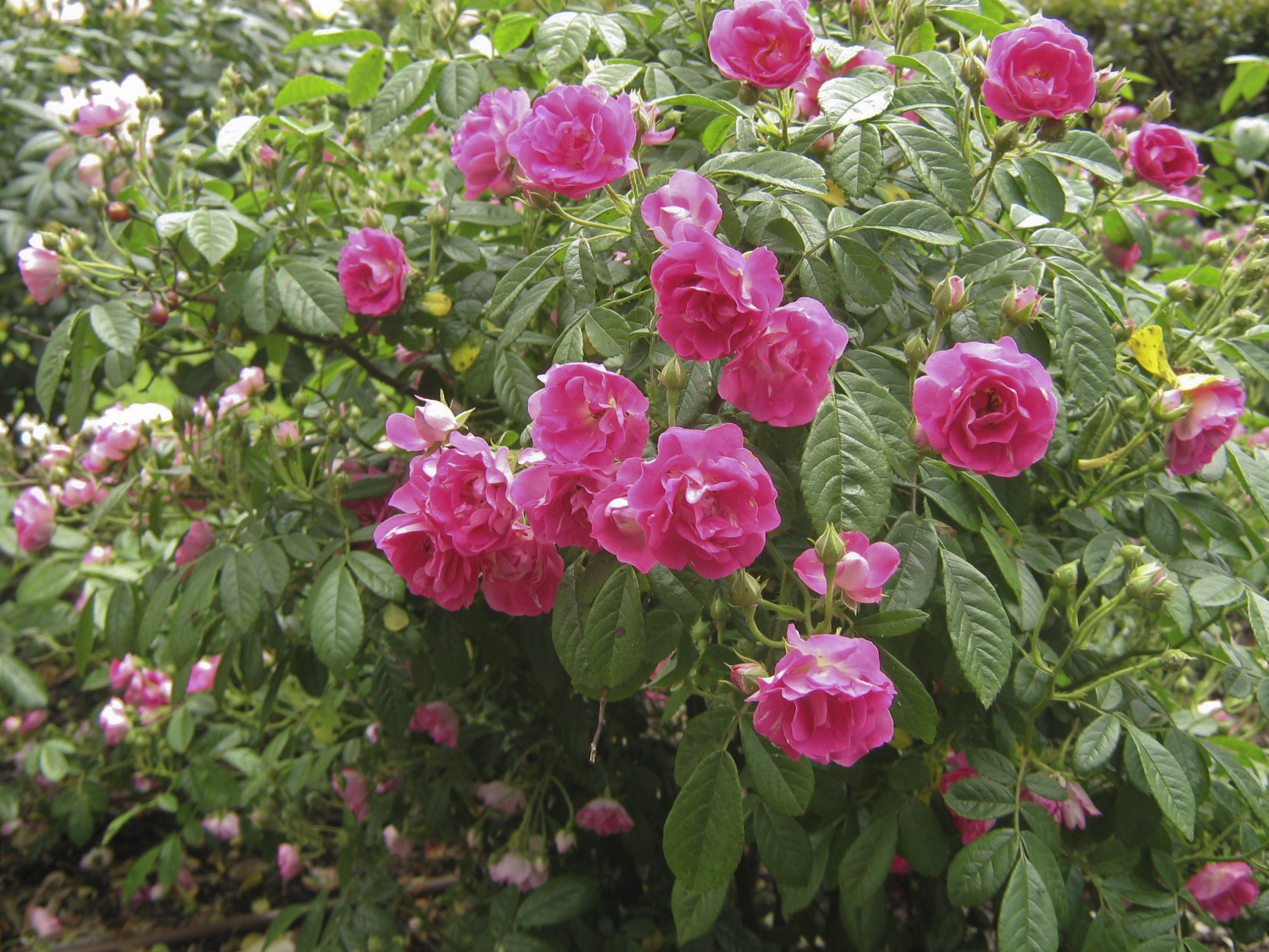
'Spring Song,' 1954. Low, wide and scented, little flowers in flushes all season. Like all Riethmuller's Lambertianas, a landscaping plant.

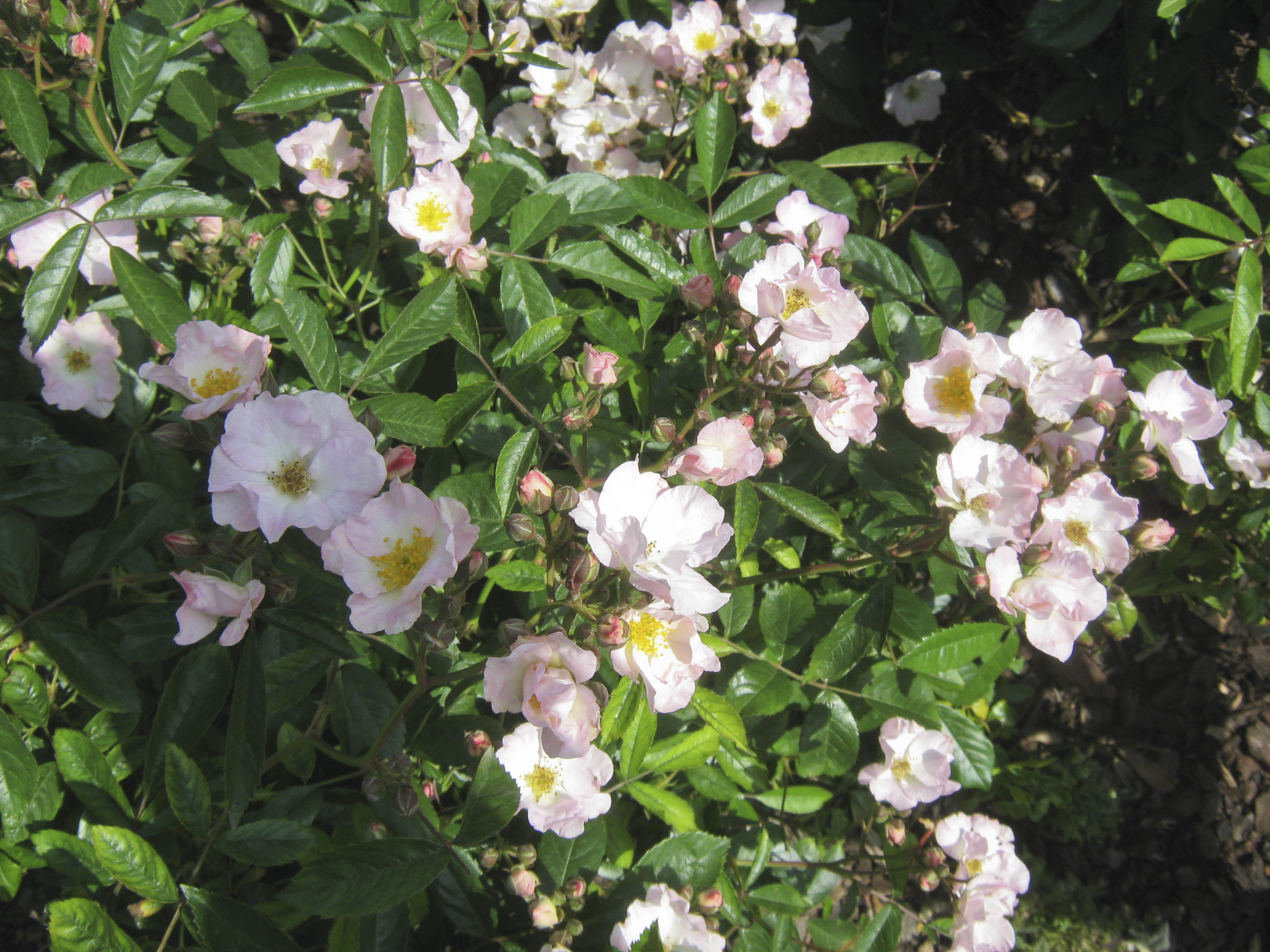
'Honeyflow,' 1957, looks like a wild rose which happens to flower all the time. Low growing with little pale pink flowers, strong honey scent and never without a bee.

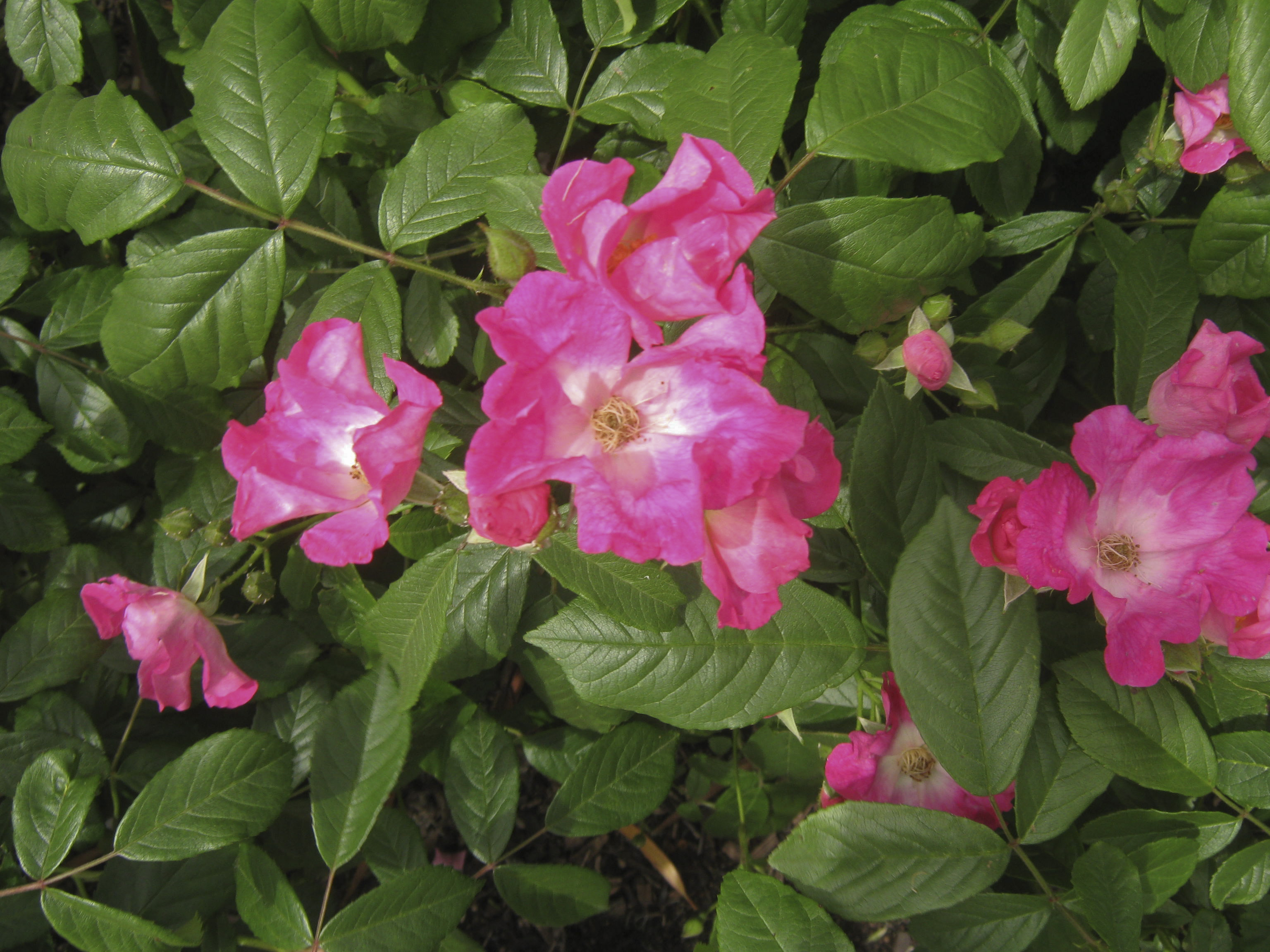
'Gay Vista,' 1955, demure as a sweet pea and equally hard to photograph. Some scent. A leafy shrub to five feet, flowering with occasional repeats. Named after a racehorse.

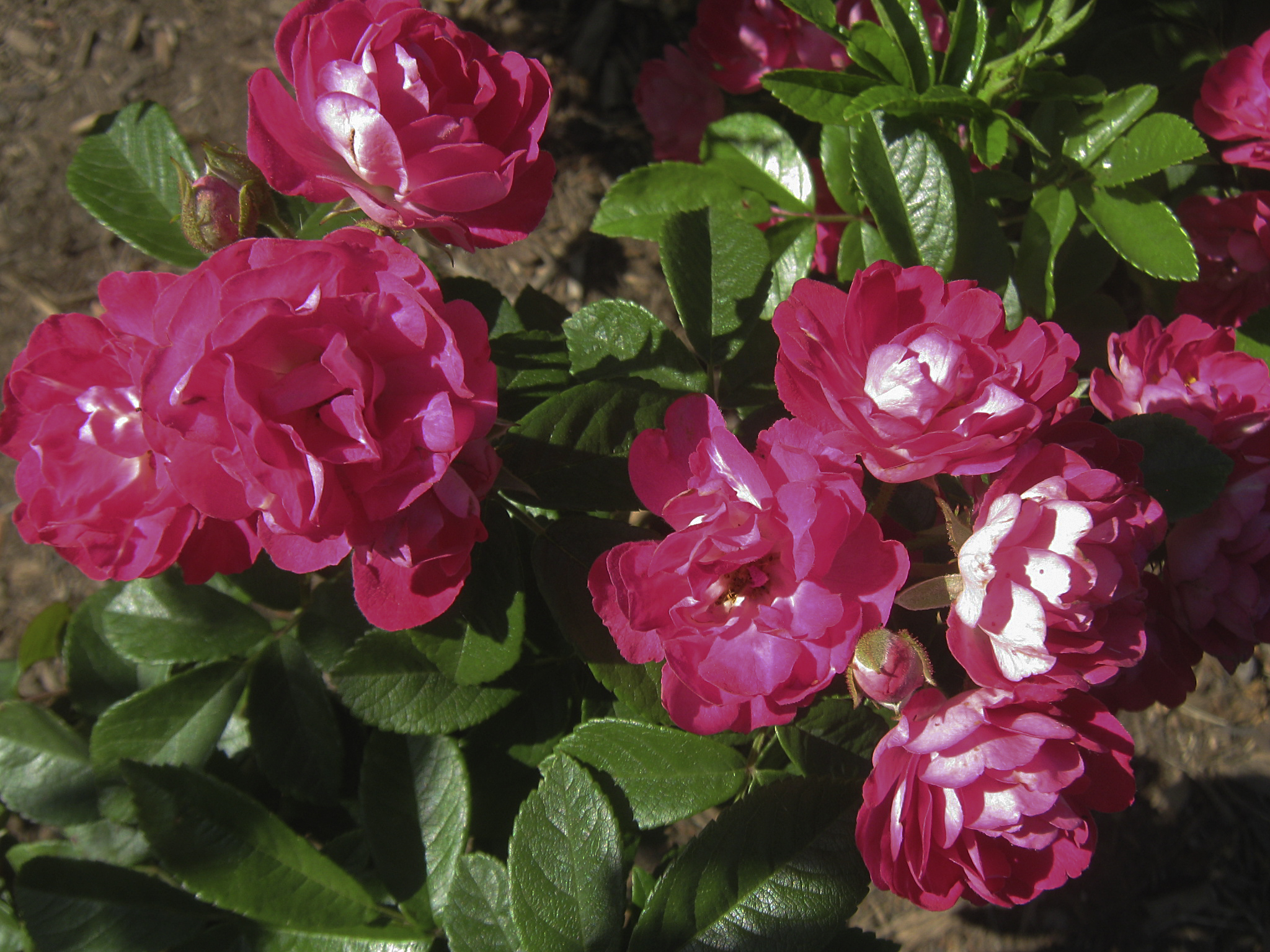
'Esmeralda,' 1957. Vivid 4-cm magenta-pink flowers, richly scented, recurrent on a low, dark, sprawling bush. Much more double and floriferous but paler in hot climates.

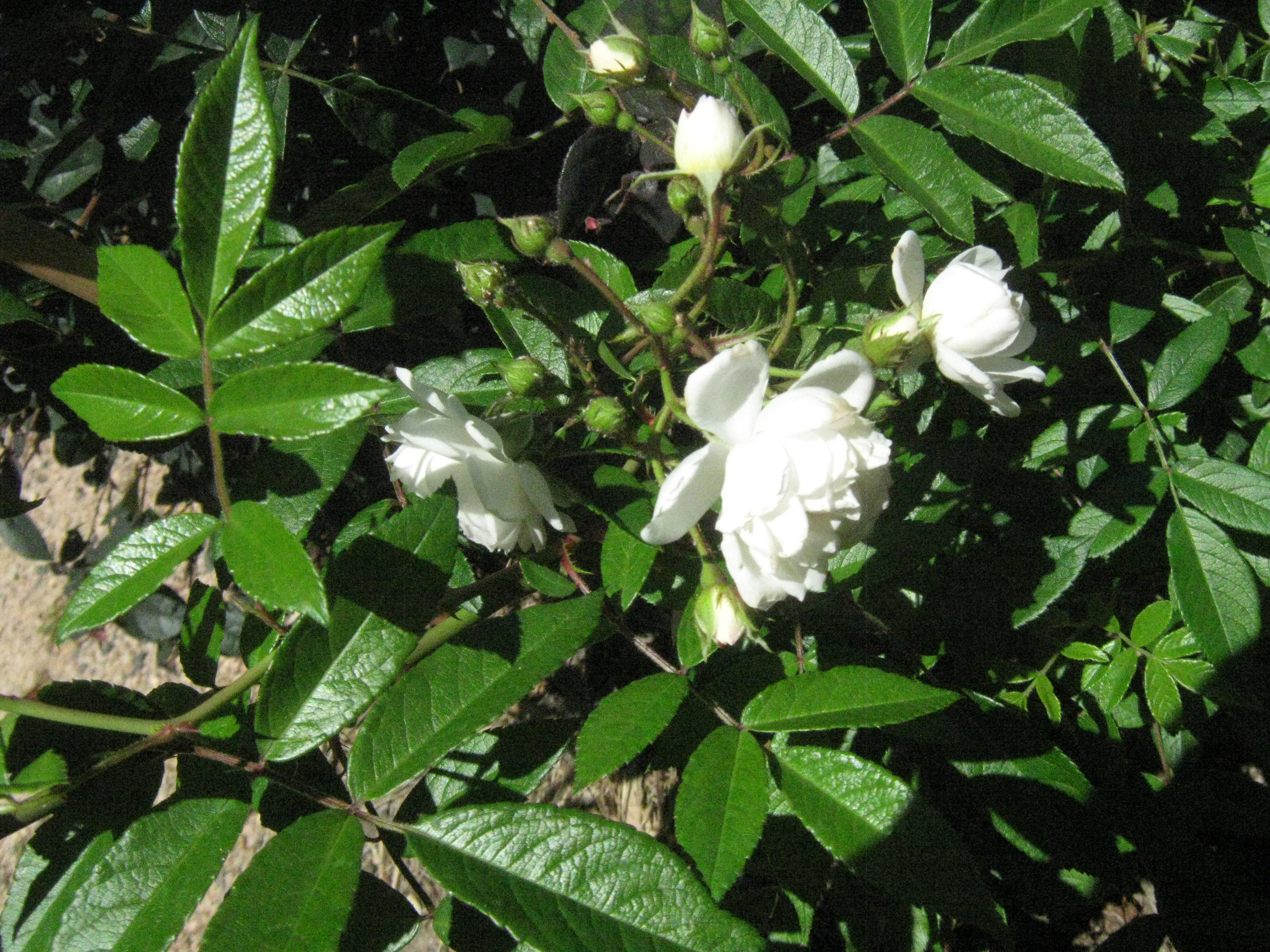
'Snow Spray' 1957. Scented white flowers in clusters on a low bush. The stamens are bright yellow.

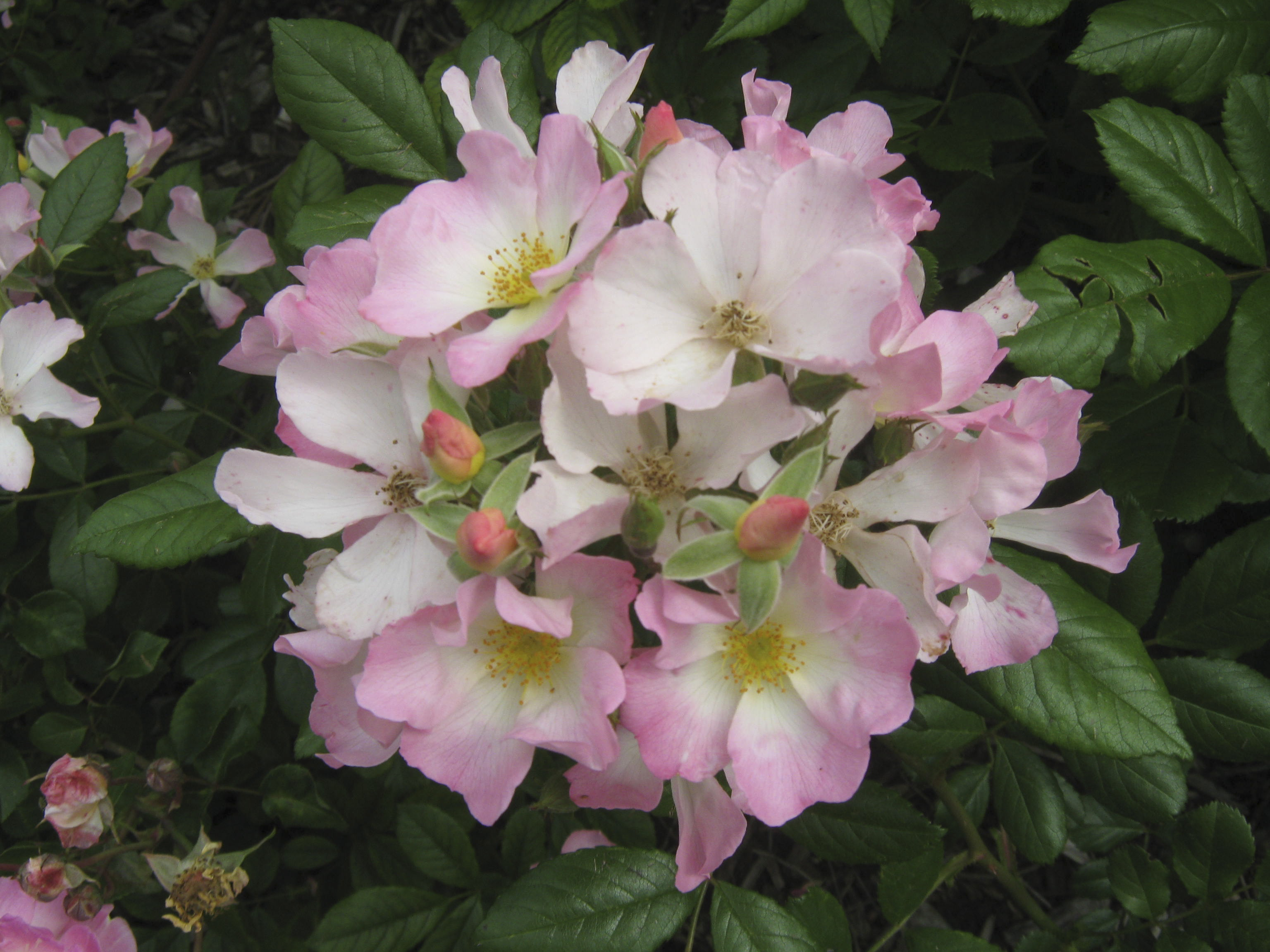
'Carabella,' 1960. Small single flowers perpetually on a chest-high bush. Sharp, fresh scent. Creased Multiflora leaves.

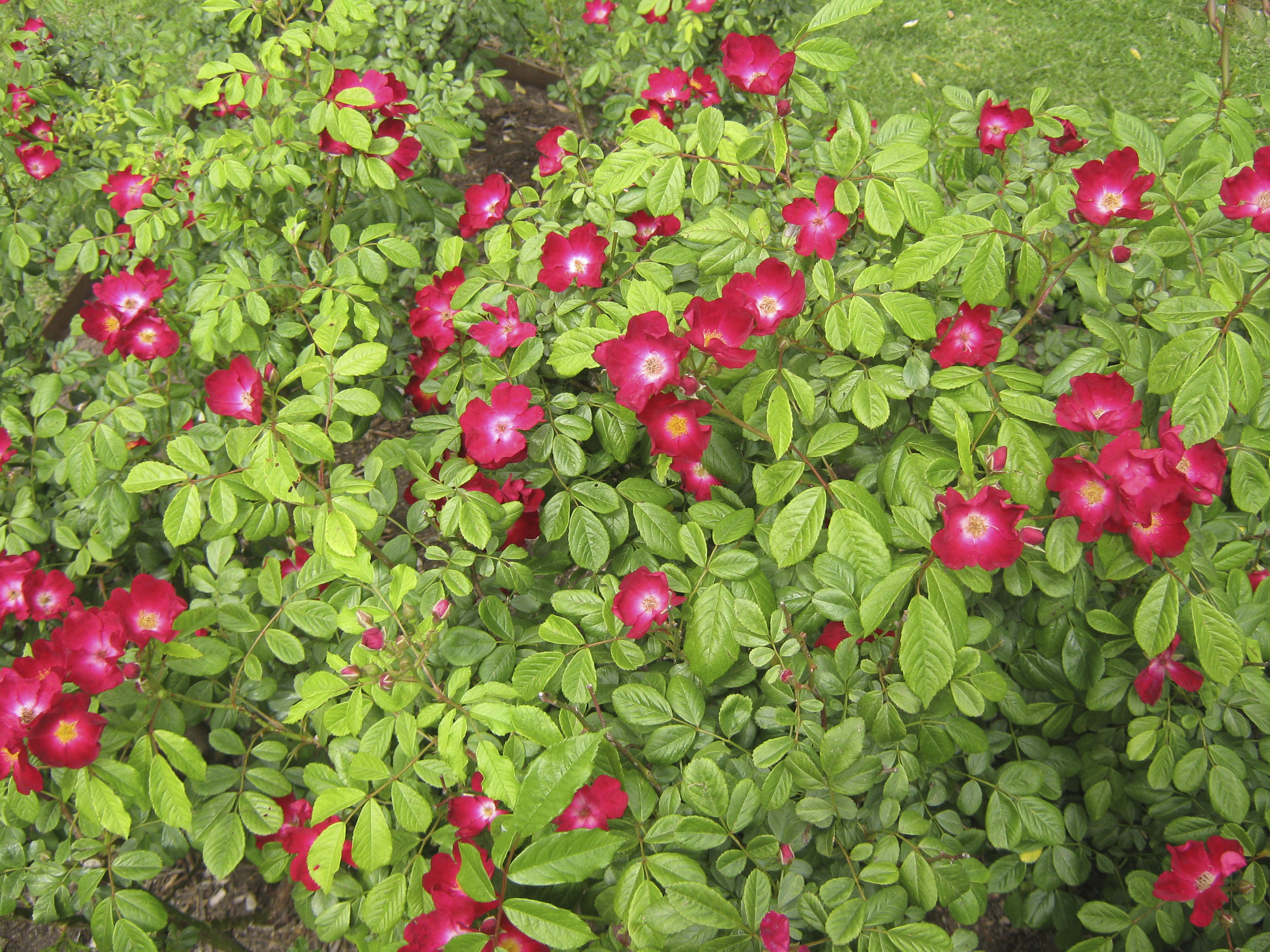
'Claret Cup,' 1962. Masses of small single flowers, intensely coloured and mildly scented.

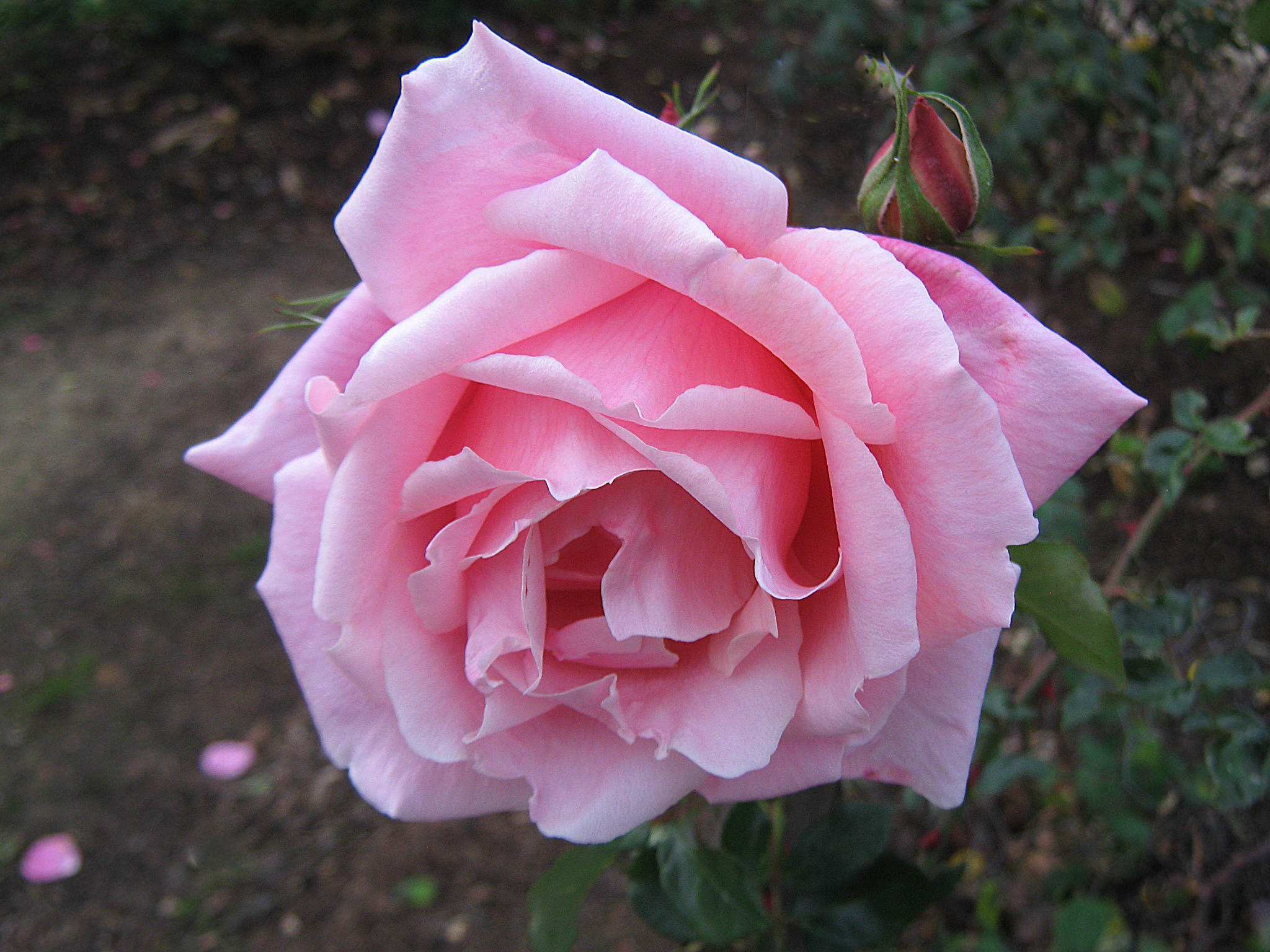
'Lady Woodward' 1959. Cupped hybrid tea form and very good hybrid tea scent.

Riethmuller's diaries confiscated by the security police show that he was growing roses (from Hazlewood Brothers) in Turramurra from 1932. In the mid-1930s he was more interested in dahlias and cactuses, renewing his interest in roses in 1937.

In 1937 he bought land (probably the land he was already using) a few streets from Miss Hambledon's boarding house. The same year he built a small art-deco house on it. He was joined there by his unhappily married sister Sophia Bischof (1878–1972) and her third daughter Elsie (1909–2004), who stayed till both her uncle and mother had died. A sign on the front gate said "Miss E. Bischof dressmaker" but mostly Elsie was the housekeeper. Riethmuller made health plans in 1940 to move to a higher and drier property in Bowral or Moss Vale but nothing came of them.

A next-door neighbour 1937–1939 remembered him as a homebody who, when he was not prostrated by illness, spent every day working in the garden.

Ayliffe's, a local rose and carnation nursery, supplied him with roses from 1938 and pruned them. Riethmuller was thus at least 54 and living in Turramurra when he made his first known rose crosses; 61 when he retired to full-time rose breeding in 1945; 66 when he released his first rose for sale. All his best roses that we know about were bred in his last decade when he was over 70 and his health at its worst.

"His large garden is packed with roses, a fair proportion of them of his own raising." Apart from his own seedlings, most roses he is known to have bred from are of German origin. He also bred from a couple of roses by Alister Clark, and emulated Clark's refusal to pamper seedlings: "He used to give his roses a post-pruning spray but didn’t spray at all otherwise. So his seedlings had to be disease-resistant to survive."

In the early 1960s Roger Mann was his teenage pupil: "The colour shot of Frank Riethmuller [shown on the right] is as I remember him. He's standing in his back garden, in his 'rose garden' – actually a big single bed that occupied about half the area, and which held most of his collection … At the very back next to the fence he had his nursery beds, compost heaps etc and the shed … It was a splendid sight in mid-winter, when the main rose beds were all pruned and smothered in manure and straw. The ground sloped from front to back and there was a flight of steps up to the back porch where we'd sit and talk, and camellias growing against the house there … The front garden was fairly conventional, with a low brick front fence with some floribundas – 'Eutin' among them as I recall – but mainly other plants behind it; the bed was fairly narrow and shaded by the street trees. The house was set close to the south boundary, and there was a curving path to the front door lined on one side by maybe a dozen roses, among which I remember 'Sunlit' and 'Marjory Palmer'. It led into a bed at the corner of the house which had 'Cara Bella', 'Honeyflow' and 'Claret Cup' with 'Spring Song', and down the north side of the house where the land was a bit wider were half-a-dozen original plants of 'Titian' trained espalier and reaching the eaves … I remember asking him why he'd registered it as a floribunda when it was so obviously a climber, and he said he hadn't realised at the time that it would grow like that.

Riethmuller died at 81 on 23 April 1965, bequeathing to the University of Sydney the proceeds of the sale of his house and garden: in 1972 they realised over $80,000, a big sum at the time.

=== Friends and relations ===
John Flynn was a doctor friend Riethmuller used to exchange drinks with at Tattersall's Club after the races. Dr Flynn told the 1940 internment tribunal, "He is a very mild mannered man … He was a genial, well-mannered, good citizen."

Queensland's great-nieces are old enough (and young enough) to remember their honeymoon visits to Sydney in the 1950s say "He was a lovely, sweet man, mainly interested in his wine collection and his roses." If it matters any more, he was rather tall, lean and blond, going grey in his fifties. He had a "long Riethmuller face", blue Nordic eyes and, in later years, a mouthful of gold teeth. Most people in his family say he had "unfailing generosity to others" . He waived all rights to royalties from roses he released for sale.

Above all, despite having lived away from his family for 27 years, Riethmuller took in his sister and her spinster daughter and supported both till the end of their lives, far beyond his own death. His sister lived on this support for 35 years, his niece for 67.

Riethmuller was a lifelong bachelor and there is no record of his having made any deep attachment beyond family and friends, usually married women. He was particularly close to his nephew Max Riethmuller (1912–1972) who, like him, never married.

Though he maintained strong family contacts, no rose is named for anyone in his family. Several are dedicated to socially prominent Sydney women.

'Kwinana' may have been a gift to a South Australian service club, but its colour alludes to the burn-off flames of the Kwinana oil refinery. 'Claret Cup' has masses of cup-shaped flowers, claret coloured. 'Galah' was the same pink as the breast feathers of a galah. 'Spring Song' was the Mendelssohn Song Without Words familiar to a hundred years of piano students.

His roses 'Alma,' 'Filagree' (misspelling of 'Filigree'), 'Gayness' and 'Helios' were all named after 1940s racehorses. 'Gay Vista,' 'Honeyflow' and 'Titian' were 1950s racehorses in Australia.

=== Legacy ===
Riethmuller's unmarried niece and housekeeper Elsie Bischof outlived him by nearly 40 years. After Riethmuller died, Elsie often showed people interested in the roses, 'Titian' especially, around Eastern Road (the property remained her mother's to use till she too died). Elsie returned to Toowoomba in 1972 and made his roses widely known there. Her constant advocacy seems to have been the main reason those she took with her survive.

Perhaps the leading rose thinker in Australia after the Second World War was the registrar of new varieties, AS Thomas. His book Better Roses went through many editions. The 1969 edition, in its chapter "Australian and New Zealand Roses", lists 80 "highly prized cultivars." Twenty are roses by the great Alister Clark. Next in importance come the roses of Riethmuller: 'Esmeralda,' 'Gay Vista,' 'Plaisante,' 'Silverelda,' 'Snow Spray,' 'Spring Song' and 'Titian.'

By the 1990s the task of collecting and cultivating the remaining roses was taken on by Phillip Sutherland of Golden Vale Nursery, Benalla. His plants came partly from NSW nurseries and collectors but also from relations and friends of Elsie in Queensland. He also is responsible for the survival of Riethmuller's only extant hybrid tea, Lady Woodward. Golden Vale closed in 2011, but the plants he sought out are now safely established in public collections.

== Roses ==
Riethmuller is known to have released 26 roses in total. Ten remain available, while many others have been lost. Several of the surviving varieties are noted for being healthy, well-formed, scented and floriferous. They are hardy in Australia from southern Tasmania to Mackay in north Queensland.

=== Floribundas ===
Floribundas are typically stiff shrubs, smaller and bushier than the average hybrid tea but less dense and sprawling than the average polyantha. The first of Riethmuller's surviving floribundas, and the best, was 'Titian.'

Riethmuller used Kordes' roses as breeding stock. In return the Kordes firm acted as Riethmuller's agent in Europe, where at least 'Titian' among his roses became well known. Riethmuller released 'Titian' in Australia in 1950, though he said he had bred it in 1937. Given his preference for German stock, it was probably a cross between a Kordes hybrid tea such as 'Crimson Glory' and a Kordes floribunda such as 'Eutin.' As Charles Quest-Ritson observed:

The flowers are semi-double and open out flat to a muddled centre and an old fashioned shape, like a Bourbon rose … it makes an excellent ever-blooming rose in warm climates like Australia's, and a sturdy, tall bush in cool climates like northern Europe's.

Riethmuller registered 'Titian' as a floribunda but others quickly realised it grew best as a short climber. Kordes' firm subsequently patented a climbing sport ('Tizian'), though that was more to secure European royalties than due to any change in the rose. Kordes particularly valued the resistance of 'Titian' to disease. It is still the most widely grown of Riethmuller's roses and easy to get from nurseries.

'Kwinana' came out in 1962, carefully designed for decorator effects with a shocking red-orange colour.

=== Lambertianas ===
Lambertianas descend from roses created by the German breeder Lambert in the 1920s using Rosa multiflora. To some rosarians they are simply members of the wider class of polyanthas, but Lambertianas have the characteristic leaf shape and scent of R. multiflora. By these criteria, some of Pemberton's Hybrid Musks descended from Lambert's 'Trier' are Lambertianas, some are not. But all of Riethmuller's polyanthas are Lambertianas.

Riethmuller adapted them to make mounds of perpetually flowering clusters of single flowers. In Sydney and similar climates they are all between knee and shoulder high: neither climbers nor dwarves nor ground-cover. In hot climates they grow much taller and the flowers cluster into spikes or corymbs inherited from R. multiflora. 'Spring Song,' a chance Lambert seedling, came out in 1954. From it he bred 'Ngarla,' released in 1955; 'Gay Vista,' 'Honeyflow' and 'Esmeralda,' all released in 1957; 'Carmel Bice' and 'Elaine White' in 1959, both now lost; 'Carabella' (or 'Cara Bella') in 1960; 'Claret Cup' in 1962. 'Carabella' in particular grows easily from cuttings and is always in flower.

Peter Cox and others have pointed out that 'Carabella,' like 'Titian,' can easily be grown as a pillar rose, some examples reaching 2.5 metres. In Toowoomba it can reach 3.7 metres.

Phillip Sutherland held 'Honeyflow' to be the best of all Australian garden roses for continuous flowering, and to have a "delicious scent".

‘Snow Spray' is a fragrant, double-flowered Lambertiana rose with multiflora leaves and yellow stamens. Reaching about one meter height and spread, it blooms continuously throughout the growing season. It is a self-pollinated variety of Gartendirektor Otto Linne but is sometimes incorrectly classified as floribunda.

'Chip's Apple Blossom' is a dwarf form of 'Carabella,' never registered. If it is true Riethmuller gave it to Miss Smallwood, he must have bred it by November 1939 when she became Mrs Farram. Much more likely he gave it to Mrs Farram in the late Fifties when he bred his other Lambertianas.

The well-known 'Cousin Essie' is not by Riethmuller but a seedling of his 'Honeyflow.' Nearly all Riethmuller's Lambertianas were bred from Lambert's 'Gartendirektor Otto Linne', but none has its shiny-as-beaten-metal leaves.

=== Hybrid Teas ===
Hybrid teas are shrubs with flowers high-pointed in the bud, opening to big scented double flowers, preferably recurrently. Riethmuller's 'Lady Woodward' came out in 1959. The deep pink 'Filagree' appeared in 1962; the dark red 'Denise McClelland' in 1964.

Roger Mann reports a red hybrid tea called 'Showboat' grown at Turramurra: "Not sure if he ever registered or introduced it. It was a bit like 'Ena Harkness' in flower, but with an even weaker neck." 'Showboat' may of course be identical to the rose registered as 'Denise McClelland.'

The only Riethmuller hybrid tea known still to exist is 'Lady Woodward,' available in a couple of public collections. Despite its Pernetiana ancestry it has dark green laurel-like leaves, forming a shrub lacking in hardness or angularity. The buds are long and pointed, with sepals extending beyond the bud. As the sepals separate, the buds show maroon, mahogany and burnt orange colour. The four-inch blooms – sometimes in clusters – have broad, veined, reflexed petals and yellow centres; they tend to look out rather than up. The blooms are light pink with a rich play of inner lights and shadows. Numerous big and stylish thorns start off pink to match the flowers, but turn berry red as they age.

=== Pernetianas ===
Riethmuller extended his hybrid tea breeding into Pernetianas. Pernet was the first to cross breed hybrid tea roses with the Persian yellow Rosa foetida. Pernetianas often had good scent and glowing combinations of red and yellow. Riethmuller characteristically took a Pernetiana bred by Kordes to make his own. 'Evelyn Buchan' came out in 1959 and 'Silverelda' (no doubt with silver tints somewhere) probably at the same time. Neither is known still to exist.

=== Sortable list of Riethmuller roses ===
Name	Date	Type	Colour	Pollen parent	Seed parent	Extant
Alma	1957	Floribunda	Crimson	Orange Triumph	Eutin	Lost
Amore	1957	Lambertiana	Deep Pink	Orange Triumph	Spring Song	Lost
Carabella	1960	Lambertiana	Single white with pink edges	Gartendirektor Otto Linne	Seedling	Yes
Carmel Bice	1959	Lambertiana	Pink blend	Gartendirektor Otto Linne	Seedling	Lost
Chip's Apple Blossom	1988 (named)	Dwarf Lambertiana	Single white with pink edges	Gartendirektor Otto Linne	Seedling	Yes
Claret Cup	1962	Lambertiana	Red with white centres	Spring Song	Eutin	Yes
Denise McClelland	1964	Hybrid tea	Dark red	Amy Johnson	New Yorker	Lost
Elaine White	1959	Lambertiana	White	Gartendirektor Otto Linne	Seedling	Lost
Esmeralda	1957	Lambertiana	Magenta	Gartendirektor Otto Linne	Seedling	Yes
Evelyn Buchan	1959	Pernetiana	Pink and yellow	Luis Briñas	Crimson Glory	Lost
Filagree	1962	Hybrid tea pillar	Deep pink	Titian	Sterling	Unknown
Florrie Joyce	1960	Unknown	Unknown	Unknown	Unknown	Lost
Galah	1956	Hybrid tea	Carmine-pink, i.e. galah-coloured	Unknown	Unknown	Lost
Gay Vista	1955	Lambertiana	Bright pink with white centres	Unknown	Unknown	Yes
Gayness	1955	Hybrid tea	Unknown	Unknown	Unknown	Lost
Helios	1960	Unknown	Unknown	Unknown	Unknown	Lost
Honeyflow	1957	Lambertiana	Blush pink	Spring Song	Gartendirektor Otto Linne	Yes
Kwinana	1962	Floribunda	Red-orange	Orange Triumph	Seedling	Yes
Lady Woodward	1959	Hybrid tea	Light pink	Heinrich Wendland	Elli Knab	Yes
Ngarla	1955	Lambertiana	Probably dark red	Unknown	Unknown	Unknown
Pearl Costin	1959	Hybrid tea	Yellow blend	Elli Knab	Amy Johnson	Lost
Plaisante	1957	Floribunda	Bright pink, lighter reverse	Borderer	Unknown	Lost
Rubens	1960	Unknown	Unknown	Unknown	Unknown	Lost
Silverelda	1959?	Pernetiana	Pink blend	Heinrich Wendland	Nancy Wilson	Lost
Showboat	no date	Hybrid tea	Red	Unknown	Unknown	Unknown
Snow Spray	1957	Lambertiana	White blend	Gartendirektor Otto Linne	Gartendirektor Otto Linne	Yes
Spring Song	1954	Lambertiana	Carmine-pink	Gartendirektor Otto Linne	Self	Yes
Titian	1955	Floribunda	Deep pink	Unknown	Unknown	Yes

=== Where Riethmuller roses can be seen ===
- The State Rose Garden in Newtown Park, Toowoomba has a complete Riethmuller collection: 'Chip's Apple Blossom', 'Carabella', 'Claret Cup', 'Esmeralda', 'Gay Vista', 'Honeyflow', 'Kwinana', 'Lady Woodward', 'Spring Song', 'Snow Spray' and 'Titian' (misnamed as 'Titan').
- The Heritage Rose Garden in the Botanic Garden of Orange, NSW has 'Lady Woodward', 'Carabella', 'Gay Vista' and 'Titian'.
- The old rose section of the Royal Botanic Gardens in Melbourne has 'Carabella' and 'Claret Cup' in island beds.
- The Victoria State Rose Garden at Werribee Park has 'Carabella', 'Claret Cup,' 'Honeyflow,' 'Kwinana' and 'Titian.'
- Nieuwesteeg Heritage Rose Garden in Maddingley Park, Bacchus Marsh, Victoria has 'Lady Woodward'. From the bandstand, it is the pink hybrid tea at the south end of the third bed from the left. The National Plant Collections Register of significant Australian rose cultivars is held by John Nieuwesteeg at Coldstream, Victoria. It also contains 'Carabella', 'Claret Cup, 'Gay Vista', 'Honeyflow', 'Spring Song' and 'Titian' but access is by application only.
- The National Rose Collection created by David Ruston at Renmark in South Australia has 'Carabella,' 'Spring Song' (sometimes sold as 'Bert Mulley'), 'Lady Woodward,' 'Titian,' and 'Chip's Apple Blossom.'
- The Morwell Centenary Rose Garden in Gippsland has 'Carabella', 'Claret Cup', 'Gay Vista', 'Esmeralda' (unlabelled), 'Honeyflow', 'Spring Song' and 'Titian.'
- The Adelaide Botanical Garden, South Australia has 'Titian.'
- The Kodja Place Roze Maze at Kojonup, Western Australia uses hedges of Australian roses, including a good collection of Riethmullers: 'Carabella', 'Claret Cup,' 'Esmeralda,' 'Gay Vista', 'Honeyflow,' 'Spring Song' and 'Titian.'

Few Riethmuller roses can be found in collections made outside Australia. 'Titian' and 'Snow Spray' are in the Europas-Rosarium at Sangerhausen in north Germany. 'Titian' is in the Rosarium Budatétény at Budapest. 'Titian' and 'Gay Vista' are in the catalogue of the Californian nursery Vintage Gardens.

=== Articles written by Riethmuller ===
FL Riethmuller (Turramurra, NSW), "Co-operative Rose Breeding", Australian and New Zealand Rose Annual (ANZRA), 1955, p112.

F Riethmuller (Sydney NSW), "Nora Cunningham", ANZRA, 1957, p135. A puff for the European release of the Alister Clark climber, 'Nora Cunningham.'

Frank Riethmuller (Turramurra, NSW), "Roses from Seed", ANZRA, 1960, p118. Shows how FLR actually thought as a breeder.

== Riethmuller in the Australian national archive ==
The National Archive of Australia is indispensable to researching Riethmuller's career. All his records are listed online under the heading Security and intelligence records. As can be seen in the table below, his name is often misspelt and there is some overlap between holdings in different cities.

Archive series	Date	Barcode	Location	Title	Contents	Available
A1539, 1940/W/3994	1940	6922353	Canberra	Trading with the Enemy Act, 1939 – Mr. F L Riethmuller	FLR's two-page letter asking permission to import two German texts about the German language, the brief official refusal and notification to another official.	Online
C123/1, 2679	1940–1943	3905523	Sydney	Reithmuller, Francis Lewis (Australian)	Seventy-nine pages of Security Service dossier, with lists of foreign books held, translations, public complaints and stat. decs. by complainants, official assessments of FLR as a security risk, record of arrest.	Online
C415, 70	1929–1945	7297693	Sydney	Frank Lewis Reithmuller [also known as Francis Reithmuller]	This series contains six very small Johnnie Walker Diaries 1931, 1933–1937, a 1930 Dewar's Diary, a 1929 Sydney University Union Diary, The Shooter's Year Book 1932, a folder containing copies of the magazines 'Mutterlpradje' (Jan–Aug 1939), 3 copies of the publication 'Proceedings of the Deutsche Akademie' 1936 vols 2–4, two postcards in German, newspapers cuttings, the libretto of an "evangelical cantata", "Die Krone des Lebens", one address book, invoices (mainly from German publishers) and correspondence from German acquaintances abroad. It also includes FLR's successful one-page application in German to matriculate from the University of Heidelberg. The address book and the diaries rarely record appointments: they are mostly memoranda of plants bought, phone numbers of friends and clients, shoe sizes and lasts, written-out Australian and European railway timetables, and scores of addresses of European pensions. The address book itself seems to have been conscientiously started in 1922 and later adapted to the same purposes as the diaries.	Open to physical inspection and being photographed
MP1103/1, PWN1389	1940	8613738	Melbourne	Prisoner of War/Internee: Riethmuller, Francis Lewis; Date of birth – 10 February 1884; Nationality – British	One-page card recording FLR's internment camps and dates	Online
MP1103/2, PWN1389	1940	9902704	Melbourne	Prisoner of War/Internee: Riethmuller, Francis Lewis; Date of birth – 10 February 1884; Nationality – British	One-page camp reception card.	Online
A367, C18000/42	1940	776278	Canberra	Objection No.71 of 1940. Reithmuller Francis Lewis. Advisory Committee	The 58-page transcript of his appeal against internment 20 November 1940	Online
A12102, 37	23 August 1940 – 20 November 1940	5169109	Canberra	Riethmuller, Francis Lewis – Objection No. 71 of 1940 ... Alien Advisory Committee	FLR's 9-page stat. dec. to the internment committee. Rest is same as barcode 776278, plus most of barcode 3905523.	Online
MP508/1, 255/742/61	1940	3382652	Melbourne	Francis Lewis Riethmuller – Release from internment	Four-page report of the ministerial advisory committee summarising Riethmuller's circumstances and concluding that "it is neither necessary nor desirable" that he remain interned. Five pages of related official correspondence. FLR's stat. dec. to the committee, identical to that included in barcode 5169109. Two-page application for ministerial warrant. The original detention order and 6 pages of related official documents, not the same as barcode 3905523.	Online
C123, 2683	24 October 1938 – 23 June 1948	3905526	Sydney	Hamburger, Miss Leontine aliases Hambleton and Hambledon (American – naturalised British subject)	Her complete Security Service dossier	Online
C415, 65	1932–1939	7283882	Sydney	Leontine Hambledon [? formerly Hamburger]	This item consists of a summary by Military Police Intelligence of biographical details of Leontine Hambledon; police certificates of good conduct for Lilly Lust, a relative of Leontine Hambledon; 3 postcards to Elsa Rose from Julius Schmitt, in German with English translations; the following correspondence to subject in German with English translations: a postcard, 2 letters and a Christmas card; correspondence mostly from European relations in German and English. There is some overlap with barcode 3905526.	Online
