= Tommy Garnett =

English cricketer (1915–2006)

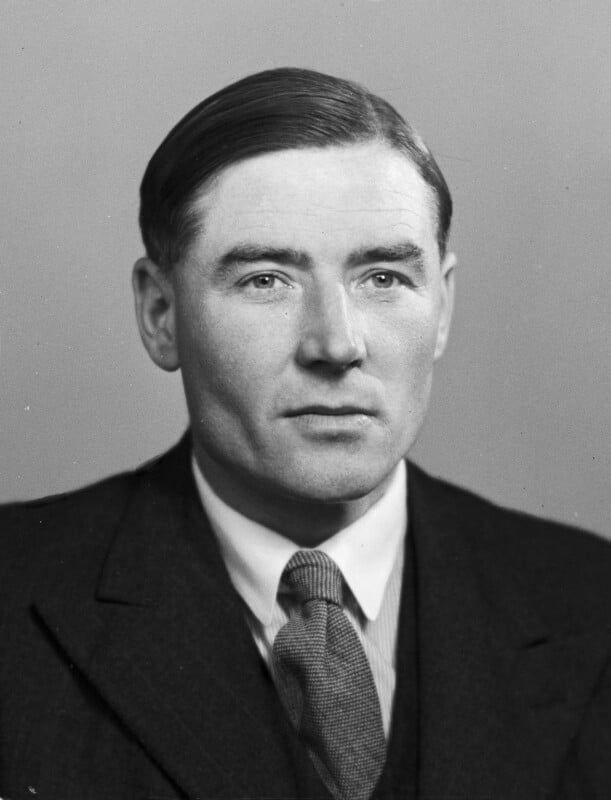
- Garnett in 1952

Personal information
- Full name: Thomas Ronald Garnett
- Born: 1 January 1915; Marple, Cheshire, England
- Died: 22 September 2006 (aged 91); Castlemaine, Victoria, Australia
- Batting: Right-handed
- Bowling: Right-arm off-break

Domestic team information
- Years: Team
- 1935–1939: Somerset

Career statistics
Competition	FC
Matches	5
Runs scored	161
Batting average	20.12
100s/50s	0/1
Top score	75
Catches/stumpings	6/–
- Source: CricketArchive, 22 December 2015

Thomas Ronald Garnett OAM (1 January 1915 – 22 September 2006) was an English and Australian headmaster, horticulturist, ornithologist and author. Before the Second World War, he played first-class cricket for Somerset.

== Early years ==
Garnett was born at Marple, Cheshire and educated at Charterhouse School at Godalming, Surrey, and studied classics at Magdalene College, Cambridge. He began his teaching career at Westminster School, London, and then returned to Charterhouse to teach classics. During the Second World War he served in the RAF Regiment in India and Burma. Following the war he returned to teaching and in 1952 was appointed Master of Marlborough College.

== Cricket career ==
As a cricketer, Garnett was a right-handed middle-order batsman. He did not play first-class cricket for Cambridge University, but appeared in a single match for Somerset against Cambridge in 1935. In 1939, he played in the last four matches before cricket was abandoned for the Second World War, and in the final game, he made his highest score, an innings of 75 in the match against Northamptonshire at Taunton. In 1953, he played in one Minor Counties match for Wiltshire.

== Australia ==
In 1961, at the age of 46, Garnett was appointed Headmaster of Geelong Grammar School in Victoria, Australia and he and his family made what was to be a permanent move to Australia. He was the headmaster when Prince Charles spent two terms at Geelong Grammar School.

Garnett was a keen amateur ornithologist and joined the Royal Australasian Ornithologists Union (RAOU) in 1964. In 1974, upon his retirement from Geelong Grammar, he became secretary of the RAOU and served in that position until 1980. As secretary he bore the brunt of the administrative load of a body undergoing major change as it evolved from what had become largely a birdwatching club into a scientific conservation organisation undertaking ventures such as the Atlas of Australian Birds project.

From 1980 Garnett devoted himself to developing the Garden of St Erth at Blackwood, Victoria, emphasising the use of Australian native plants in horticulture. The Garden was one of Australia's first private gardens opened to the public in the modern era. From 1980 to 1997 he also wrote a regular column for The Age, published in Melbourne. In 1984 Garnett contributed to the government's project to rejuvenate Victoria's country botanic gardens, and in the early 1990s successfully advocated the establishment of an independent board for the Royal Botanic Gardens, Melbourne. In 1996 he was awarded the Medal of the Order of Australia (OAM) for contributions to horticulture.

== Publications ==
Compilations of articles authored by Garnett include:

- 1984 - Stumbling on Melons. A selection of articles published in 'The Age'. Lothian Publishing: Melbourne. ISBN 0-85091-187-7
- 2003 - Bits and Pieces. A selection of writings published between 1980 and 1995 in The Age, Melbourne. Author: Castlemaine.
