= Gowrie (disambiguation) =

Gowrie is a province in Scotland.

Gowrie may also refer to:

== Australia ==
=== People ===
- Alexander Hore-Ruthven, 1st Earl of Gowrie (1872–1955), British soldier, longest-serving Governor-General of Australia
- Zara Hore-Ruthven, Countess of Gowrie, wife of Alexander Hore-Ruthven, 1st Earl of Gowrie, after whom Lady Gowrie Child Centres were named

=== Places ===
==== Australian Capital Territory ====
- Gowrie, Australian Capital Territory, a suburb of Canberra

==== New South Wales ====
- Gowrie, New South Wales, a locality

==== Queensland ====
- Gowrie, Queensland, a town in the Toowoomba Region
- Gowrie House, a heritage-listed villa in Toowoomba
- Gowrie Mountain, Queensland, a locality in the Toowoomba Region
- Shire of Gowrie, a former local government area, now within the Toowoomba Region

==== Victoria ====
- Gowrie railway station, Melbourne
- Gowrie, Coburg, a heritage-listed house in Melbourne

== United Kingdom ==
- Carse of Gowrie, the southern part of Gowrie noted for its farmland
- Gowrie Park, Dundee, Scotland
- Earl of Gowrie, a peerage title in Scotland and the United Kingdom, including a list of people with the title
- Gowrie House, Perth, Scotland

== United States ==
- Gowrie, Iowa, United States
- Gowrie Township, Webster County, Iowa, United States

== Other uses ==
- MV Gowrie, a number of motor vessels with this name
- SS Gowrie, a number of steamships with this name
- The Gowrie conspiracy or Gowrie Plot, a 1600 conspiracy to assassinate King James VI of Scotland

== See also ==
- Lord Gowrie (disambiguation)
