= Pamela Cooper =

British courtier and humanitarian (1910–2006)

Pamela Margaret Cooper (née Fletcher; 24 October 1910 – 13 July 2006), known as the Hon. Mrs Patrick Hore-Ruthven between 1939 and 1945, and as Viscountess Ruthven of Canberra between 1945 and 1952, was a British courtier, campaigner for refugees, and humanitarian.

== Biography ==
She was born in Chelsea, London, into an upper-middle-class family. Her father, Rev (later Canon) Arthur Henry Fletcher, was a scion of a family of Church of Ireland clergymen from County Waterford; her mother was the former Alice Hodgson. After her birth, the family moved to Merrow, Surrey, where her father became rector. He served as an Army chaplain in the France during the First World War. Her education at Guildford High School was interrupted when her father was sent to become a minister in Sanremo on the Italian Riviera, posted there for his health.

Although her family called her "Frog", she became a well-known beauty in London society in the 1930s.

She met Patrick Hore-Ruthven during a stag hunt on Exmoor in 1932; he had been rusticated from the University of Cambridge due to a youthful indiscretion – he had bitten a policeman's nose. Their mutual lack of money delayed matters, but they were married at Westminster Abbey on 4 January 1939, with her father officiating. Their first son, Alexander Patrick Greysteil (known as Greysteil or Grey, from one of his middle names), was born on 26 November 1939.

Hore-Ruthven was an officer in the Rifle Brigade and was posted to Cairo after the outbreak of the Second World War. Leaving her infant son with her parents in Dublin, she followed her husband to Cairo, where she became friends with Freya Stark and Jacqueline Lampson, and worked in Intelligence with the Brotherhood of Freedom.

She returned to Ireland in 1942, where she gave birth to their second son, Malise. Her husband, by then ranked Temporary Major and serving with the newly created SAS, died in an Italian hospital in north Africa on 24 December 1942, from wounds sustained in a raid against a fuel dump near Tripoli.

Her father-in-law, the 1st Baron Gowrie, as he was styled at the time of her wedding, served as Governor-General of Australia from 1936 to 1945. He was created Baron Gowrie in December 1935, and then Earl of Gowrie in January 1945. His widowed daughter-in-law was styled as Viscountess Ruthven of Canberra from 1945 to 1952. She lived with her father-in-law at Windsor Castle, where he was Deputy Governor, and was an Extra Woman of the Bedchamber to Queen Elizabeth from 1948 to 1951.

She met Major Derek Cooper in 1949. He had served with the Second Household Combined Regiment in Europe during the Second World War, and then with the Life Guards in Palestine, where he won the Military Cross and developed strong feelings for the plight of the Palestinian Arabs.

The couple fell in love, but he was married to another person. He petitioned for divorce, but Princess Alice disapproved of her proposed marriage to a divorcee, and the Earl of Athlone, Princess Alice's husband, was colonel of Cooper's regiment. Major Cooper resigned his commission, and his prospective new wife left Windsor. They married on 30 July 1952.

The Coopers moved to Dunlewey, a village in the district of Gweedore (Gaoth Dobhair) in County Donegal in the west of Ulster, living there until 1974. Both enjoyed skiing, and the County Donegal "season" centred on Glenveagh Castle, the summer residence of American art collector Henry McIlhenny, and Derek Hill. The Coopers later lived in Belgravia, but moved to Wiltshire in later life.

Cooper's elder son succeeded her father-in-law as the 2nd Earl of Gowrie in May 1955, and was later a minister in Margaret Thatcher's Conservative government. Her younger son, Malise Ruthven, is an author. She wrote a memoir, A Cloud of Forgetting, in 1993.

Her granddaughter, Chloe Ruthvens filmed and released a personal documentary The Do-Gooders in 2012 where she revisited her grandmother's humanitarian work in Palestine & Jordan.

== Humanitarian work ==
The Coopers took up charitable activities. They gave aid to refugees who had escaped across the Danube from Hungary during the 1956 revolution, joining a Save the Children relief team at Andau in Austria.

They spent over a year in northern Jordan in 1960–1961, assisting Palestinian refugees in camps near Irbid. They joined a Save the Children relief effort again following the 1962 Buin Zahra earthquake on 1 September which killed around 12,000 people and rendered 22,000 homeless.

In the 1970s and 1980s, they repeatedly travelled to the Middle East to work in Palestinian refugee camps. They conducted a survey of the conditions of Palestine refugees for the International Committee for Palestine Human Rights in 1975. The Coopers worked for Oxfam in Beirut through the summer of 1982, while the city was besieged by Israeli troops. They established the charity Medical Aid for Palestinians in 1984.

== Death ==
Cooper died in Amesbury, Wiltshire, aged 95, on 13 July 2006. She was survived by her second husband, who died on 19 May 2007, and their children.

== Sources ==
- Obituary, The Daily Telegraph, 15 July 2006.
