= Derek Cooper =

British Army officer (1912–2007)

Major George Derek Cooper OBE MC (28 May 1912 – 19 May 2007) was a British Army officer, campaigner for refugees, and supporter of the Palestinian people.

== Early life and career ==
Cooper was born in Bromley in Kent. He was the third of four children of Captain George Stanley Cooper and his wife, Clara Tilling. The family were comfortably wealthy – the Coopers family were printers, and the Tillings owned a substantial omnibus company. His father was killed in Jhansi in India in 1915, while serving with the Royal West Kent Regiment.

He was educated at Kent House School in Eastbourne and then Eastbourne College. His mother married one of his father's fellow officers from India, Major George Dominic Heyland. The family moved to his estate in County Londonderry.

Cooper failed an eyesight test and so was unable to join the Royal Navy as he wished. Instead, he became an apprentice civil engineer in 1930, working in Greenwich for the Tilbury Contracting and Dredging Company. He was sent to Palestine in 1932, where a new harbour was being built at Haifa. He became a Special Constable in the Palestine Police, but returned to Ireland when the project was finished in 1934. His stepfather had died, and he ran the estate at Ballintemple.

He married Pamela Armstrong-Lushington-Tulloch in 1937. They had one daughter, Jennifer-June (born 1939), and one son, Michael (born 1944). His daughter married Jeremy Browne (later 11th Marquess of Sligo).

== Army career ==
Cooper joined the Irish Guards as a reservist in October 1936. He was mobilised on 2 September 1939, and worked on the project to build field defences against the expected Nazi invasion in 1940. Having volunteered to join the Second Household Cavalry Regiment, he landed in Normandy on 13 July 1944, serving in France, Belgium, and at the battle for Nijmegen bridge on the road to Arnhem. He remained in Europe until 1946, when he was posted to Egypt with the Life Guards.

He was transferred to Palestine in 1947. He was awarded the Military Cross in 1948 for his service defending the Arab population in Jaffa from the advancing Yishuv forces, in the weeks after the Deir Yassin massacre. Most of the Arabs in Jaffa left with the British forces when they withdrew on 10 May 1948. He returned with his regiment to Germany, where he served as second-in-command.

He met Pamela, Viscountess Ruthven of Canberra, widow of Major The Hon. Patrick Hore-Ruthven, in 1949. She retained the noted beauty of her youth, and he sported a cavalry officer's moustache. The couple fell in love, and he petitioned his first wife for divorce. Princess Alice disapproved of the proposed marriage, and the Earl of Athlone, Princess Alice's husband, was colonel of Cooper's regiment. Major Cooper was divorced in 1951, and resigned his commission. His prospective new wife left Windsor, and they married on 30 July 1952. He gained two stepsons, Grey (later 2nd Earl of Gowrie) and Malise.

== Humanitarian relief ==
The Coopers and their family moved to Dunlewey in County Donegal, living there until 1974. Both enjoyed the Irish countryside, and the Donegal "season" centred on Glenveagh Castle, the summer residence of American art collector Henry McIlhenny, and his friend Derek Hill. They later had a house in Belgravia, but moved to Tisbury in Wiltshire in later life.

The Coopers took up humanitarian relief activities. They gave aid to refugees who had escaped across the Danube from Hungary during the 1956 revolution, joining a Save the Children Fund relief team at Andau in Austria. They spent over a year in northern Jordan in 1960–1, assisting Palestinian refugees in camps near Irbid. King Hussein of Jordan awarded Cooper the Istiqlal Medal for his work.

The Coopers joined a Save the Children relief effort again in 1962, following the Buin Zahra earthquake on 1 September which killed around 12,000 people and rendered 22,000 homeless. Following the Six-Day War, Cooper coordinated the relief efforts of the British Aid to Jordan Fund in Amman, giving aid to Palestinian refugees. In the 1970s and 1980s, they repeatedly travelled to the Middle East to work in Palestinian refugee camps. He was awarded the OBE in 1969 for his work in the occupied territories. They conducted a survey of the conditions of Palestine refugees for Oxfam in 1973-5 and the International Committee for Palestine Human Rights in 1975–6. The Coopers worked for Oxfam in Beirut through the summer of 1982, while the city was besieged by Israeli troops. They established the charity Medical Aid for Palestinians in 1984.

== Later life ==
Cooper published his diary from the Second World War in 1997 under the title Dangerous Liaison. A biography by John Baynes, For Love of Justice: the life of a quixotic soldier was published the same year.

His second wife died in Amesbury in Wiltshire on 13 July 2006. Major Cooper died in the same place less than a year later, shortly before his 95th birthday. He was survived by his son and daughter, and two step sons.
