= Lord Gowrie =

Lord Gowrie may refer to:

- Grey Ruthven, 2nd Earl of Gowrie (1939-2021), British politician
- Alexander Hore-Ruthven, 1st Earl of Gowrie (1872–1955), British soldier, longest-serving Governor-General of Australia
- John Ruthven, 3rd Earl of Gowrie (c. 1570–1600), Scottish nobleman
- James Ruthven, 2nd Earl of Gowrie (1575–1588), Scottish nobleman, Earl of Gowrie
- William Ruthven, 1st Earl of Gowrie (c. 1540–1584), Scottish nobleman

== See also ==
- Earl of Gowrie
