= Stephen Cutts =

- Born: April 1964 (age 62)
- Education: Keele University; INSEAD
- Employers: Export Credits Guarantee Department (1994-1996); OECD (1996-2007); Commonwealth Secretariat (2008-2013); United Nations (2013-2017); Medical Aid for Palestinians (since 2024)

CEO of Medical Aid for Palestinians
- Incumbent
- Assumed office 1 October 2025
- Preceded by: Tim Holmes
- Interim
- In office 9 September 2024 – 31 August 2025
- Preceded by: Melanie Ward
- Succeeded by: Tim Holmes

Stephen John Cutts, also known as Steve Cutts (born April 1964), is a British former civil servant turned executive leader in the non-governmental, charitable, and humanitarian sector. He has been the CEO of the charity Medical Aid for Palestinians since 1 October 2025, having previously served as Interim CEO from 9 September 2024 to 31 August 2025.

== Education ==
Cutts attended Keele University as a mature student and graduated with Double first-class honours in American Studies and English Literature. He also earned an Executive MBA from INSEAD.

== Career ==
Cutts had worked as an insurance underwriter and brokee in the City of London before joining the Civil Service's Export Credits Guarantee Department. In 1996, he started working at the Organisation for Economic Co-operation and Development (OECD), holding various senior positions, including as Deputy Head of the Export Credits Division, Deputy Secretary-General (with responsibility over the Development Assistance Committee), Chief of Staff, and chief adviser to the Secretary-General at the time, Don Johnston.

Cutts left the OECD in 2007 and after a brief stint as Executive Director of the Africa Programme at INSEAD, joined the Commonwealth Secretariat in London in 2008. He served firstly as Director of Strategic Planning and Evaluation at the Commonwealth Secretariat, and then as Commonwealth Assistant Secretary-General for Corporate Affairs. In this position, he was in charge of the administration, finance, strategic planning and human resources matters. In 2009, he was involved in the establishment of the Commonwealth Eminent Persons Group (EPG). Michael Kirby, a member of the EPG at the time described Cutts as one of the "most impressive" officials at the secretariat, remarking that he was "more energetic, more direct, plain-speaking, more willing to look at innovations".

In 2013, Cutts joined the United Nations as Assistant Secretary-General for the Office of Central Support Services in the Department of Management. He was appointed to this position by United Nations Secretary-General Ban Ki-moon on 3 April 2013. In 2017, he became the CEO of Reach to Teach, an international charity whose mission is to improve the quality of primary education in developing countries. He held this position until 2020.

Cutts went on to work as chair of the United Nations Population Fund's Oversight Advisory Committee and as a partner of Independent Economics before being appointed as interim CEO of Medical Aid for Palestinians in September 2024. The charity's previous CEO Melanie Ward had stepped down from the role following her election as Member of Parliament for Cowdenbeath and Kirkcaldy. Cutts's position at Medical Aid for Palestinians was made permanent in October 2025. As part of his role, Cutts visited the charity's operations in the West Bank in 2024 and Lebanon in 2025. In April 2025, he was among the CEOs of aid charities who co-signed an open letter started by the CEO of Save the Children written in response to the killings of aid workers during the Gaza genocide since 2023. The letter called for a guarantee on the safety of humanitarian aid workers, and for the "safe, unfettered access of aid into and across Gaza through all entry points", opposing further restrictions on the delivery of aids into Gaza.

=== Official Development Assistance (ODA) reform ===
Cutts first became involved in ODA accounting in 2002, during his time at the OECD. He has since become a campaigner and independent researcher in this field, advocating for a fairer system of recording ODA without detriment on developing countries in receipt of ODA. He publishes writings on this area on his personal website, odareform.org. Cutts has also contributed articles about ODA reform to publications such as The Guardian, Development Today, the Financial Times, as well as the academic journal The Round Table.

== Honours ==
Cutts received an honorary Doctor of the University award from Keele University, his alma mater, in 2016.

== Personal life ==
As of 2022, Cutts lived between Sussex in the UK and New York in the US.

== Publications ==
- Cutts, Steve (2009). "Respect and understanding: taking the civil path to peace". Commonwealth Ministers Reference Book 2009 (PDF). London: Commonwealth Secretariat. pp. 60–61. ISBN 978-0-9554408-9-2.
- ————— (2015-07-04). "The Commonwealth and Europe". The Round Table. 104 (4): 489–492. doi:10.1080/00358533.2015.1063843. ISSN 0035-8533.
- ————— (2022-01-02). "Climate change: the 'COP-out' in Glasgow". The Round Table. 111 (1): 127–128. doi:10.1080/00358533.2022.2031740. ISSN 0035-8533.
- ————— (2022-02-18), Giving Credit Where Credit’s Due: The Need to Address Flaws in the Calculation of ODA in Loans (PDF), Papers submitted to the Chair of the OECD Development Assistance Committee
- ————— (2022-03-04). "The Commonwealth Eminent Persons Group: some personal reflections". The Round Table. 111 (2): 227–247. doi:10.1080/00358533.2022.2058282. ISSN 0035-8533.
- —————; with Kowalzig, Jan; Cherry-Virdee, Tallulah; Sørensen, Rasmus Bo (June 2024), Climate Finance Short-Changed 2024 update: estimating the real value of the $100 billion commitment for 2021-22, Climate Specific Net Assisistance Estimate Methodology Note, Oxfam
- ————— (2025-08-18). "How the OECD/DAC donor club ignored the NIEO … and the consequences". Development in Practice. 35 (6): 947–952. doi:10.1080/09614524.2025.2511967. ISSN 0961-4524.

Diplomatic posts
Preceded by Warren Sach	United Nations's Assistant Secretary-General for Central Support Services; 2013-2017	Succeeded by Christian Saunders
Civic offices
Preceded by Melanie Ward	CEO of Medical Aid for Palestinians; 2024-present	Succeeded by incumbent
