= From Beirut to Jerusalem: A Woman Surgeon with the Palestinians =

Book by Swee Chai Ang

- Author: Swee Chai Ang
- Language: English
- Genre: Non-fiction
- Publisher: Grafton House
- Publication date: January 1, 1989
- Publication place: United Kingdom

From Beirut to Jerusalem: A Woman Surgeon with the Palestinians is a book by Swee Chai Ang, an orthopaedic surgeon who worked with civilians during the Lebanese Civil War. The book details her eye-witness account of the Sabra and Shatila massacre. Ang, a graduate of the Royal Victoria Infirmary in Britain, testified before the Kahan Commission. The commission was responsible for investigating the nature of the Israeli involvement in the massacre of perhaps 800 to 1000 Palestinians. Ang established a British charity following her first hand account of the massacres known as the Medical Aid for Palestinians (MAP) which she discusses in her work. The book was first published January 1, 1989. A 25th anniversary edition was published in 2007 with additional content, and a 40th anniversary edition was later published as well.

== Contents ==
• Part 1: Journey to Beirut

• Part 2: The Sabra-Shatila Massacre

• Part 3: From Jerusalem to Britain

• Part 4: Return to Beirut

• Part 5: From Beirut to Jerusalem
