= Unholy Kingdom: Religion, Corruption and Violence in Saudi Arabia =

Unholy Kingdom: Religion, Corruption and Violence in Saudi Arabia is a 2025 book on Saudi Arabia by Malise Ruthven. It was published by Verso Books in 2025.

== Reception ==
It was chosen by Jonathan Benthall as one of his 'Books of the Year' in the Times Literary Supplement. He described it as an "unblushing polemic" which treats the murder of Jamal Khashoggi as "representative of the Saudi kingdom's recent policies rather than, as their defenders claim, a regrettable aberration". Colin Thubron felt the book was a "shocking exposé of ruthlessness and folly" with the book offering a "timely study of Saudi Arabia in its historical context and biting insight into its politics".

In The Times Justin Marozzi wrote that Ruthven "pulls no punches in an analysis that is relentless, dispassionate and excoriating" and that the book was "an eye-popping and unsettling read". He had particular praise for Ruthven's "meticulous" tracing of the "vast and unruly financial and cultural networks in which international terrorist groups, directly and indirectly, are linked with Saudi dollars and wider patronage". Marozzi also chose Unholy Kingdom as one of his 'Books of the Year' for The Spectator describing it as a "masterful and disturbing dissection of the kingdom".

In The Daily Telegraph Rory McCarthy described the book as a "telling account relies heavily on the work of other scholars to paint a brutish picture of the regime" but was critical of Ruthven's belief that sport might provide a "substitute for religious fervour" as Saudi investment in sport is "intended to buy international influence, ease investor concerns, and, perhaps, generate a greater sense of national identity at home".

It was also reviewed by Jason Burke in the Literary Review and by Thomas Small in The Times Literary Supplement.
