= Patrick Hore-Ruthven =

British soldier and poet

The Hon. Alexander Hardinge Patrick Hore-Ruthven (30 August 1913 – 24 December 1942) was a British soldier and poet. He was born in Quetta, British India (present-day Pakistan), the sole surviving child of Alexander Hore-Ruthven and Zara Eileen Pollok.

== Personal life ==
Hore-Ruthven studied at Cambridge University in 1931 and met society beauty Pamela Fletcher while he was temporarily rusticated from Cambridge in 1932 for having bitten a policeman's nose.

After graduating in 1933, he joined the Rifle Brigade, his grandfather's old regiment, and served in Malta for three years. Commissioned a second lieutenant in the Territorial Army on 2 July 1933, he received a regular commission on 1 September 1934 (seniority 31 August 1933). He was promoted to lieutenant on 31 August 1936.

His father, Alexander Hore-Ruthven, was made Baron Gowrie in 1935 and 1st Earl of Gowrie in 1945. Hore-Ruthven married Pamela Fletcher on 4 January 1939 at Westminster Abbey, after their marriage was initially delayed due to a mutual lack of money. Her father, the Reverend Arthur Henry Fletcher officiated. Their first son, Grey, was born on 26 November 1939. After Hore-Ruthven's death, his widow was styled Viscountess Ruthven of Canberra. She remarried in 1949, to Major Derek Cooper.

Hore-Ruthven's father Alexander Hore-Ruthven, 1st Earl of Gowrie died in May 1955, whereupon his elder son Grey succeeded as the 2nd Earl of Gowrie.

== World War II ==
On the outbreak of the Second World War in 1939, Hore-Ruthven was posted to Cairo. Pamela left their baby with her parents in Dublin and accompanied Hore-Ruthven to Cairo. There, she became friends with Freya Stark and Jacqueline Lampson. She also worked in Intelligence with the anti-Nazi Arab Brotherhood of Freedom, while Hore-Ruthven joined the newly formed SAS. He was promoted to captain on 31 August 1941.

Pamela returned to Ireland in 1942 to give birth to their second son, Malise, on 14 May 1942. Hore-Ruthven was Temporary Major when he died in Misurata Italian Hospital in Libya from wounds he received in a raid on a fuel dump near Tripoli. He died on 24 December 1942, and was buried in the war cemetery in Tripoli. A memorial fountain was constructed at Government House in Canberra.

== Poetry ==
Hore-Ruthven wrote several war poems that were published in Australian and English newspapers. A collection of his poems was published posthumously in Australia in 1943 under the title The Happy Warrior, with a preface written by his mother Lady Gowrie. It was subsequently republished in London in 1944 under the title Desert Warrior: Poems. His collected letters were published in London in 1950 under the title Joy of Youth.

== Sources ==
- Papers of Lord Gowrie, relating to the death of Patrick Hore-Ruthven in 1942, nla.gov.au; accessed 11 June 2017.
