= Patrick Grant (rosarian) =

Australian rose breeder

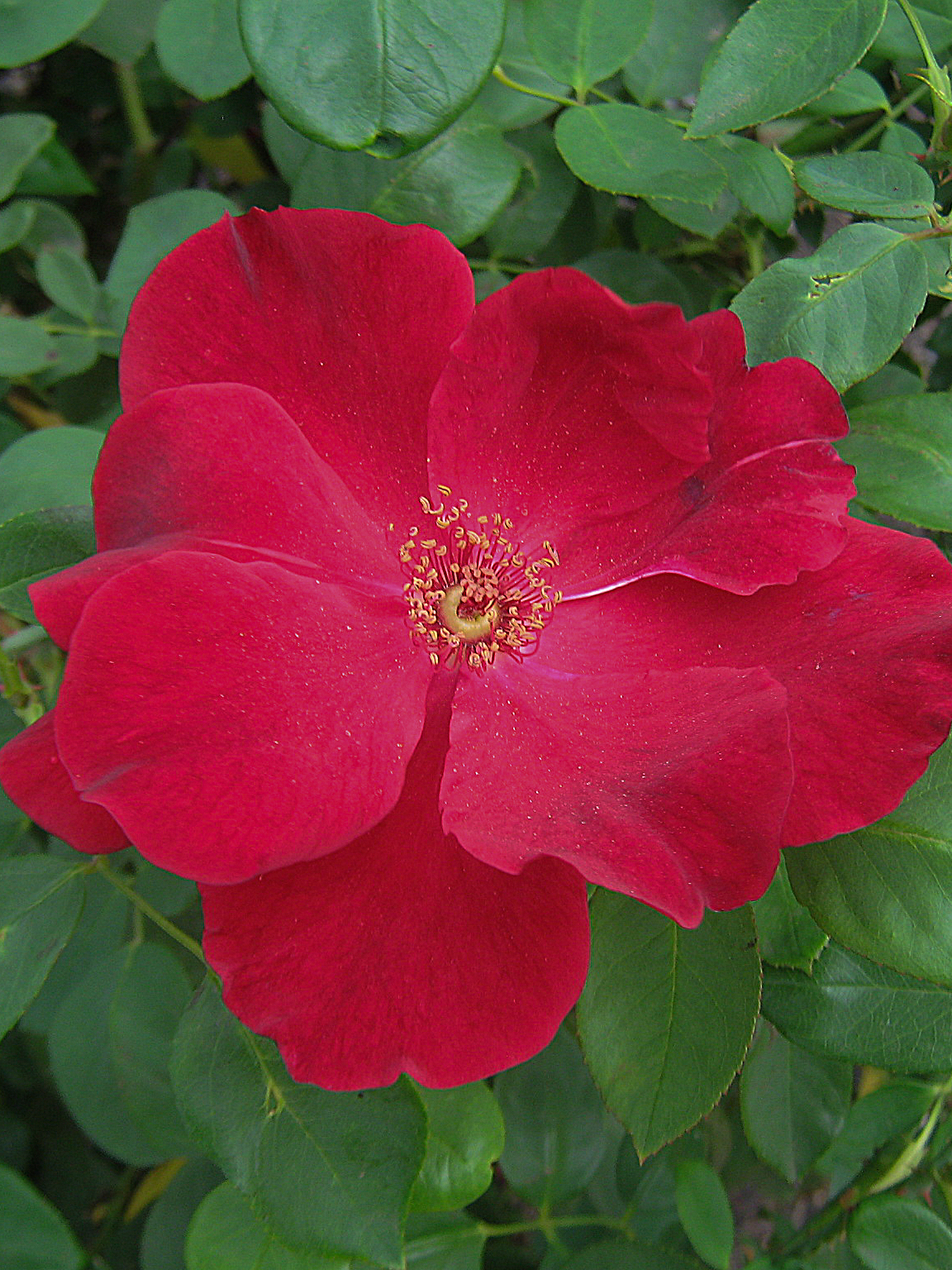
'Midnight Sun', Grant 1921, a deep red, black-tinged, scented hybrid tea. In the Nieuwesteeg Heritage Rose Garden at Bacchus Marsh, Victoria.

Patrick Grant (1860 – 28 September 1945) was a Scottish-born Australian rose breeder. Two of his roses were world-famous at his death, though to some extent superseded since.

== Life ==
Patrick Grant was born in Aberdeen, Scotland in 1860. He was the son of a stonemason and trained as a wheelwright. He migrated to New South Wales in 1885 and worked for 20 years as a building contractor. As a dairy farmer on virgin land at Nambucca River, Macksville on the north coast of New South Wales he developed a famous herd of Ayreshires. He and his wife Beatrice had eight children, six of whom worked as adults on their 400-acre farm. He thus appears as a successful small landholder, quite different from the members of the landed elite like Alister Clark and Olive Fitzhardinge who were the best known rose breeders of the time.

At the end of the nineteenth century, he sat on the North Sydney council. He was president of the Primary Producers Union 1904–1934. He was president of the National Rose Society of NSW 1929–1931 and stayed on the committee till 1943. The Society's championship cup for a rose exhibit is called the Patrick Grant Cup.

He also had a Sydney North Shore address at 26 Clanwilliam Street, Chatswood from 1927 at least, perhaps with the third of an acre behind the house now devoted to tennis courts. Alister Clark visited his and other Sydney rose breeders' gardens in 1928, so Grant must have had roses growing there. Grant was 61 when his first rose was released, so it is possible all three roses he released were bred in retirement at Chatswood.

== Roses ==
The readers' survey by the Melbourne Argus for 1937 showed Grant's 'Golden Dawn' to be in the most popular ten garden roses. When he died on 28 September 1945 the Sydney Morning Herald said he had been one of the two leading rose breeders in Australia. It particularly praised Mr. Grant's 'Golden Dawn' as possibly the finest of all yellow roses, and his 'Salmon Spray' as in world class among "cluster roses."

The fifth edition of A.S. Thomas's Better Roses of 1969 gives his list of the 80 finest roses bred by then in Australia or New Zealand. Both 'Golden Dawn' and 'Salmon Spray' are on it.

'Golden Dawn' (released 1929) is still on sale in Australia, Europe and North America. It is a pale yellow hybrid tea similar to 'Peace', which supplanted it on nursery lists but which is not entirely a better rose. 'Salmon Spray' (1923) seems only to be available in North America. 'Salmon Spray' is a salmon pink floribunda. 'Midnight Sun' (1921), a red–black hybrid tea, can be seen in the Nieuwesteeg Heritage Rose Garden at Bacchus Marsh in Victoria.
