= Olive Fitzhardinge =

Australian rose breeder

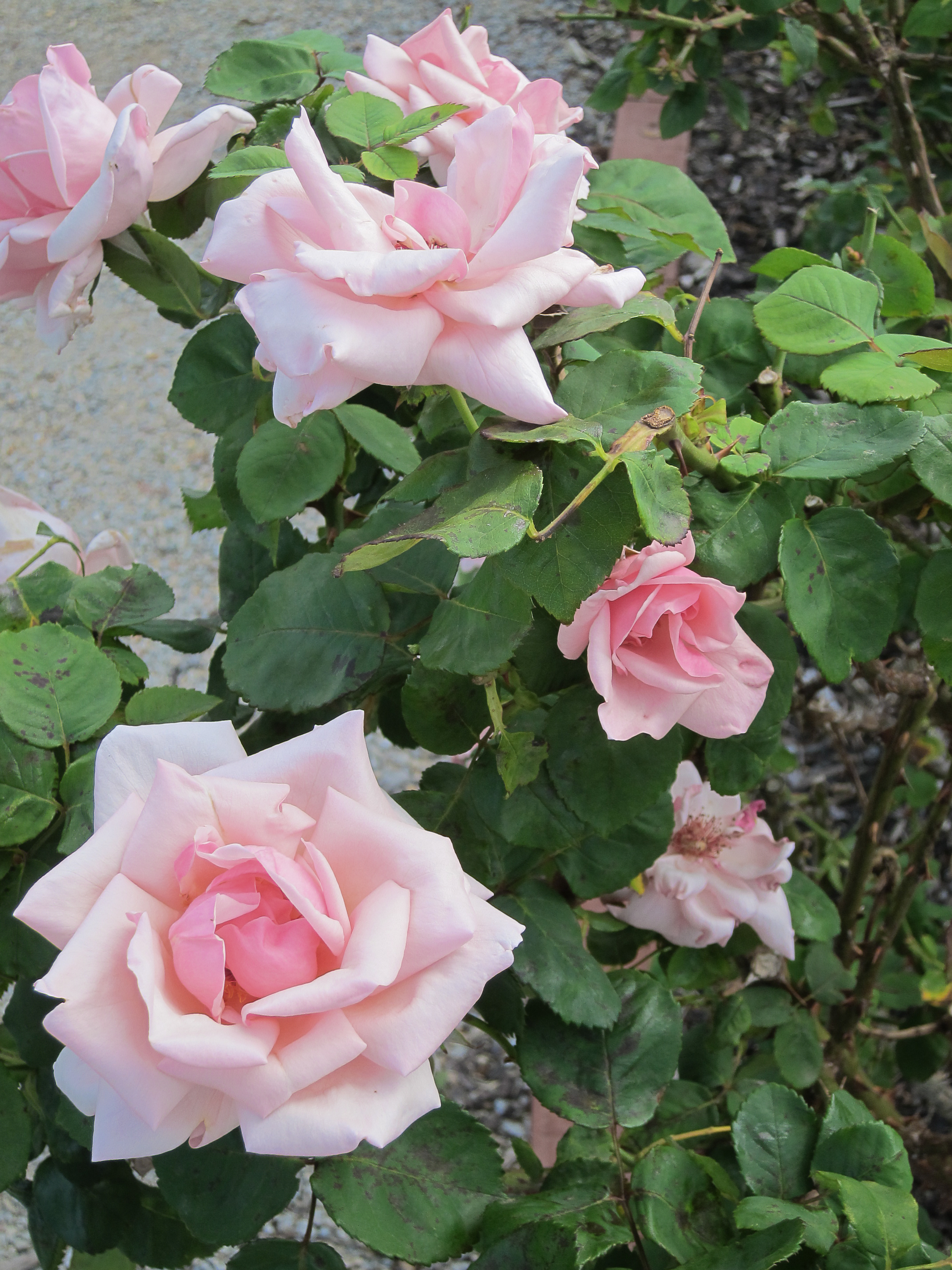
'Warrawee' 1932, a pink hybrid tea with good scent, flowering all season. Photographed in autumn at the State Rose Garden, Werribee Park, Victoria.

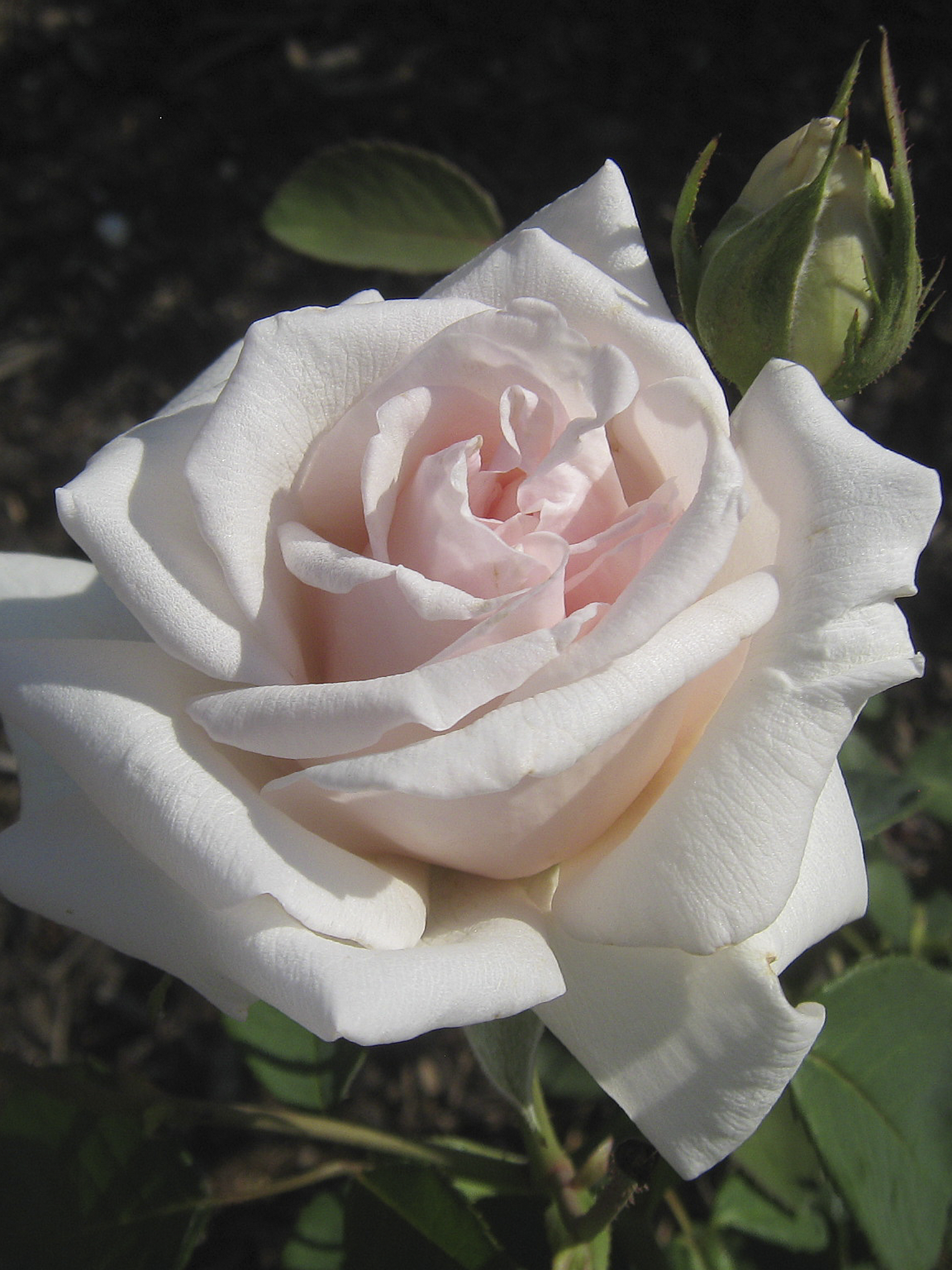
'Lady Edgeworth David' 1939, Fitzhardinge's palest pink hybrid tea named after her friend and Warrawee neighbour. Photographed at Maddingley Park, Victoria.

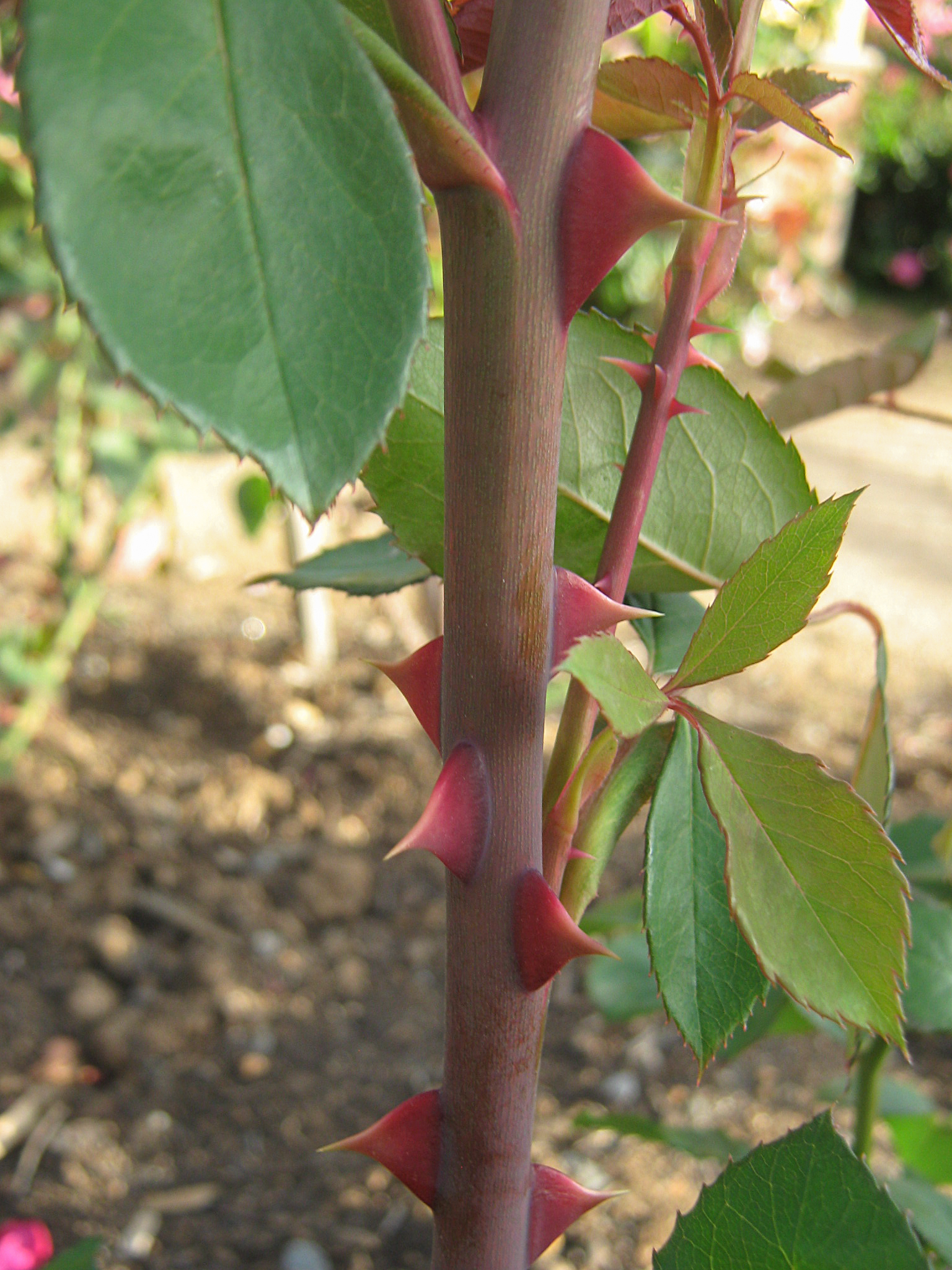
Elegant detail: thorns and leaves of 'Lady Edgeworth David'.

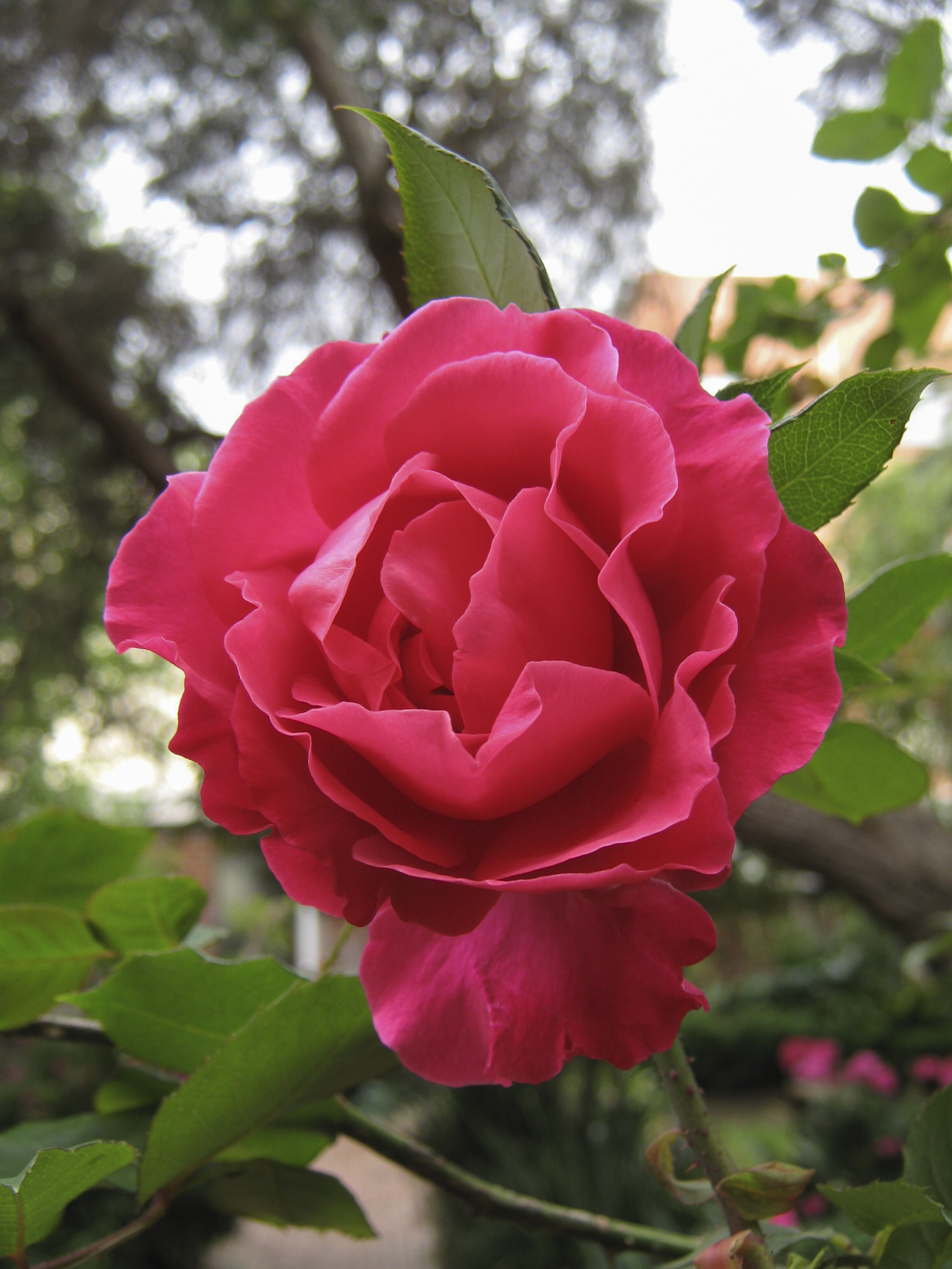
'Prudence' 1938. Ever-flowering climber named after Fitzhardinge's second daughter. Damask scent.

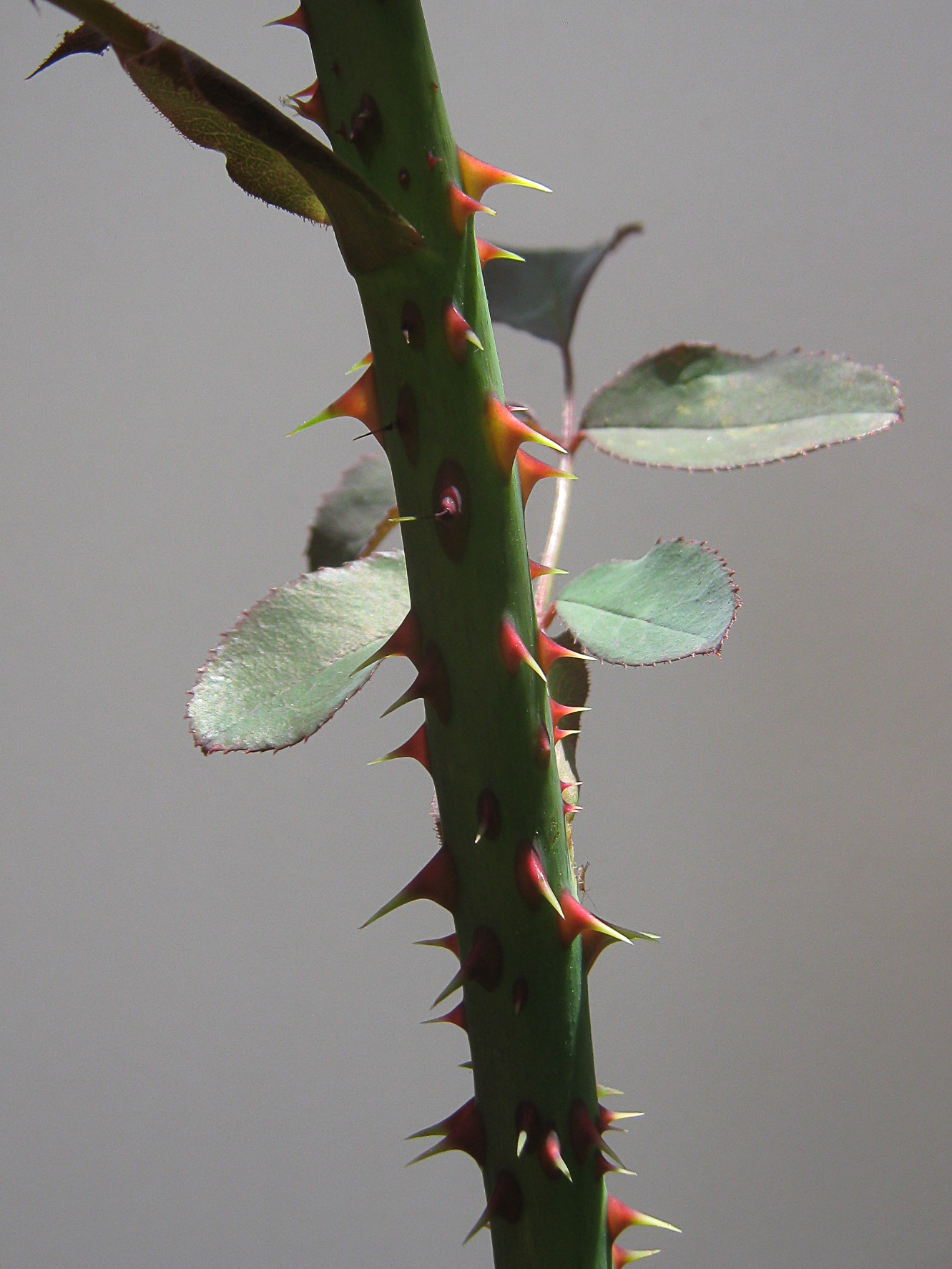
Elegant detail: thorns and leaves of 'Prudence', 1938.

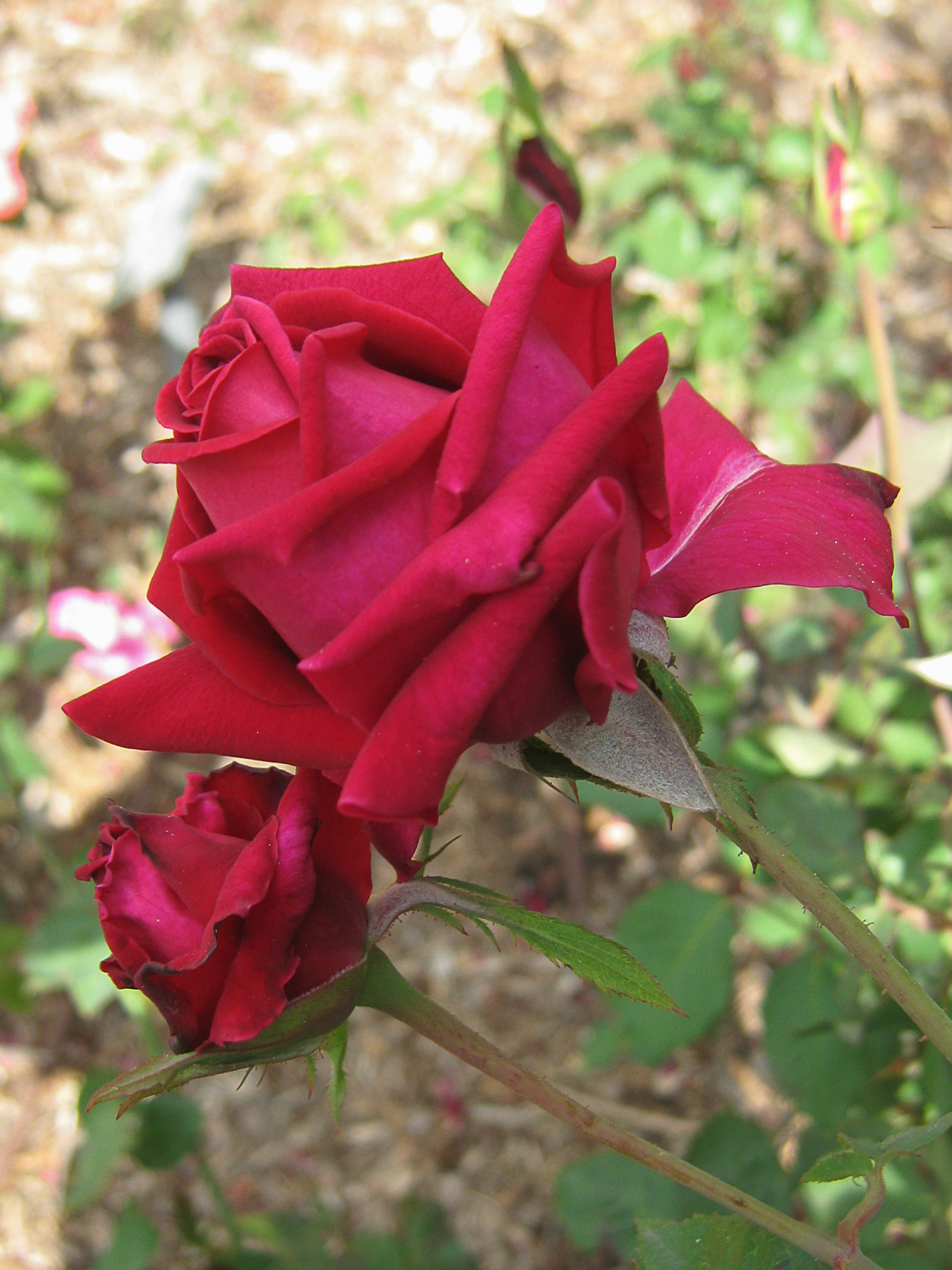
'Lubra' 1938; classic hybrid tea shape, red-black on the inside, crimson reverse, superb scent: the height of 1930s chic. In the Centenary Rose Garden at Morwell, Victoria.

Olive Fitzhardinge (1881–1956) was an Australian rose breeder, the first to patent her work. Her four surviving roses are held in Australian collections. Her roses were well received in the 1930s but after the Second World War favoured styles of roses changed significantly.

== Life ==
Olive Rose McMaster was born in 1881 at Warialda, northern New South Wales. She was brought up in the country at Moree. She was the elder daughter of Colin James McMaster (1853–1930) and Sarah Ross (1855–1927). Her father was for twenty years Chief Commissioner and chairman of the Western Lands Board, which administered land leases in the whole western third of NSW.

Olive was educated by a governess at home and boarded 1897–1898 at Presbyterian Ladies' College, Croydon.

She and her sister Dorothy Jean (1884–1966), later Mrs C.W.D. Conacher of Crona, Warrawee, were influenced by the Arts and Crafts movement, and through it Victorian Medievalism. They collected medieval objects, dress fabrics and tapestry. They cultivated quiet Country Life interiors furnished with old things and lit with tallow candles in medieval candlesticks. Exteriors would show the luxuriant informality of Gertrude Jekyll's Roses for English Gardens. Later Olive was to breed roses to look well in candlelight. Her second daughter was married in a "mediaeval gown".

It lent depth to Olive's interest that she married into a pre-Conquest, west of England family ennobled by Henry II in the twelfth century. In 1909 she married Dr Hardinge Clarence Fitzhardinge (1878–1958), a Macquarie Street dental surgeon. He was the son of M.A.H. Fitzhardinge, a prominent Sydney solicitor from the second generation of the well-known NSW legal family founded in the 1840s by W.G.A. Fitzhardinge.

Hardinge and Olive lived at Cremorne Point for some years but in 1917 bought 1.5 acres (0.61 ha) with a northerly aspect and good volcanic soil at Warrawee 21 km northwest of Sydney. As all North Shore suburbs with aboriginal names, Warrawee was the name of a railway station which became attached to the surrounding suburb. Warrawee had developed in the 1900s as an exclusive residential district with no shops, offices, post office, public school, churches or through roads. All the blocks were kept to between one and four acres and the form of houses tightly controlled. The Fitzhardinges had Bridge End at No. 1 Warrawee Avenue, where they built a spreading single-storey house and established "quite a famous garden". As well-to-do citizens of the Empire they followed London manners and taste: in a world of "lounge" rooms they kept to a drawing-room.

The Fitzhardinges had daughters Jean Mary Hardinge Dean (1910–2009) and Olive Prudence Bryant (1912–2001) and sons Colin Hardinge Fitzhardinge (1914–1998) and Brian Forbes Fitzhardinge, who died at fourteen in 1932.

Olive Fitzhardinge began to breed roses at Bridge End about 1920. Because she was wealthy and related to prominent people in the history of New South Wales, her activities as a rose breeder were unusually well reported. In fact society and rose-breeding themes were closely intertwined. The Sydney Morning Herald on 16 May 1934 reported the wedding of the Fitzhardinges' daughter. Five of Mrs Fitzhardinge's 12 roses were named after those present, six if one includes 'Warrawee'.

A gleaming golden girdle added a note of colour to the mediaeval gown of white velvet worn by Miss Prudence Hardinge Fitzhardinge ['Prudence'] for her wedding last night to Mr. Bowen Bartlett Bryant, which took place at St. John's Church, Wahroonga … the two bridesmaids, the Misses Jean Fitzhardinge ['Plain Jane'], sister of the bride, and Peggy Prell (Goulburn) … At Bridge End, Warrawee … a marquee was erected on the lawn for the wedding breakfast … Mrs. Fitzhardinge received her guests wearing a gown of silver grey lace and a black velvet toque, and carrying a posy of shaded berries … Among the guests were … Mr. and Mrs. L. Bice (Inverell) ['Kitty Bice'], Lady David ['Lady Edgeworth David'] … Mr. and Mrs. C. E. Prell (Goulburn) ['Mrs C.E. Prell'] …

Joseph Beresford Grant, who had used his money to guarantee the exclusiveness of Warrawee, was also a guest.

Mrs Fitzhardinge planted many trees in public spaces, including the long avenue of the Pymble Ladies College (where her daughters were pupils) and many of the majestic tree groupings at the Avondale Golf Club (where she was a member).

In 1937 Dr Fitzhardinge, Olive and their surviving son moved to Wongalong, a sheep and cattle property at Mandurama (pr. ManDOOrama) on the Central Tablelands of NSW. Despite her intentions, Mrs Fitzhardinge bred no more roses, though she continued to grow them in "drought, many high winds, and mineralised water." She did experiment with breeding improved geraniums. She died in 1956. Her son Colin, married to the writer Joan Phipson, inherited Wongalong and her rose 'Warrawee' was still growing there in 1980.

== Rose breeding ==
Fitzhardinge's roses were hybrid teas. She registered twelve between 1932 and 1939. Except for 'Beatrice Berkeley' and 'Plain Jane' they were released for sale through Hazlewood Brothers' nursery. She was a friend of the Hazlewoods and of the rose breeders Alister Clark and George Knight. She told the Sydney Morning Herald in 1931 she had bred 12 satisfactory roses in ten years, so it is possible that her rose breeding (as opposed to testing and registration) had been completed between 1921 and 1930. Certainly all the plant material she bred from had been released by 1921 (see the list of her rose parents below). She bred twenty thousand seedlings in ten years, ten times the average number bred by Frank Riethmuller in Turramurra after the Second World War. Olive Fitzhardinge described herself as an "amateur hybridiser" but behind a domestic facade she operated on a commercial scale. She knew people who ran big pasture and stock breeding businesses in country NSW and the Northern Territory.

Australia had no Plant Breeder's Rights Act at that time. The only way to secure rights was to take out an overseas patent. Fitzhardinge is the only Australian breeder before the 1960s known to have done so, in her case an American patent on 'Warrawee.' To that extent she had commercial ambitions for her work, unlike her friend Alister Clark or North Shore successor Frank Riethmuller.

'Warrawee' especially received enthusiastic press notices, emphasising the ladylike quality of the rose, said to be due to its being bred by a lady. At the same time the rose was seen as an Australian nationalist venture into world markets.

But the predicted commercial triumph of her roses did not occur, though 'Warrawee' was introduced in England and America in 1935. Her shrub roses had been modelled on 'Ophelia' as the ideal rose; after the war a shift in taste took place to roses modelled on 'Peace.' Her climbing roses were huge plants best suited to prewar gardens. Even to post-war enthusiasts Fitzhardinge's roses seemed under-bred. For instance, 'Sirius' 1939, a dark red climber, was criticised for lack of vigor by those who still grew it. Moreover, nearly all her roses have very double flowers which in humid climates can rot before opening.

Patrick Grant, a fellow member of the NSW Rose Society, had more success in between-wars overseas markets with his 'Salmon Spray' and 'Golden Dawn', a rose destined, like hers, to be outmoded by 'Peace'.

Ten years after her death, her roses had nearly been forgotten. The Australian registrar of roses and president of the National Rose Society of Victoria was A.S. Thomas. The 1967 edition of his Better Roses prints a list of eighty "highly prized cultivars" from Australia and New Zealand. Twenty of them are roses by Alister Clark. Seven are by Frank Riethmuller. Only 'Lubra' and 'Warrawee' are by Olive Fitzhardinge.

=== Rose names ===
- 'Beatrice Berkeley' had an unknown dedicatee. But the Fitzhardinges were interconnected with the Berkeley family and the Barons Berkeley from the twelfth century.
- 'Kitty Bice' was Catherine, Mrs Luke Bice, an Inverell friend of Olive Fitzhardinge.
- 'Warrawee' was the name of the sequestered suburb and society in which the Fitzhardinges lived.
- 'Captain Bligh' (later Admiral Bligh) was an early governor of New South Wales (1806–1808) after he became the object of mutiny on HMS Bounty in 1789.
- 'Lady Gowrie' (Zara Hore-Ruthven) was the wife of Lord Gowrie (later the Earl of Gowrie) who was in turn Governor of South Australia, Governor of New South Wales (1935–1936), and Governor-General of Australia. Convention required the Governor to be patron of the NSW Rose Society, and the Society to name a rose after his wife.
- 'Mrs C.E. Prell', born Caroline Ivy Chave, was the wife of Gundowringa grazier Charles Ernest Prell and president of the Goulburn CWA. Prell was a famous investor and ideas man for improving pastures and stock in dry country. There was a Prell Scheme for introducing young English migrants to the land. The Prells were friends of Olive's father, the Fitzhardinges and their daughter Prudence.
- 'Lubra' does not refer to any particular aboriginal maiden. The name alludes to its being a darker and more elegant descendant of Alister Clark's 'Black Boy.'
- 'Prudence' was Mrs Fitzhardinge's second daughter.
- 'Plain Jane' was probably her first daughter, Jean Mary.
- 'Governor Phillip' was Arthur Phillip, the first governor (1787–1792) of the colony of New South Wales.
- 'Sirius' was HMS Sirius (1786), flagship of the First Fleet sent to colonise New South Wales in 1787.
- 'Lady Edgeworth David' was Caroline Martha (Cara) Mallett (1856-1951), a prominent social campaigner, the wife of Sir Edgeworth David and a personal friend of the Fitzhardinges.

=== List of Fitzhardinge roses ===
Name	Date	Type	Colour	Petallage	Seed parent	Pollen parent	Extant
Beatrice Berkeley	1932	Hybrid tea shrub	Orange-salmon	unknown	Cupid (1914)	Padre (1920)	Lost
Kitty Bice	1932	Hybrid tea climber	Dark bright pink	Semi-double	Ophelia climbing (1920)	Lady Waterlow (1902)	Lost
Warrawee	1932	Hybrid tea shrub	Pink	30	Rev. F. Page-Roberts (1921)	Padre (1920)	Yes
Captain Bligh	1934	Hybrid tea shrub	Pink	Very double	Gustav Grünewald (1902)	Betty Uprichard (1920)	Lost
Lady Gowrie	1938	Hybrid tea climber	Yellow	unknown	Sunburst climbing (1914)	Rev. F. Page-Roberts (1921)	Lost
Lubra	1938	Hybrid tea shrub	Dark red	60	Ophelia (1912)	Black Boy (Clark) (1919)	Yes
Mrs C.E. Prell	1938	Hybrid tea shrub	Red blend	Double	Gustav Grünewald (1902)	Betty Uprichard (1920)	Lost
Plain Jane	1938	Hybrid tea shrub	unknown	unknown	unknown	unknown	Lost
Prudence	1938	Hybrid tea climber	Neyron pink	40–60	Warrawee (1932)	Souvenir de Claudius Pernet (1920)	Yes
Governor Phillip	1939	Hybrid tea climber	Ruby red	100	Ophelia seedling	Black Boy (1919)	Lost
Lady Edgeworth David	1939	Hybrid tea shrub	Malmaison pink	60	Seedling	Betty Uprichard (1920)	Yes
Sirius	1939	Hybrid tea climber	Cherry red	Very double	Seedling	Lubra (1938)	Lost

=== Where the roses can be seen ===
- The National Rose Collection created by David Ruston at Renmark in South Australia has 'Warrawee,' 'Lady Edgeworth David' and 'Lubra.'
- The Victoria State Rose Garden at Werribee Park has 'Warrawee', 'Lady Edgeworth David', 'Lubra' and 'Prudence'.
- The Nieuwesteeg Heritage Rose Garden at Maddingley Park, Bacchus Marsh, Victoria has 'Warrawee' and 'Lady Edgeworth David'.
- The Morwell Centenary Rose garden in Gippsland has 'Warrawee' and 'Lubra.'
- The Roseto Carla Fineschi near Arezzo, Italy has 'Warrawee.'
- The Roseraie de Val-du-Marne at l'Haÿ-les-Roses, 8 km south of Paris has 'Warrawee'.
- The Europas-Rosarium at Sangerhausen in north east Germany has 'Warrawee.'
- The National Plant Collections Register of significant Australian rose cultivars is held by John Nieuwesteeg at Yellingbo, Victoria. It contains 'Lady Edgeworth David', 'Prudence' and 'Warrawee' but access is by application only.

=== Articles written by Fitzhardinge ===
- Mrs O. R. Fitzthardinge, "Amateur hybridisation." Australian Rose Annual, 1932 p. 127.
- Mrs O. R. Fitzthardinge, Mandurama, "'New Garden—New Roses." Australian Rose Annual, 1941 p. 58.
