= Zara Hore-Ruthven, Countess of Gowrie =

British countess (1879–1965)

The Right Honourable The Countess of Gowrie
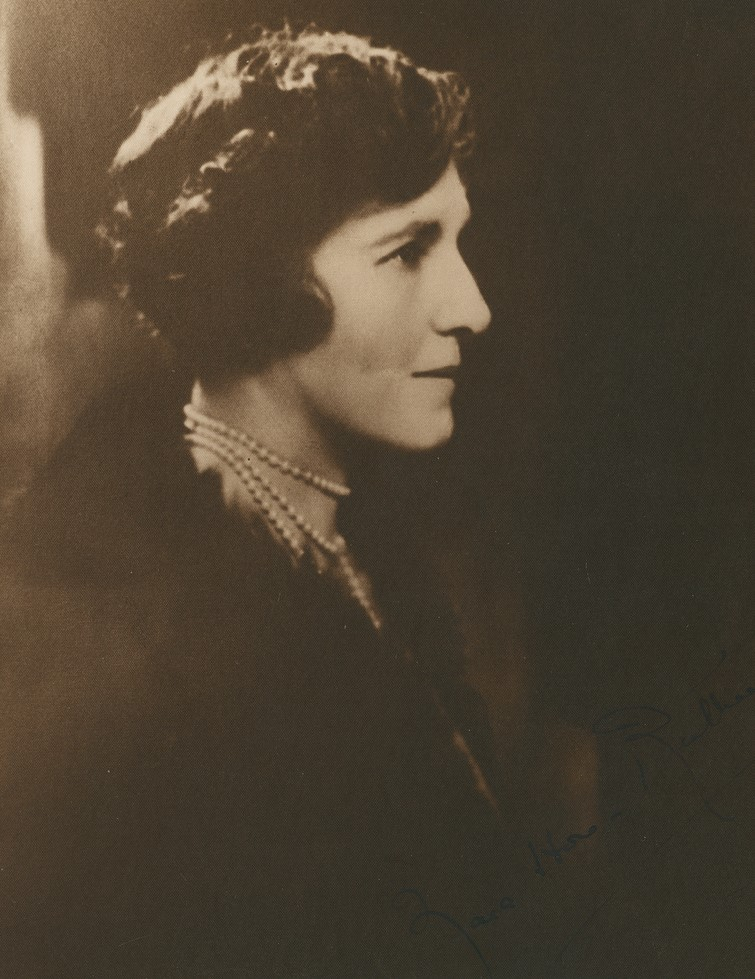

Spouse of the governor-general of Australia
- In office 23 January 1936 – 30 January 1945
- Monarchs: Edward VIII; George VI
- Governor General: Earl of Gowrie
- Preceded by: Daisy, Lady Isaacs
- Succeeded by: Duchess of Gloucester

Personal details
- Born: 20 January 1879 Near Ballinasloe, County Galway, Ireland
- Died: 19 July 1965 (aged 86)
- Spouse: Alexander Hore-Ruthven, 1st Earl of Gowrie (m. 1908; died 1955)
- Children: Patrick Hore-Ruthven; Alistair Malise Hore-Ruthven

Zara Hore-Ruthven, Countess of Gowrie (née Zara Eileen Pollok; 20 January 1879 – 19 July 1965) was the Anglo-Irish wife of the 1st Earl of Gowrie, Governor of South Australia 1928–34, Governor of New South Wales 1935–36 and the longest serving Governor-General of Australia 1936–44. She was renowned for her work in promoting the welfare of children in Australia, and the Lady Gowrie Child Centres were named in her honour.

== Biography ==
Zara Eileen Pollok was born near Ballinasloe, County Galway, Ireland in 1879, the daughter of John Pollok, DL, and his wife the Honourable Florence Madeline, née Bingham, daughter of the 4th Baron Clanmorris. She studied music in Vienna when she was young.

On 1 June 1908 at St George's, Hanover Square, she married Alexander Hore-Ruthven, over the objections of her family, who considered him "the impecunious son of an impoverished family, with indifferent prospects". The following month, they came to Australia, where he took up the post of military secretary to Lord Dudley, the Governor-General. He had previously served as aide-de-camp to Lord Dudley when he was Lord Lieutenant of Ireland. In 1928, he was appointed Governor of South Australia and was knighted, she becoming Lady Hore-Ruthven.

In January 1935 he became Governor of New South Wales, and in January 1936 Governor-General. He had earlier been elevated to the peerage as Baron Gowrie of Canberra and Dirleton, and she became Baroness Gowrie.

In the 1930s Lady Gowrie heard the budding opera singer Joan Hammond, and she fostered her career, including organising the costs of her travel to Europe to study music, and putting her in touch with the director of the Vienna Boys' Choir, then visiting Australia. Hammond called her "my fairy godmother", and her first real success came only after this assistance from Lady Gowrie.

== Lady Gowrie Child Centres ==
In around 1939, the Lady Gowrie Child Centres in the state capital cities were established by the Commonwealth Government to demonstrate exemplary benchmarks of quality in early childhood practice. This was followed by lobbying by Lady Gowrie and others for the establishment of centres across Australia to improve the health and wellbeing of Australian children, particularly disadvantaged children.

The first Lady Gowrie Child Centre was established at Battery Point in Hobart. There is also a Lady Gowrie Library and Resource Centre in Hobart, which contains a range of specialised early childhood publications to support early childhood professionals. The Lady Gowrie Child Centre in Melbourne is now known as "Gowrie Victoria". It supports the early childhood sector through education and care programs, demonstration services, nationally recognized training and professional learning, a professional bookshop, a library, and early childhood consultancy and advice. In Perth, Western Australia, a centre was established in about 1940 in Victoria Park, which is now supplanted by local council administrative offices. Gowrie NSW provides a range of childcare, family support, and professional development services and partners with universities and researchers to undertake and support research.

== Canberra Services Club ==
Lady Gowrie played an active role in the establishment of the Canberra Services Club, then known as the Canberra Services Welfare Association. The Association wanted to build a "rest hut" for use by members of the forces. She hosted a Garden Fair at Government House, Canberra, which raised a very considerable sum for those days of £3,500, and she also donated some of her personal belongings for a raffle. The Lady Gowrie Services Club was opened on 13 March 1941, and she was the inaugural president until the Gowries returned to the United Kingdom in 1944. In April 2009, the Lady Gowrie Hall at the Canberra Services Club was formally dedicated.

She also organised various other concerts and fairs at the Government House for the war effort. She made a radio broadcast to the women of Australia on New Year's Day 1941, calling for hope and courage. Lord Gowrie made a similar broadcast the following year. She was an enthusiast for the Girl Guides movement, president of the South Australian branch of the Red Cross Society and was associated with the Victoria League.

== Diplomatic incident ==
In early 1941, Tatsuo Kawai took up his post as Japan's first Ambassador to Australia. He met Lady Gowrie and offered to present her with a bonsai pine tree. Australia declared war on Japan in December 1941, and Kawai was placed under house arrest pending repatriation to Japan.

In 1942, Lady Gowrie was advised by Sir John Latham, Australia's former representative in Tokyo who was returning to Australia to resume his post as Chief Justice of the High Court of Australia, that Kawai now wanted to honour his offer. She indicated she would be delighted to accept the gift, even though the two nations were now at war and over 20,000 Australian soldiers were in Japanese captivity following the fall of Singapore. Her reply to Kawai was stopped by the Secretary of the Department of External Affairs, and the bonsai tree was never presented to her.

== Return to England ==
At the end of Lord Gowrie's term as Governor-General in 1945, they returned to England. Later that year, Baron Gowrie was created 1st Earl of Gowrie, and Baroness Gowrie became the Countess of Gowrie. He died in 1955, and she died on 19 July 1965, aged 86, survived by two grandsons, one of whom had succeeded his grandfather as the 2nd Earl of Gowrie in 1955.

Dame Joan Hammond's career had come to an end through illness, and she sang in public for the last time at Lady Gowrie's funeral on 30 July 1965, at St. George's Chapel, Windsor Castle. Hammond was the first woman to be granted royal permission to sing in that chapel.

== Children ==
The Gowries had two sons. The younger, Alistair Malise Hore-Ruthven, was born on 2 August 1917, but died the following year. The elder, Patrick Hore-Ruthven, a poet and soldier, was born on 30 August 1913 and was killed on active service in Libya on 24 December 1942, after leading a commando raid on Tripoli. A collection of his poetry, The Happy Warrior, was published in 1943, with a preface by his mother. Patrick's elder son, Grey Ruthven, succeeded his grandfather as 2nd Earl of Gowrie.

== Legacies ==
The Lady Gowrie Lookout overlooks Sydney Harbour east of the CBD. It is situated adjacent to Kirribilli House, the Sydney residence of the Prime Minister of Australia.

Sydney-based singer/songwriter Dan Schaumann wrote and recorded a song in 2011 called Lady Gowrie Lookout. The song is based on a couple's declaration of love for each other graffitied onto the rocks at the lookout's base, exclaiming "James & Georgie, one year and forever".

Lady Gowrie was also a gardener, and the Alister Clark rose 'Zara Hore-Ruthven' and Fitzhardinge rose 'Lady Gowrie' (now lost) were named after her. The Waterhouse camellia 'Lady Gowrie' was named for her when Waterhouse was 70 and she was 72.

Lady Gowrie Drive is a road in Adelaide that runs north along the seafront from Largs Bay to Osborne. It continues around the North Haven Golf Course as Lady Ruthven Drive, then returns southward as Victoria Road.

A plaque was affixed to a sundial in the garden of Yarralumla, Canberra, which reads: "1936-1944, the Australian Children remember with affection the Lord and Lady Gowrie. Presented to the Commonwealth by the Honourable Clive R Evatt."

== See also ==
- Spouse of the Governor-General of Australia
