= Medical Aid for Palestinians =

British medical charity benefiting Palestine

- Established: 1982; 44 years ago
- Founders: Ang Swee Chai; Derek Cooper; Pamela Cooper
- Registration no.: 1045315
- Legal status: Charitable company
- Headquarters: London
- Region served: Occupied West Bank and East Jerusalem; Gaza; Lebanon
- Chairperson: Nick Maynard
- President: Baroness Morris of Bolton
- Chief Executive Officer: Stephen Cutts
- Website: www.map.org.uk

Medical Aid for Palestinians (MAP) is a British charity that offers medical services in the West Bank, Gaza and Lebanon, and advocates for Palestinians' rights to health and dignity. It is in special consultative status with ECOSOC since 2002.

== History and mission ==
Medical Aid for Palestinians (MAP) was founded in 1982 by Dr Ang Swee Chai, Major Derek Cooper, and his wife, Mrs Pamela Cooper, in the wake of the 1982 Sabra and Shatila massacre in Lebanon.

Medical Aid for Palestinians' stated aim is to meet the humanitarian needs of the Palestinian people. The organization and its programmes have been supported by the British public, the UK Government (DfID), the European Union and international aid organizations. They deliver basic health and medical care to Palestinian refugees and they strive to establish permanent medical infrastructure in Palestinian communities by training health care practitioners, teaching medical vocational skills and addressing the requirements of particularly vulnerable groups such as people with disabilities.

In July 2023, due to a reported increase in "attacks on healthcare workers and ambulances by Israeli forces and settlers", MAP diverted from its usual strategy of providing healthcare to supplying bulletproof vests and helmets for the protection of Palestinian health workers. Later that year, in response to the Gaza war, the organisation launched an emergency appeal to provide essential healthcare and medical aid in Gaza. The appeal was supported by London mayor Sadiq Khan.

In 2024, an auction, Cinema for Gaza, was organised for MAP, raising over $52,000 on the first day. It included donations from Tilda Swinton, Brian Cox, Ken Loach, Joanna Hogg, Mike Leigh, Ramy Youssef, Maxine Peake, Frankie Boyle, Aisling Bea, Aimee Lou Wood, Peter Capaldi, Karen Gillan and more. The auction, which started on April 2, would end on April 12. The 2026 documentary film Life Support features testimony from doctors working in Gaza on behalf of Medical Aid for Palestinians.

== Programmes ==
=== Direct aid ===
Medical Aid for Palestinians works with local non-governmental organizations and the Palestinian Health Service or provide practical medical support to Palestinians living under occupation or as refugees. Its programs cover the five priority areas in the occupied Palestinian territory and Palestinian refugee communities in Lebanon:

- Essential primary and public healthcare
- Women and children's health
- Emergency preparedness and response
- Mental health and psycho-social support
- Disability

=== Advocacy and campaigns ===
MAP actively campaigns in the UK to raise awareness about violations of the Palestinian right to health, which is threatened by ongoing conflict, prolonged occupation and displacement. Working in coalition with other NGOs, the scope of MAP's advocacy programme ranges from raising public awareness to advocating on salient issues with governments and policy makers.

== People ==
Since September 2024, MAP's chief executive officer has been Stephen Cutts, who acted in the interim after his predecessor Melanie Ward had resigned to take up her parliamentary seat before having his position made permanent in 2025. Professor Nick Maynard, a long time volunteer medic who had led the charity's operation in Gaza in December 2023, was appointed as chair of the charity in 2025.

Since November 2011, MAP's honorary president has been Baroness Morris of Bolton. Prior to Morris's tenure, the role was briefly held between February 2010 and May 2011 by Baron Patten of Barnes, who resigned from the position to take up headship of the BBC trust. Others who have previously served in this position include Helena Kennedy, Baroness Kennedy of The Shaws, Lord Steel of Aikwood, and Baron Gilmour of Craigmillar.

=== Volunteers ===
Medical professionals who have volunteered with the charity include:

- Ghassan Abu-Sittah
- Professor Nizam Mamode
- John Beavis
- Sir Terence English
- Lady Patience Moberly
