= Malise Ruthven =

Anglo-Irish academic and writer (born 1942)

- Education: Eton College; University of Cambridge

Malise Walter Maitland Knox Hore-Ruthven (born 14 May 1942) is an Anglo-Irish academic and writer.

== Early life and education ==
Born in Dublin in 1942, Ruthven was educated at Eton College before earning an M.A. (Cantab.) in English literature at Trinity College, Cambridge. He then worked as a scriptwriter with the BBC Arabic and World Service, and as a consultant on Middle Eastern affairs.

In 2000 Ruthven earned his PhD in Social and Political Sciences at the University of Cambridge. Having pursued a career as a writer, journalist and teacher, he focuses his work on religion, fundamentalism, and especially Islamic affairs.

== Teacher ==
He has taught Islamic studies, cultural history and comparative religion at the University of Aberdeen, Scotland, Birkbeck College, University of London, UC-San Diego, Dartmouth College (New Hampshire, USA) and Colorado College (Colorado Springs, Colorado, USA)

He has given numerous lectures as an expert on the Middle East. He has been described by Madeleine Bunting for The Guardian as "one of today's most perceptive observers and historians of religion".

== Journalist ==
Malise Ruthven's book reviews have appeared in The Sunday Times, The Guardian, The Observer, The Times Literary Supplement, Prospect magazine and The New York Review of Books (NYR). His blog for the NYR, "Revolution by Latrine", won an award from the Overseas Press Club of America in April 2011.

He is a regular contributor to the NYR, where he has written articles and reviews on such topics as Al Qaeda, Islam in Europe, unanswered questions in the Lockerbie crash and the repression of gay people in Iran. He also contributes occasionally to the BBC. He used the term "Islamofascism" as early as 8 September 1990 in The Independent. In 2004, London's Prospect magazine ranked Ruthven among the 100 top public intellectuals in the UK.

== Family ==
Malise Ruthven is the younger son of Patrick Hore-Ruthven and Pamela Margaret Fletcher.

His elder brother was Grey Ruthven, 2nd Earl of Gowrie and Alexander Hore-Ruthven, 1st Earl of Gowrie, was his grandfather.

He is the godson of the late Dame Freya Stark, whom his parents knew in Cairo in 1942; Ruthven published several collections of Stark's photographs.

== Publications ==
Books

- Torture: The Grand Conspiracy (1978). London: Weidenfeld and Nicolson. ISBN 0-297-77389-5
- Traveller Through Time: A Photographic Journey with Freya Stark (1986). London: Viking. ISBN 0-670-80183-6
- The Divine Supermarket: Travels in Search of the Soul of America (1989). London: Chatto. ISBN 0-7011-3151-9
- A Satanic Affair: Salman Rushdie and the Rage of Islam (1990). London: Chatto. ISBN 0-7011-3591-3
- Freya Stark in the Levant: Lebanon, Syria, Jordan, Palestine (1994) Reading: Garnet Publishing ISBN 1-85964-003-6
- Freya Stark in Iraq and Kuwait (1994) Reading: Garnet Publishing ISBN 1-85964-004-4
- Freya Stark in Persia (1994) Reading: Garnet Publishing ISBN 1-85964-011-7
- Islam: A Very Short Introduction (2000). Oxford: Oxford University Press. ISBN 0-19-285389-9
- Fury for God: the Islamist Attack on America (2002). London: Granta. ISBN 1-86207-540-9
- Fundamentalism: the Search for Meaning (2004). Oxford: Oxford University Press. ISBN 0-19-284091-6
- Historical Atlas of the Islamic World (2004). (with Azim Nanji). Oxford: Oxford University Press. ISBN 0-19-860997-3
- Islam in the World (1984, 1999, 2006). Oxford: Oxford University Press. ISBN 0-19-520454-9
- Unholy Kingdom: Religion, Corruption and Violence in Saudi Arabia (2025) ISBN 9781839760105

Ruthven contributed an afterword to the most recent edition of Albert Hourani's History of the Arab Peoples, bringing that work up to date following Hourani's death. Dr Ruthven is internationally recognised for his work on Muslim thought and theology, fundamentalism, Mormonism, the social impact of religion and migration and the nexus between contemporary politics and belief.

Articles

- Ruthven, Malise; Stack, Peggy Fletcher (Spring 1991). "The Mormons' Progress". The Wilson Quarterly. 15 (2): 22–47. ISSN 0363-3276. OCLC 609064233. Archived from the original (fee required) on 18 July 2011.

Recorded lectures

- Gnostic themes in the Abrahamic family of religions, Malise Ruthven, British Museum, Middle East Now podcast series, April to September 2006
