= Grey Gowrie =

British peer and politician (1939–2021)

The Right Honourable The Earl of Gowrie PC FRSL
- 1992 portrait

Chancellor of the Duchy of Lancaster
- In office 11 September 1984 – 2 September 1985
- Prime Minister: Margaret Thatcher
- Preceded by: The Lord Cockfield
- Succeeded by: Norman Tebbit

Minister of State for the Arts
- In office 11 June 1983 – 2 September 1985
- Prime Minister: Margaret Thatcher
- Preceded by: Paul Channon
- Succeeded by: Richard Luce

Minister of State for Northern Ireland
- In office 15 September 1981 – 10 June 1983
- Prime Minister: Margaret Thatcher
- Preceded by: Michael Alison
- Succeeded by: The Earl of Mansfield

Minister of State for Employment
- In office 7 May 1979 – 15 September 1981
- Prime Minister: Margaret Thatcher
- Preceded by: Harold Walker
- Succeeded by: Michael Alison

Lord-in-waiting Government Whip
- In office 7 April 1972 – 4 March 1974
- Prime Minister: Edward Heath
- Preceded by: new appointment
- Succeeded by: The Lord Jacques

Member of the House of Lords Lord Temporal
- In office 27 November 1960 – 11 November 1999; Hereditary Peerage
- Preceded by: The 1st Earl of Gowrie
- Succeeded by: Seat abolished

Minister of State for the Privy Council Office
- In office 11 June 1983 – 11 September 1984
- Preceded by: Alma Birk, Baroness Birk
- Succeeded by: Richard Luce

Personal details
- Born: Alexander Patrick Greysteil Hore-Ruthven; 26 November 1939 Dublin, Ireland
- Died: 24 September 2021 (aged 81) Llanfechain, Wales
- Party: Conservative
- Spouses: Alexandra Bingley (m. 1962; div. 1973) Adelheid Gräfin von der Schulenburg (m. 1974)
- Children: 1
- Parents: Patrick Hore-Ruthven (father); Pamela Cooper (mother)
- Education: Balliol College, Oxford; Harvard University

Alexander Patrick Greysteil Hore-Ruthven, 2nd Earl of Gowrie, PC, FRSL (26 November 1939 – 24 September 2021), usually known as Grey Gowrie or Lord Gowrie, was an Irish-born British hereditary peer, politician, and businessman. Lord Gowrie was also the hereditary Clan Chief of Clan Ruthven in Scotland. He was educated at Eton and Oxford, and held posts in academia for a period, in the US and London, including time working with poet Robert Lowell and at Harvard University.

Gowrie was a Conservative Party politician for some years, including a period in the British Cabinet. He held ministerial posts under Margaret Thatcher, in the areas of employment and Northern Ireland, and was Minister of State for the Arts, as well as Chancellor of the Duchy of Lancaster, with responsibility for Civil Service reform. Offered a promotion to full Secretary of State, with responsibility for education across the UK, he turned it down. Previously an arts dealer, he moved to Sotheby's for a reputed salary of around £150,000, chairing parts of the art auction business. He later chaired the Arts Council of England (1994–1998).

He published several volumes of poetry, with a collected edition released in 2014, and a volume on the artist Derek Hill; he was also a contributing author for a book on British painting. He underwent a heart transplant at Harefield Hospital in his early sixties. He died at his home in Llanfechain, Powys, Wales, in September 2021.

== Life ==
=== Early life and education ===
Alexander Patrick Greysteil Hore-Ruthven was born on 26 November 1939, in Dublin, Ireland, the elder son of Major the Hon. Patrick Hore-Ruthven and Pamela Margaret Fletcher. His father was the only surviving son of Alexander Hore-Ruthven, later the 1st Earl of Gowrie in its new creation, and his wife Zara. He had one sibling, younger brother Malise Ruthven, later a writer. His paternal grandfather was a soldier and colonial official, and his maternal grandfather an Anglican cleric, A. H. Fletcher. He was known as "Grey", short for his third forename, to most, and "Greysteil" to close friends. His surname drew on the Ruthven clan of Scotland, a name once outlawed, and the Hore family of County Wexford, Ireland.

His parents were both active in Cairo during the Second World War, his father, "Pat" to the family, as a major in the Rifle Brigade, and his mother working with the intelligence services. His parents left Grey, at the age of three months, with his maternal grandmother in Ireland. His father was killed in action at Tripoli in 1942, while attached to the then-new SAS, at which point Gowrie became his paternal grandfather's heir apparent; his grandparents played an active role in his upbringing thereafter. On his mother's return to Ireland in early 1942 while pregnant with his brother, they lived for a period in what she described as a dreary house in Greystones, County Wicklow. Hore-Ruthven was educated at Eton, where he contributed poetry, fiction and prose to school magazine Parade; he was later elected to the elite Eton Society, more commonly known as Pop.

When his grandfather, who had been the Governor-General of Australia, was created Earl of Gowrie in January 1945, reviving a title suppressed in 1600, Grey became known by the courtesy title Viscount Ruthven of Canberra. His family moved for a time to a tower at Windsor Castle, where the 1st Earl was deputy constable, and then returned to Ireland, living in Dublin and Kilcullen, County Kildare. His mother remarried in 1952, to her partner Major Derek Cooper, and the family moved to a Regency lodge on a 4,000-acre country estate at Dunlewey, a village at the edge of the Poisoned Glen in Gweedore, County Donegal.

=== Titles and university ===
The young Lord Ruthven of Canberra succeeded to the Earldom of Gowrie, named for the old Scottish area of Gowrie around Perth, on the death of his grandfather on 2 May 1955; at the same time he succeeded as the 2nd Viscount Ruthven of Canberra, and as the 2nd Baron Gowrie of Canberra and of Dirleton (in East Lothian). On 16 April 1956, he further succeeded his great-uncle (his grandfather's elder brother), the 2nd Baron Ruthven of Gowrie and 10th Lord Ruthven of Freeland, as the 3rd Baron Ruthven of Gowrie. The Scottish lordship of Ruthven of Freeland did not descend to him, passing instead through the female line. He matriculated his coat of arms with the Lord Lyon King of Arms in 1959.

After Eton, Gowrie attended Balliol College, Oxford, and while there he succeeded Paul Foot as editor of The Isis Magazine. In 1962 he was given charge of the arts budget for the junior common room of his college, and he purchased an early work by David Hockney, who was still in art college. Entitled The Most Beautiful Boy in the World, it cost £75 but was unpopular with some at Balliol, having a cup of tea thrown at it. Gowrie arranged an interpretative talk about it, but the JCR declined to retain it, and its dealer bought it back for £80; it was later sold for £13,800.

=== Academic and art dealer ===
Gowrie worked for the Times Literary Supplement for a short time, and taught, meeting his future wife while working in a girls' school. After marriage, he moved to the US, working as a visiting lecturer at the State University of New York (SUNY) at Buffalo from 1963 to 1964, then tutoring at Harvard University from 1965 to 1968, while also working with poet Robert Lowell.

Gowrie returned from the US in 1969, as lecturer in English and American Literature at University College London; he also trained as an art dealer in Bond Street, working with Thomas Gibson Fine Art. Early deals included a portrait of Peter Lacy by Francis Bacon, which Gowrie offered first, at no commission, to the National Gallery of Ireland. When the gallery rejected the work of "this disgraceful artist", he sold it to Elton John. He dealt in Old Masters, Picassos, and David Hockney at an early stage, and on one occasion sold a Jackson Pollock to the National Gallery of Art in Washington, D.C., for $2 million. He produced his first volume of poetry, A Postcard from Don Giovanni, in 1972; David Hockney produced a sketch of Gowrie for its front cover.

=== Political career ===
==== Whip and front bench ====
Gowrie became a member of the Conservative Party, and made his maiden speech in the House of Lords in 1968, speaking on reform of the house. In 1971 he represented the British parliament on the Human Rights Committee of the United Nations. He joined the Conservative front bench under Ted Heath in 1972 as a Lord-in-waiting and Conservative whip in the House of Lords, posts he held until 1974. While the Conservatives were in opposition from 1974 to 1979, he was spokesperson on economic affairs. Gowrie was seen as socially liberal but at the same time was described as an early convert to Thatcherite policies, and at the "dry" end of his party's debates between wets and dries. Denis Healey, his Government opponent (Chancellor of the Exchequer 1974 to 1979), said of him, "Grey is the only Conservative who understands monetarism".

His first ministerial post was under Margaret Thatcher, as Minister of State for Employment between 1979 and 1981, a time of industrial unrest. His Secretary of State was Jim Prior.

==== Northern Ireland ====
Gowrie followed his senior minister to Northern Ireland, where he was Minister of State and Deputy Secretary of State at the Northern Ireland Office (NIO) from 1981 to 1983, during the period of IRA hunger strikes; he was noted as "expressing quiet admiration for what he saw as the dying men's misguided courage". He described himself as an "Irishman with a Scots name and a German wife, working, somewhat to his surprise, for a very English government". He was involved in the legalisation of homosexual acts in Northern Ireland in 1982, remarking to Ian Paisley, who led delegations opposed to the move, "We're not proposing to make it compulsory". Paisley labelled him "the little green Lord", apparently only partially a sartorial comment. He also played a part in discussions about restoring devolved government and proposed a model using a formal arrangement between the two main communities of Northern Ireland, somewhat like that which was eventually introduced under the Good Friday Agreement. He is said to have "made little secret of his support for Irish unity" and he proposed joint British and Irish citizenship for Northern Irish people, the option of which was also enshrined in the Good Friday Agreement. He also commented that "Orange and Green both had an appetite for public spending undreamed of by Grantham or Finchley".

==== The Arts and the Duchy of Lancaster ====
In 1983, Thatcher appointed Gowrie as the Arts Minister, and during his time in that office, he updated and funded a scheme which allowed donations of art to public galleries and museums to be offset against death duties. His philosophy around arts funding reflected his broader political philosophy – he said both "I approach arts funding as an economist" and that his former job of arts minister should not exist as "The problem with having a minister is that he is in competition with highly political areas like health or social security ... I think every year there should be a type of Church Commissioner thing where the money is just handed out." He was credited with the scheme to nationalise many of the galleries and museums of the Liverpool areas, as National Museums and Galleries on Merseyside, when they were threatened with closure. He said that rumours that Thatcher favoured cuts to arts funding were false: "We had this deal that I was to complain royally and whinge about money, but she'd smuggle me some. And we didn't have great cuts; that's all a myth." He was sworn of the Privy Council and entered the Cabinet. He was Chancellor of the Duchy of Lancaster from 1984, with additional responsibility for personnel and management of the Civil Service. In 1985, when he asked to move from his Arts post, Thatcher offered him a promotion to the post of Secretary of State for Education, where she believed that he could "electrify education". Instead he resigned from the Cabinet, stating that it was impossible for him to live in London on the £33,000 salary provided for peers working in such posts. This claim that caused some negative public comment, as it was three times the average London wage of the time. Thatcher described his departure from her government as "the greatest loss".

=== Later career ===
After leaving government, Gowrie in 1985 took up a post as chairperson of Sotheby's International, overseeing the auction house's business in Europe and the Far East, at a reputed salary of around £150,000. This followed rumours that he might take a senior role at Sotheby's major rival, Christie's. He was also brought on to the global board of Sotheby's under Alfred Taubman; he worked for the company until 1994. During his time at Sotheby's he was appointed as chairperson of the trustees of the Serpentine Gallery in Kensington Gardens, newly taken under State management, with Diana, Princess of Wales as patron.

Following the division of the work of the Arts Council of Great Britain, it was announced in December 1993 that Gowrie would be the first chairperson of the new Arts Council of England He assumed office at the Arts Council on 1 April 1994, having secured its role as a distributor of funds from the National Lottery. He supported, and later inaugurated, the Angel of the North sculpture. He chaired the Booker Prize panel which dismissed A Suitable Boy, of which he commented "we wanted the book to succeed ...we thought it was abysmally edited and tailored. ... promising lines of development and tension kept running out. The book needed cutting, like a movie." The panel instead awarded the 1993 prize to Roddy Doyle's Paddy Clarke Ha Ha Ha.

Gowrie took up a role as a non-executive director of major betting firm Coral Ladbrokes and in 1995 he became non-executive chairman of property company Development Securities plc. He lectured on English and American literature at Harvard and University College, London. He also held the unpaid post of Provost of the Royal College of Art from 1985 to 1996.

Gowrie opened the first Bacon exhibition in the Soviet Union, in 1988 at the Central House of Artists in Moscow, for which he also wrote the catalogue introduction. He also made a number of television appearances, including in a 2017 documentary on the Anglo-Irish artist Francis Bacon, a programme on the Irish art collector Garech Browne, and a 2009 documentary on artist and British folk revivalist and blues pioneer Rory McEwen, the Poet Laureate. He also appeared in a programme on the Royal National Theatre, as well as multiple episodes of Question Time in the 1980s.

Gowrie was a patron of the Elton John AIDS Foundation. Together with Rowan Williams and Daniel Day-Lewis, he was also a patron of the Wilfred Owen Association, formed in 1989 to commemorate the life and work of the renowned First World War poet Wilfred Owen. He was a founding director of the British Fund for the National Gallery of Ireland (later the International Friends of the National Gallery of Ireland), from 1996 to 2000, rejoining in 2003, serving as co-chairman, and stepping down in 2011. In 2008, he accepted an invitation from CEO Farad Azima to chair the newly-formed Advisory Board of the Iran Heritage Foundation. He was also a member of the Advisory Council of the London Symphony Orchestra.

== Writing ==
=== Early writings ===
Gowrie published one volume of poetry in his 20s, A Postcard from Don Giovanni, after a period working as an assistant to American poet Robert Lowell, and later contributed the chapter on 20th century painting to a book on British painting, The Genius of British Painting, published in 1975. In 1987 he published a biography and artistic profile of the artist Derek Hill, Derek Hill: An Appreciation.

=== Health and later writings ===
In the summer of 1999, having been diagnosed with a serious heart condition, he received a heart transplant at Harefield Hospital and, after a long recovery, left hospital in 2000; his health remained frail thereafter. He became friends with his principal surgeon, Magdi Yacoub, and chaired the institute named for him. Following his release from hospital, he published his first book of poetry for decades, The Domino Hymn, which contains references to his illness — the title refers to the fact that he was a "domino patient", i.e. one who received a heart from a fellow patient undergoing a heart-and-lung transplant. He later also released Third Day with a mix of new and collected poetry. A "Collected Poems" was released in 2014, and reissued in 2017. In 2003, he was elected a Fellow of the Royal Society of Literature.

== Personal life ==
=== Residences ===
Gowrie inherited Castlemartin House and Estate at Kilcullen in County Kildare, Ireland, from his great-aunt, Sheelagh Blacker, in 1967, and later sold it to Tony O'Reilly. He lived partly in Ireland until 1983, and then, selling his Kildare house to Ronnie Wood, moved to the Welsh Marches village of Llanfechain in what was formerly Montgomeryshire. Lord Gowrie presided over the local show in Llanfechain in 1998, and attended the regional literary festival. He maintained a London home for much of his adult life, during his time in ministerial office in Covent Garden, latterly a house in Kensington.

=== Family ===
Gowrie married Xandra (Alexandra) Bingley, daughter of Colonel Robert Bingley, on 1 November 1962. They had one son, Patrick Leo Brer Hore-Ruthven, born 4 February 1964. Generally known as Brer Ruthven, he became a database developer and musician. Brer Ruthven married Julie Goldsmith and had one son, Heathcote Patrick Cornelius Ruthven, born 28 May 1990. Gowrie and Alexandra Bingley, who became a writer and editor, divorced in 1973.

On 2 November 1974, Gowrie married Adelheid Gräfin von der Schulenburg (b. 24 October 1943), who was the sixth and youngest child and fifth daughter of Fritz-Dietlof Graf von der Schulenburg (1902–10 August 1944), a German Graf (Count) and one of the leaders of the 1944 plot to assassinate Hitler, and his wife Charlotte Kotelmann. He was known to describe himself as "an Irishman with a Scots title, married to a German" and to say "I am a Nationalist, not a Unionist".

=== Friends ===
Gowrie remained friends with Lowell, his poetic mentor, and was a pallbearer at his funeral. He was also closely associated with Edward Plunkett, the Anglo-Irish painter. He described Margaret Thatcher, Francis Bacon and Andrew Lloyd Webber as among his best friends. He had come to know Bacon later in life, but discovered that they had both partly grown up around the same small town, Kilcullen in County Kildare. He was also friends with Boris Johnson, leading the pre-wedding dinner for Johnson's first marriage. He participated in a television documentary about another friend, Guinness heir Garech Browne. Auberon "Bron" Waugh pursued a decades-long public vendetta with Gowrie, over a romantic competition at Oxford which Gowrie had won; despite this, when Waugh died, Gowrie described him as "the greatest journalist of my generation".

=== Death ===
Lord Gowrie died at his home in Llanfechain, Powys, Wales, on 24 September 2021, at the age of 81, from COVID-19 during the COVID-19 pandemic in Wales. His son succeeded to the peerages and the clan chieftainship.

Political offices
Preceded by Harold Walker	Minister of State for Employment; 1979–1981	Succeeded by Michael Alison
Preceded by Michael Alison	Minister of State for Northern Ireland; 1981–1983	Succeeded by The Earl of Mansfield
Preceded by Paul Channon	Minister of State for the Arts; 1983–1985	Succeeded by Richard Luce
Preceded by The Lord Cockfield	Chancellor of the Duchy of Lancaster; 1984–1985	Succeeded by Norman Tebbit
Cultural offices
Preceded by The Lord Palumbo, last chair of the Arts Council of GB	Chairperson of the Arts Council of England; 1994–1998	Succeeded by Gerry Robinson
Peerage of the United Kingdom
Preceded by Alexander Hore-Ruthven	Earl of Gowrie; 1955–2021	Succeeded by Brer Ruthven
Preceded by Walter Hore-Ruthven	Baron Ruthven of Gowrie; 1956–2021	Succeeded by Brer Ruthven
