= Melanie Ward =

British Labour politician (born 1981)

Melanie Ward MP
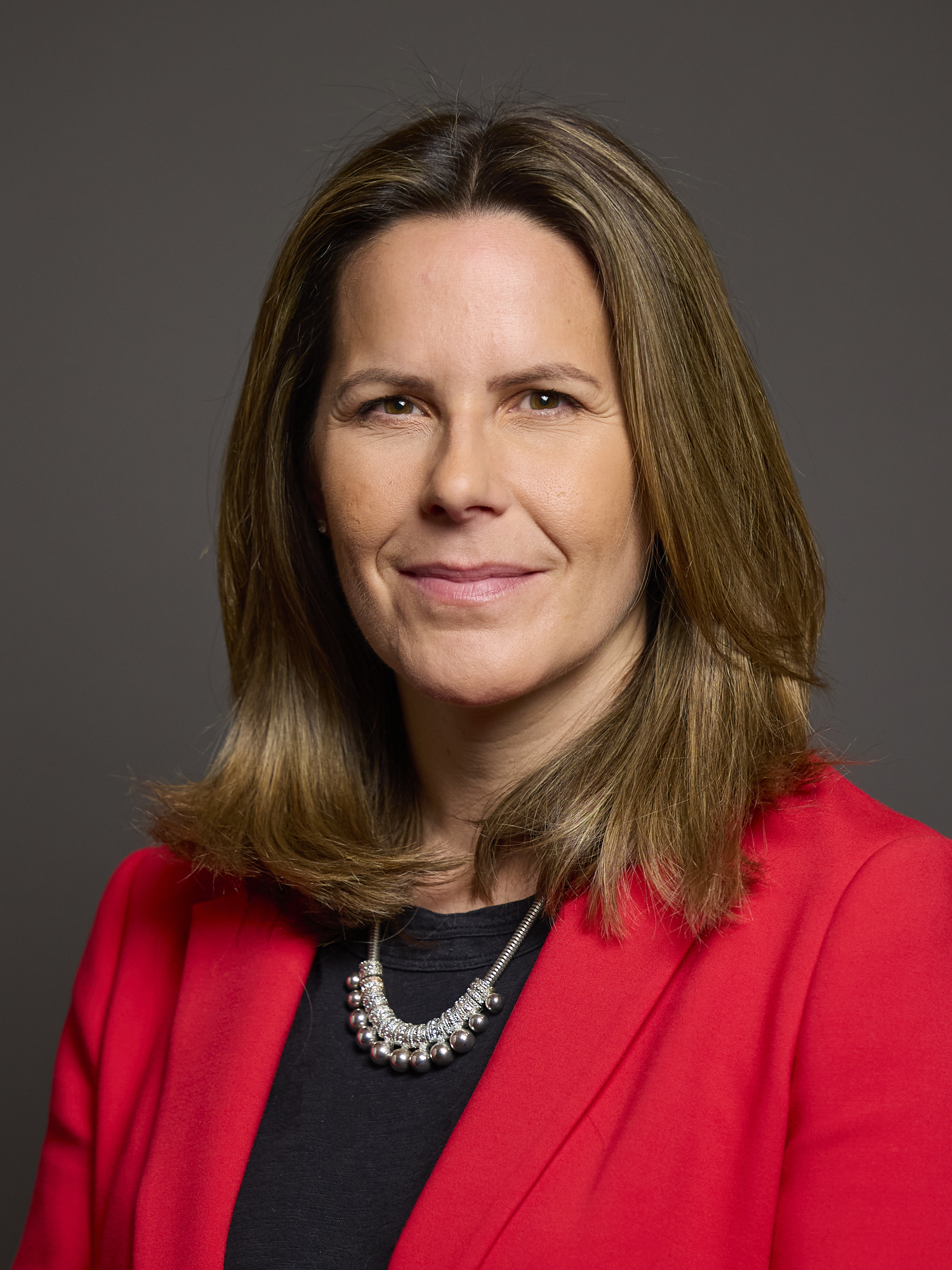
- Official portrait, 2024

Parliamentary Under-Secretary of State for Scotland
- Incumbent
- Assumed office 22 July 2026
- Prime Minister: Andy Burnham
- Preceded by: Kirsty McNeill

Member of Parliament for Cowdenbeath and Kirkcaldy
- Incumbent
- Assumed office 4 July 2024
- Preceded by: Neale Hanvey
- Majority: 7,248 (17.7%)

Personal details
- Born: Melanie Claire Ward; February 1981 (age 45) Helensburgh, Dunbartonshire, Scotland
- Party: Labour
- Education: University of Stirling (BA); SOAS University of London (MA)
- Website: Official website

Melanie Claire Ward (born February 1981) is a Scottish Labour politician who has served as Parliamentary Under-Secretary of State for Scotland since her appointment by Andy Burnham in July 2026 and as Member of Parliament for Cowdenbeath and Kirkcaldy since 2024.

Until her election in 2024, Ward was a humanitarian aid worker, working for several prominent international charities in succession. She was chief executive officer of Medical Aid for Palestinians from 2023 to 2024.

== Early life and education ==
Ward was born in Helensburgh on the Firth of Clyde. She attended the local Hermitage Academy. She received a Bachelor of Arts degree in human resource management from the University of Stirling, and served as President of the National Union of Students Scotland. Ward received a Master of Arts degree in international studies and diplomacy from SOAS University of London in 2009.

== Charity career ==
Ward has worked for several charities, including Christian Aid, and ActionAid UK. For a time she chaired The Circle, which is a charity that Annie Lennox founded to empower women. By December 2015, Ward was the associate director of policy and advocacy for International Rescue Committee UK (IRC). She was still working for IRC in September 2021.

In September 2022, Medical Aid for Palestinians (MAP) announced that it had appointed Ward to become its new CEO. She took up her position in January 2023. In May 2024, Time included her in its "Time100 Health" list of influential workers in the health sector. In May 2024, MAP granted her leave of absence for the duration of that year's general election campaign. On 4 July she was elected as an MP and the next day she resigned as CEO of MAP.

== Politics ==
Ward was the Labour candidate for Glenrothes in the 2015 general election. Labour had held Glenrothes since the seat was created in 2005, but in 2015 Peter Grant of the SNP won the seat from Labour with a majority of 13,987, and Ward came second.

Ward opposed Jeremy Corbyn throughout his leadership of the Labour Party. In August 2015, when Corbyn was campaigning to be elected leader, she tweeted a link to an article by Leo McKinstry in The Daily Telegraph that accused Corbyn of being an "unreconstructed Trotskyite", and in her tweet she urged party members to "think again". In June 2016 she called for Corbyn to resign as Leader of the Labour Party, and encouraged other members and supporters of the party to petition him to do so.

Ward opposed Brexit, and supported the People's Vote campaign for another referendum on UK membership of the European Union. In 2018 and 2019 she criticised Corbyn for not calling for another referendum.

The day after Labour lost the 2019 General Election, Ward tweeted "Corbyn and his hard left band of supporters control every part of the Labour Party. This is their failure. They need to own it, take responsibility and get out of the way. Our country and our most vulnerable people will pay the price for what they have done. Gutted." When Corbyn stepped down as leader in April 2020, Ward tweeted "Farewell to Jeremy Corbyn, who really was a truly terrible Labour Party Leader. He will be missed not one little bit by those of us who want to see Labour in government again".

In November 2023, Ward applied to be the Labour candidate for Beckenham and Penge.

In May 2024, the National Executive Committee of the Labour Party appointed her as the Labour candidate for Cowdenbeath and Kirkcaldy, which the party had lost to Neale Hanvey in the 2019 general election. On 4 July 2024 she was elected with a majority of 7,248, winning the seat back for Labour. She was appointed as parliamentary private secretary for Secretary of State for Scotland Ian Murray on 21 July. Her name was included in the Time 2024 list of influential people in health.

In February 2025, MP Melanie Ward spoke in Parliament in support of nurse Sandie Peggie, who had been suspended after objecting to a transgender woman using the female changing rooms in her workplace, and later brought a tribunal case against NHS Fife, alleging sexual harassment and discrimination.

On 11 May 2026, following the Labour Party's defeat in the 2026 Scottish Parliament election, Ward noted many of her constituents said they could not vote Labour as long as Keir Starmer was Prime Minister, and she resigned as parliamentary private secretary to David Lammy, calling for Keir Starmer to resign. She is reportedly close to Wes Streeting.

In June 2026, Ward wrote to the Charity Commission for England and Wales to urge them to investigate 32 charities that have donated over £28 million to Israeli settlements in Israeli-occupied territories that are illegal under international law, including with British taxpayer funding via Gift Aid.

Parliament of the United Kingdom
Preceded by Neale Hanvey	Member of Parliament for Cowdenbeath and Kirkcaldy; 2024–present	Incumbent
