= List of ships named Gowrie =

Gowrie was the name of a number of ships operated by the Dundee, Perth and London Shipping company.

- SS Gowrie (Caledon, 1909), in service 1909-17
- SS Gowrie (Cochrane, 1909), in service 1919-40
- MV Gowrie (1941), in service 1945-48
- MV Gowrie (1939), in service 1948-58
- SS Gowrie (1944), in service 1959-63
