= Alexander Hore-Ruthven, 1st Earl of Gowrie =

British Army officer (1872–1955)

Brigadier-General The Right Honourable The Earl of Gowrie VC GCMG CB DSO & Bar KStJ PC
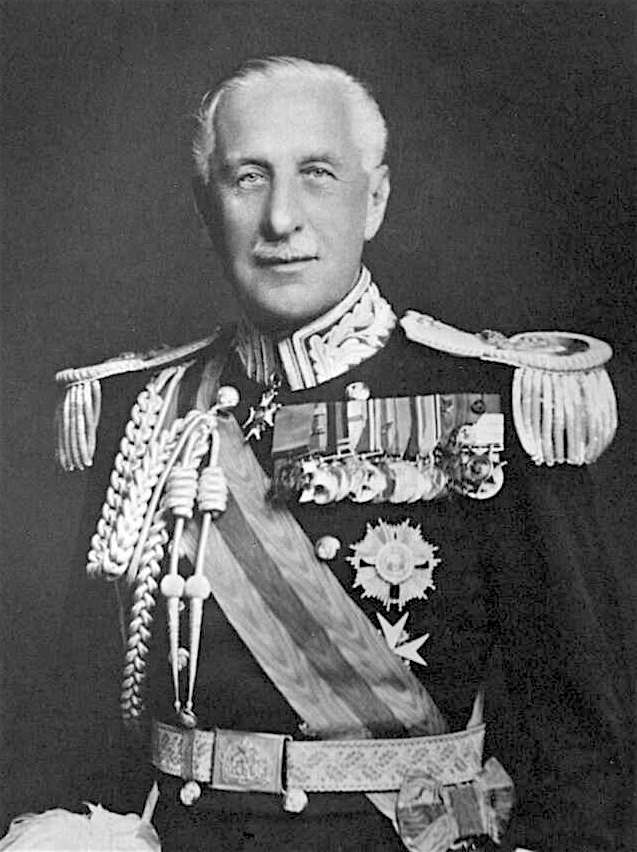
- Gowrie, 1935–45

10th Governor-General of Australia
- In office 23 January 1936 – 30 January 1945
- Monarchs: Edward VIII; George VI
- Prime Minister: Joseph Lyons; Sir Earle Page; Robert Menzies; Arthur Fadden; John Curtin
- Preceded by: Sir Isaac Isaacs
- Succeeded by: The Duke of Gloucester

27th Governor of New South Wales
- In office 15 January 1935 – 23 January 1936
- Monarchs: George V Edward VIII
- Premier: Bertram Stevens
- Lieutenant: Sir Philip Street
- Preceded by: Sir Philip Game
- Succeeded by: Sir David Anderson

20th Governor of South Australia
- In office 14 May 1928 – 26 April 1934
- Monarch: George V
- Premier: Richard Butler; Lionel Hill; Robert Richards; Richard Butler
- Preceded by: Sir George Bridges
- Succeeded by: Sir Winston Joseph Dugan

Personal details
- Born: Alexander Gore Arkwright Hore-Ruthven; 6 July 1872 Windsor, Berkshire, England
- Died: 2 May 1955 (aged 82) Shipton Moyne, Gloucestershire, England
- Spouse: Zara Pollok (m. 1908)
- Children: 2, including Patrick

Military service
- Allegiance: United Kingdom
- Branch/service: British Army
- Years of service: 1889–1928
- Rank: Brigadier-General
- Battles/wars: Mahdist War: Dervish War First World War; Gallipoli campaign; Western Front
- Awards: Victoria Cross; Companion of the Order of the Bath; Distinguished Service Order & Bar; Mentioned in despatches (7)

Brigadier-General Alexander Gore Arkwright Hore-Ruthven, 1st Earl of Gowrie (/ˈhɔːr ˈrɪvɛn/; 6 July 1872 – 2 May 1955) was a British Army officer who served as the tenth governor-general of Australia, in office from 1936 to 1945. He was previously 20th governor of South Australia (1928–1934) and the 27th governor of New South Wales (1935–1936).

Gowrie was born in Windsor, Berkshire, England, into a minor aristocratic family. He joined a voluntary Yeomanry unit at the age of 17, and then enlisted in the regular army at the age of 19. Gowrie fought in the Sudan during the Mahdist Revolt, and was awarded the Victoria Cross for saving a wounded Egyptian soldier. He later served in the Dervish War and as an aide-de-camp to the Lord Lieutenant of Ireland. During the First World War, Gowrie commanded units in the Gallipoli campaign and on the Western Front, winning several further honours. He finished his military career with the rank of brigadier-general.

In 1928, Gowrie was appointed Governor of South Australia. His handling of political instability during the Great Depression was highly regarded, and when his term expired he was appointed Governor of New South Wales. However, Gowrie's second governorship lasted little more than a year, as Joseph Lyons recommended him to become Governor-General. As well as the stresses of the Second World War, he faced several constitutional challenges, including Lyons' death in office and the defeat of Arthur Fadden's government on a confidence motion. Gowrie's term in office was prolonged as a result of war, and in total he spent nine years in the position, the longest of any governor-general.

== Early life and background ==
Alexander Hore-Ruthven was born on 6 July 1872 in Windsor, Berkshire, England, United Kingdom, as the second son of Walter Hore-Ruthven, 9th Lord Ruthven of Freeland, (1838–1921), much later created also Baron Ruthven of Gowrie, and Lady Caroline Annesley Gore (1848–1914), a daughter of the 4th Earl of Arran. After attending Winton House School in Winchester (not Winchester College, as is stated in some sources) as a boarder from 1884 to 1885, Hore-Ruthven spent most of his later education at Eton College and then Haileybury and Imperial Service College, where he stayed until 1888, when he was withdrawn owing to eyesight problems and sent into business by his parents. He first worked in a tea merchant's office in Glasgow and then traveled to British India to work on a tea plantation in Assam Province. Hore-Ruthven, however, soon succumbed to malaria and he returned to England in 1892.

== Military career ==
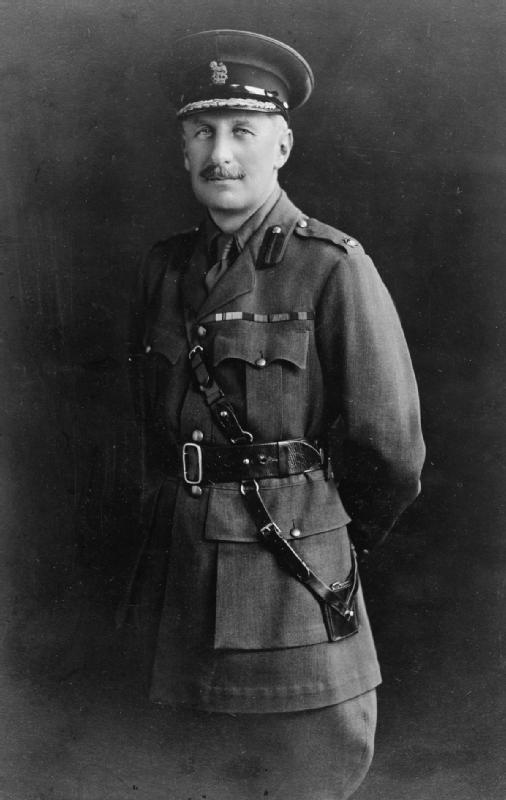
Hore-Ruthven after being awarded the Victoria Cross in 1898

On 19 October 1889, Hore-Ruthven was commissioned a second lieutenant in the Lanarkshire Yeomanry Cavalry. After his return to England in 1892, he then joined the Regular Army. Following training at the United Services College, he was commissioned on 27 April 1893 as a lieutenant in the 3rd Battalion of the Highland Light Infantry, and was promoted to captain on 18 November 1896. During the Mahdist War, he was mentioned in despatches.

During the action at Gedarif on 22 September 1898, Hore-Ruthven performed an act of courage, which earned him the Victoria Cross:

- 28 February 1899 – Captain the Honourable A. G. A. Hore-Ruthven, 3rd Battalion, Highland Light Infantry

The Queen has been graciously pleased to signify Her intention to confer the decoration of the Victoria Cross on the undermentioned Officer, whose claims have been submitted for Her Majesty's approval, for his conspicuous bravery during the attack on the Baggage Guard at the action of Gedarif on the 22nd September 1898, as recorded against his name: On the 22nd September 1898, Captain Hore-Ruthven, seeing an Egyptian officer lying wounded within 50 yards of the advancing Dervishes, who were firing and charging, picked him up and carried him towards the 16th Egyptian Battalion. He dropped the wounded officer two or three times and fired upon the Dervishes, who were following, to check their advance. Had the officer been left where he first dropped, he must have been killed

In May 1899, Hore-Ruthven was also awarded the Order of Osmanieh, Fourth Class, by the Sultan of the Ottoman Empire for his services in the Sudan. On 17 May, he received a regular commission as a second lieutenant in the Queen's Own Cameron Highlanders, dropping back two ranks. In late November, he was part of a Camel Corps during the operations leading to the defeat of the Khalifa (mentioned in despatches 25 November 1899). Promoted to supernumerary lieutenant on 14 December 1900, vice a Lieutenant Murdoch killed in action, he fought in the Dervish War between 1903 and 1904, and was promoted to a regular lieutenancy on 16 April 1904.

In 1905, Hore-Ruthven became an aide-de-camp to Lord Dudley, then Lord Lieutenant of Ireland. Transferring to the 1st (King's) Dragoon Guards in 1908, he was promoted to supernumerary captain in that regiment on 11 April, regaining his former rank after nine years. In 1908, Dudley was appointed Governor-General of Australia, and Hore-Ruthven went with him as military secretary. He left Australia in 1910 and returned to military service in India.

On 2 April 1915, Hore-Ruthven transferred to the Welsh Guards and was promoted to major from the same date. He was appointed a GSO 1 on 18 January 1916, with the temporary rank of lieutenant-colonel, and was awarded the DSO on 1 January 1916. He was awarded a Bar to his DSO on 2 April 1919; the citation reads as follows:

He commanded his brigade with conspicuous gallantry and judgment throughout the operations east of Ypres from 28th September to 27th October 1918, inclusive. His presence and personal bearing at critical times during the fighting was of decisive value, especially during a strong enemy counter-attack. On 20th October, at St. Louis, he went forward among the attacking troops at a critical juncture and inspired them to the final effort, whereby the high ground of great tactical value was captured.

He was promoted to the substantive rank of lieutenant colonel on 15 October 1917 and appointed to the general staff as a temporary brigadier-general on 26 December. On 1 January 1918, he was appointed a Companion of the Order of St Michael and St George (CMG). He was appointed a Companion of the Order of the Bath (CB) on 3 June.

During the First World War, he served in France and at Gallipoli, where he was severely wounded and mentioned in despatches five times. He finished the war as a brigadier general and commanded British forces in Germany between 1919 and 1920. On 14 December 1920, he was appointed the CO of his regiment, with the temporary rank of colonel, and was promoted to colonel on 5 July 1922 (seniority from 15 October 1921). After this he held various Army staff positions, and received command of a brigade on 1 October 1924 in the temporary rank of colonel-commandant, which had replaced the rank of brigadier-general. He relinquished this position, as well as his temporary rank, in April 1928. He was knighted as a Knight Commander of the Order of St Michael and St George (KCMG, 24 January 1928) and appointed Governor of South Australia (being sworn in on 14 May 1928).

== Governor of South Australia ==
Hore-Ruthven arrived in Adelaide in May 1928. He took to his duties with enthusiasm and visited many areas of the State in a de Havilland DH.60 Moth owned by his ADC, Captain Hugh Grosvenor. Together with Lady Hore-Ruthven, he was a keen supporter of the Boy Scout and Girl Guide movements. She was also president of the South Australian Red Cross.

In a 1930 Anzac Day speech, Hore-Ruthven criticised the union movement for exacerbating, through strike action, the hardship suffered by returned servicemen. He was censured by the United Trades and Labour Council in response.

He was on leave in London when the third Bodyline Test cricket match in Adelaide caused Anglo-Australian political tension in 1933, and played a significant part in smoothing relations through his meetings with the British Secretary of State for Dominion Affairs J.H. Thomas.

During Hore-Ruthven's second term as governor, the Great Depression was causing severe hardship in South Australia. The Lionel Hill government, elected on a promise of bringing a "golden future", was heavily criticised when economic realities forced it to adopt austerity measures. Hore-Ruthven supported Premier Hill in the face of criticism from within the Labor Party. His speeches frequently expressed the belief that a premier should "rise above party". Hill's firm resolve during the crisis was seen as largely the result of Hore-Ruthven's influence. His performance during the crisis was reportedly a critical factor in his subsequent selection as Governor of New South Wales.

== Governor of New South Wales ==
His term as Governor of South Australia ended in April 1934, and he returned to England. He was almost immediately appointed Governor of New South Wales and at the suggestion of Prime Minister Joseph Lyons was also raised to the peerage as Baron Gowrie, of Canberra in the Commonwealth of Australia and of Dirleton in the County of East Lothian. He arrived in Sydney on 21 February 1935. However he had already been approached by George V regarding appointment as Governor-General while in England (after the 2nd Marquess of Linlithgow, son of the inaugural governor-general Lord Hopetoun, declined the post). He was raised to Knight Grand Cross of the Order of St Michael and St George (GCMG) on 20 December 1935.

== Governor-General of Australia ==
With his military record and experience, Gowrie was seen as an obvious choice to succeed Sir Isaac Isaacs when he retired as Governor-General in 1936. In accordance with established practice Prime Minister Joseph Lyons was offered several alternatives, but Lyons had no intention of recommending another Australian to the post. At the time, non-Labor Prime Ministers always appointed British Governors-General. In accordance with Australian constitutional practice, he was formally appointed by George V, who died on 20 January 1936, three days before Gowrie was due to be sworn in as Governor-General. Thus, he came to office during the reign of Edward VIII.

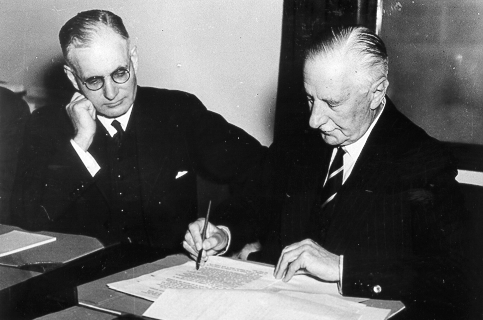
Gowrie signing the declaration of War against Japan with Prime Minister John Curtin looking on.

In office, Gowrie was a popular if unobtrusive figure in Australia. The days that Governors-General exercised significant power, or even participated in negotiations between the Australian and British governments, had now passed, but Gowrie set a precedent in 1938, when he toured the Netherlands East Indies at the invitation of the colonial administration. That was the first time that a Governor-General had represented Australia abroad.

In April 1939 Lyons died suddenly and Gowrie commissioned Sir Earle Page, the leader of the Country Party, as caretaker Prime Minister until Lyons' United Australia Party could choose a new leader. This was the only circumstance in which the Governor-General still had some personal discretion.

Gowrie's political skills were tested again after the 1940 election. The Coalition lost its majority, leaving the UAP Prime Minister, Robert Menzies, dependent on the votes of independents Alexander Wilson and Arthur Coles to stay in power. When the UAP forced Menzies out as leader, it was so bereft of leadership that Country Party leader Arthur Fadden was named Prime Minister, even though the UAP was the senior coalition partner. However, Wilson and Coles were so outraged at how Menzies had been treated that they joined Labor in voting against Fadden's budget and brought the government down. Gowrie was reluctant to call an election for a Parliament just over a year old, especially given the international situation. However, he saw no alternative unless Labor leader John Curtin had enough support to govern. Gowrie's therefore summoned the two independents to Yarralumla and made them promise that if he commissioned Curtin as Prime Minister, they would support him and end the instability in government. The independents agreed, and Gowrie duly appointed Curtin. After some initial uneasiness perhaps inevitable with two such contrasting characters, the vice-regal aristocrat and the tough ALP boss got on well.

During the Second World War, Gowrie saw it as his duty to support the government, the British Empire, and the troops. He supported efforts to encourage the troops, including opening service personnel recreation huts at St Andrew's Cathedral and the Showgrounds for the Church of England National Emergency Fund. In 1943, he undertook a four-week tour of inspection of Allied Defence Forces in northern Australia and New Guinea. Shortly before undertaking this tour, Gowrie and his wife had learned that their son, Patrick, had been killed in Libya the previous year.

Gowrie officially opened the Australian War Memorial on 11 November 1941. He was appointed colonel of the Welsh Guards, his old regiment, in August 1942.

Gowrie's term ended in September 1944 after which he returned to Britain, where he was created Viscount Ruthven of Canberra, of Dirleton in the County of East Lothian, and Earl of Gowrie and appointed Deputy Constable and Lieutenant-Governor of Windsor Castle. In 1948, he was elected president of the Marylebone Cricket Club. He died in May 1955 at his home in Gloucestershire.

He was the only Governor-General of Australia to be advised by five different Prime Ministers (Lyons, Page, Menzies, Fadden and Curtin), although two (Page and Fadden) were short-term appointments.

== Marriage and children ==
Gowrie married Zara Eileen Pollok (who eventually became Zara Hore-Ruthven, Countess of Gowrie when the Gowrie earldom was created in 1945) on 1 June 1908. The couple had two sons, one of whom died in infancy:

- Major Hon Alexander Hardinge Patrick Hore-Ruthven (born 30 August 1913, died 24 December 1942), father of Grey Ruthven, 2nd Earl of Gowrie
- Alistair Malise Hore-Ruthven (born 2 August 1917, died 4 August 1917)

Lady Gowrie became renowned for her work in promoting the welfare of children in Australia, and the Lady Gowrie Child Centres were named in her honour. She died in 1965 at the age of 86.

Lord Gowrie died in 1955 aged 82 and was succeeded in the earldom and other titles by his grandson, Grey.

== Honours ==
Viceregal styles of The Earl of Gowrie
- Reference style: His Excellency
- Spoken style: Your Excellency

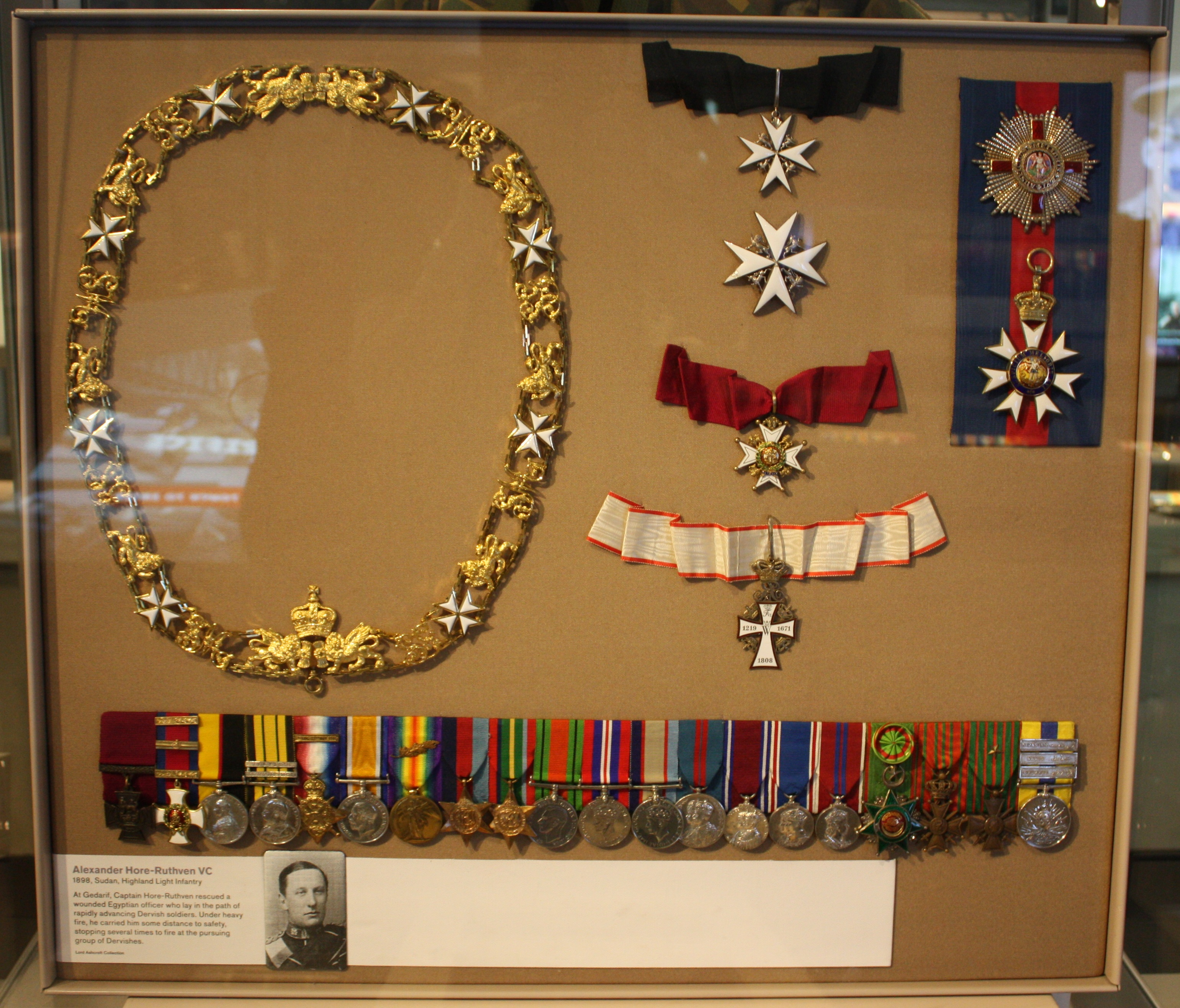
Hore-Ruthven's orders, medals and decorations on display in the Ashcroft Gallery at the Imperial War Museum

| Victoria Cross (VC) | 1899 |
| Knight Grand Cross of the Order of St Michael and St George (GCMG) | 1935 |
| Knight Commander of the Order of St Michael and St George (KCMG) | 1928 |
| Companion of the Order of St Michael and St George (CMG) | 1918 |
| Companion of the Order of the Bath (CB) | 1919 |
| Companion & Bar of the Distinguished Service Order (DSO & Bar) | 1916, 1919 |
| Knight of Grace of the Venerable Order of St John of Jerusalem | |
| Queen's Sudan Medal | |
| Africa General Service Medal with two Clasps | |
| 1914 Star with Clasp | |
| British War Medal | |
| Victory Medal with MID Palm | |
| 1939–45 Star | |
| Pacific Star | |
| Defence Medal | |
| War Medal 1939–1945 | |
| Australia Service Medal 1939–45 | |
| 1911 Delhi Durbar Medal | 1911 |
| King George V Silver Jubilee Medal | 1935 |
| King George VI Coronation Medal | 1937 |
| Queen Elizabeth II Coronation Medal | 1953 |
| Order of Osmanieh, 4th Class | |
| Belgian Croix de guerre | |
| French Croix de guerre 1914–1918 with Bronze star | |
| Khedive's Sudan Medal with three Clasps | Khalifa |
| Commander of the Order of the Dannebrog | |

== See also ==
- County of Hore-Ruthven

Government offices
| Preceded by Sir George Bridges | Governor of South Australia; 1928–1934 | Succeeded by Sir Winston Joseph Dugan |
| Preceded by Sir Philip Game | Governor of New South Wales; 1935–1936 | Succeeded by Sir David Anderson |
| Preceded by Sir Isaac Isaacs | Governor-General of Australia; 1936–1945 | Succeeded by The Duke of Gloucester |
Peerage of the United Kingdom
| New title | Earl of Gowrie; 1945–1955 | Succeeded by Grey Ruthven |
| New title | Baron Gowrie; 1935–1955 | Succeeded by Grey Ruthven |
Military offices
| Preceded by Charles James Briggs | Colonel of 1st King's Dragoon Guards; 1940–1945 | Succeeded by Sidney Howes |
