= Earl of Gowrie =

Earldom in the Peerage of the United Kingdom

Earldom of Gowrie
- Paly of six argent and gules
- Creation date: 23 August 1581 (Original creation)
- Created by: James VI Scotland
- First holder: William Ruthven, 1st Earl of Gowrie
- Present holder: 1581 creation: 20th Lord Ruthven, 16th Earl of Gowrie 1945 creation: Patrick Hore-Ruthven, (3rd Earl of Gowrie)
- Motto: Deid schaw ("Show a deed")

Earl of Gowrie is a title that has been created twice, once in the Peerage of Scotland and once in the Peerage of the United Kingdom, both times for members of the Ruthven family. It takes its name from Gowrie, a historical region and ancient province of Scotland. On 23 August 1581, William Ruthven, 4th Lord Ruthven, was created Earl of Gowrie by James VI, King of the Scots. He was executed for high treason, attainted and his peerages forfeited on 28 May 1584. Two years later in 1586, the attainder was reversed and his son, the second Earl, was restored as Earl of Gowrie and Lord Ruthven, but both peerages were forfeited after the alleged plot and subsequent death of the second Earl's younger brother, the third Earl, in 1600.

The Ruthven family descended from Sir William Ruthven, who was created Lord Ruthven in the Peerage of Scotland in 1488. Lord Ruthven's son and heir, William Ruthven, Master of Ruthven, was one of the many Scottish nobles killed at the Battle of Flodden in 1513. Lord Ruthven died in 1528 and was succeeded by his grandson, William, the second Lord, the son of the Master of Ruthven. The second Lord was an Extraordinary Lord of Session and Keeper of the Privy Seal of Scotland. He was succeeded by his son, Patrick, the third Lord. Patrick was the leader of the band which murdered David Rizzio. After the murder he fled to England where he died in 1566. He was succeeded by his son, William, the aforementioned fourth Lord, who was created Earl of Gowrie in 1581 (see above).

Thomas Ruthven, grandson of Alexander Ruthven of Freeland, younger son of the second Lord Ruthven, was created Lord Ruthven of Freeland in 1651. His descendant Walter Hore-Ruthven, 9th Lord Ruthven of Freeland, was created Baron Ruthven of Gowrie, of Gowrie in the County of Perth, in the Peerage of the United Kingdom in 1919. He was succeeded by his eldest son, Walter, the tenth Lord and former major general in the British Army. On the latter's death in 1956 the Scottish lordship of Parliament devolved on his daughter, Bridget Helen Monckton, 11th Lady Ruthven, while the barony of Ruthven of Gowrie created in 1919 (which could only descend through male lines) devolved on his great-nephew, Grey Ruthven, 2nd Earl of Gowrie, who became the third Baron. Lord Gowrie was the grandson of the Honourable Alexander Hore-Ruthven, Governor-General of Australia between 1936 and 1945 and the second son of the ninth Lord Ruthven of Freeland. Alexander Hore-Ruthven had been elevated to the Peerage of the United Kingdom as Baron Gowrie, of Canberra in the Commonwealth of Australia and of Dirleton in the County of East Lothian, in December 1935. In January 1945 he was further honoured when he was made Viscount Ruthven of Canberra, of Dirleton in the County of East Lothian, and Earl of Gowrie in the Peerage of the United Kingdom, a revival of the earldom created for his kinsman in the 16th century. The latter's grandson, the second Earl, elder son of the Honourable Patrick Hore-Ruthven, only surviving son of the first Earl, succeeded in May 1955. He notably served in the Conservative administrations under Margaret Thatcher in the 1980s. However, he lost his seat in the House of Lords after the passage of the House of Lords Act 1999. As of 2021, the titles are held by his son, the 3rd Earl, who succeeded in that year. Lord Gowrie is also Chief of the Name and Arms of Ruthven. The Earl is in remainder to the lordship of Ruthven of Freeland (now held by the Earl of Carlisle).

Several other members of the Ruthven family may also be mentioned. Alexander Ruthven, third son of the first Earl of the first creation, took part in the Gowrie conspiracy of 1600, was condemned for treason and hanged, drawn and quartered. Patrick Ruthven, 1st Earl of Brentford, was the grandson of William Ruthven, younger son of the first Lord Ruthven. Sir John Ruthven, nephew of the Earl of Brentford, was a Major-General in the Swedish Army. His son, Francis Ruthven, was created a Baronet in 1666 (see Ruthven Baronets). The Honourable Malise Ruthven, younger brother of the second Earl of Gowrie of the second creation, is a writer and historian.

Arms of the Earls of Gowrie (first creation)

== Coat of arms ==
The coat of arms of the first Gowrie earldom (1581 creation) was: "quarterly, 1st and 4th, paly of six argent and gules (Ruthven); 2nd, barry of six or and gules (Cameron of Balledgarno); 3rd, Or, on a bend azure, three mascles or (Halyburton of Dirleton); all within a bordure or, charged with a double tressure flory counterflory gules."

The coat of arms of the Earl of Gowrie (1945 creation) is: "Paly of six argent and gules. Crest: A Ram's Head couped Sable, armed Or. Supporters: Dexter: a Ram Sable, gorged with a Coronet and chained Or. Sinister: a Goat Sable, gorged with a Coronet and chained Or. Motto: Deid Shaw"

== Lords Ruthven (1488) ==
- William Ruthven, 1st Lord Ruthven (d. 1528)
- William Ruthven, 2nd Lord Ruthven (d. 1552)
- Patrick Ruthven, 3rd Lord Ruthven (c. 1520–1566)
- William Ruthven, 4th Lord Ruthven (d. 1584) (created Earl of Gowrie in 1581)

== Earls of Gowrie (1581) ==
- William Ruthven, 1st Earl of Gowrie (c. 1545–1584) (forfeit 1584)
- James Ruthven, 2nd Earl of Gowrie (1575–1588)
- John Ruthven, 3rd Earl of Gowrie (1576–1600)

== Earls of Gowrie (1945) ==
- Alexander Hore-Ruthven, 1st Earl of Gowrie (1872–1955)
- (Alexander Patrick) Greysteil Ruthven, 2nd Earl of Gowrie (1939–2021)
- (Patrick Leo) Brer Ruthven, 3rd Earl of Gowrie (b. 1964)

== Present peer ==
Patrick Leo Brer Hore-Ruthven, 3rd Earl of Gowrie (born 4 February 1964) is the son of the 2nd Earl and his wife Alexandra Bingley. Styled formally from birth as Viscount Ruthven of Canberra, in 2003 he was operations director of Camphor Ltd.

In February 1990, Ruthven married Julie Goldsmith, and they have a son, Heathcote Patrick Cornelius Hore-Ruthven, Viscount Ruthven of Canberra (born 1990), heir apparent.

On 24 September 2021, Ruthven succeeded his father as Earl of Gowrie (1945), Viscount Ruthven of Canberra (1945), Baron Ruthven of Gowrie (1919), and Baron Gowrie of Canberra (1935).

== Line of succession ==
- Alexander Hore-Ruthven, 1st Earl of Gowrie (1872–1955)
  - Major Hon. Alexander Hardinge Patrick Hore-Ruthven (1913–1942)
    - (Alexander Patrick) Greysteil Ruthven, 2nd Earl of Gowrie (1939–2021)
      - (Patrick Leo) Brer Ruthven, 3rd Earl of Gowrie (born 1964)
        - (1) Heathcote Patrick Cornelius Hore-Ruthven, Viscount Ruthven of Canberra (b. 1990)
    - (2) Malise Walter Maitland Knox Hore-Ruthven (b. 1942)

== See also ==
- Lord Ruthven (disambiguation)
- Lord Ruthven of Freeland
- Earl of Brentford
- Clan Ruthven
- Scone Abbey
- Scone Palace
