= Ruthven =

Ruthven may refer to:

== Places ==
=== Scotland ===
- Ruthven, Aberdeenshire, a village
- Ruthven, Angus, a village
  - Ruthven Castle, Angus
- Ruthven, Badenoch, Highland
  - Ruthven Barracks, Highland
- Ruthven Castle (disambiguation)
- Loch Ruthven, nature reserve to the south west of Inverness
- Aberuthven, a village in Perth and Kinross

=== Australia ===
- Ruthven Mansions, heritage-listed building in Adelaide, South Australia
- Ruthven railway station, Melbourne, Victoria
- Ruthven, New South Wales, an area in the City of Lismore

=== Elsewhere ===
- Ruthven, Iowa, US
- Ruthven, part of Kingsville, Ontario, Canada
- Ruthven Bluff, Antarctica

== People ==
- Clan Ruthven, a Scottish clan
- Baron Ruthven of Gowrie, a title in the Peerage of the United Kingdom
- Lord Ruthven (disambiguation), a title in the peerage of Scotland and several people

=== Surname ===
- Alexander Ruthven (1580–1600), Scottish nobleman
- Alexander Grant Ruthven (1882–1971), American herpetologist and President of the University of Michigan
- Allan Ruthven (1922–2003), Australian rules footballer
- David Ruthven, 2nd Lord Ruthven of Freeland (died 1701), Lord High Treasurer of Scotland
- Dick Ruthven (born 1951), American baseball player
- Edward Southwell Ruthven (c. 1772–1836), Irish Repealer politician and British MP
- Grey Ruthven, 2nd Earl of Gowrie (1939–2021), known as Grey Gowrie, British politician
- John Ruthven (disambiguation), several people
- Lady Jane Ruthven (died 1668), Swedish lady in waiting of Scottish descent to queen Christina of Sweden
- Malise Ruthven (born 1942), Scottish writer and historian
- Margaret Ruthven Lang (1867–1972), American composer
- Michelle Ruthven (born 1967), Canadian alpine skier
- Patrick Ruthven (disambiguation), several people
- Thomas Ruthven, 1st Lord Ruthven of Freeland (died 1671), Scottish nobleman
- Tyler Ruthven (born 1988), American soccer player
- William Ruthven (disambiguation), several people

=== Given name ===
- Ruthven Frederic Ruthven-Smith, London investor who funded Ruthven Mansions in Adelaide, South Australia
- Ruthven Todd (1914–1978), Scottish poet, artist and novelist
- Ruthven Wade (1920–2001), Royal Air Force officer, Vice-Chief of the Air Staff

== Fictional characters ==
- Lord Ruthven (vampire), a fictional vampire character
- Sir Ruthven Murgatroyd, the male lead in the Gilbert and Sullivan operetta Ruddigore

== See also ==
- Raid of Ruthven, a 1582 political conspiracy in Scotland
- Rathven, a village in Moray, Scotland
- Ruthven Road railway station, a station in Perthshire, Scotland which served Ruthven House between 1859 and 1951
