= Lord Ruthven =

Lord Ruthven may refer to:

== People ==
=== Lord Ruthven ===
- Lord Ruthven, a title in the peerage of Scotland from 1488, used until 1581 on the creation of Earl of Gowrie
  - William Ruthven, 1st Lord Ruthven (d. 1528)
  - William Ruthven, 2nd Lord Ruthven (d. 1552)
  - Patrick Ruthven, 3rd Lord Ruthven (c. 1520–1566)
  - William Ruthven, 1st Earl of Gowrie, 4th Lord Ruthven, (d. 1584), created Earl of Gowrie in 1581

=== Lord Ruthven of Freeland and Baron Ruthven of Gowrie ===
- Lord Ruthven of Freeland, a title in the peerage of Scotland since 1651
  - Thomas Ruthven, 1st Lord Ruthven of Freeland (died 1671), Scottish nobleman
  - David Ruthven, 2nd Lord Ruthven of Freeland (died 1701), Lord High Treasurer of Scotland
  - James Ruthven, 7th Lord Ruthven of Freeland (1777–1853)
  - Walter Hore-Ruthven, 9th Lord Ruthven of Freeland (1838–1921), created Baron Ruthven of Gowrie in 1919
  - Walter Hore-Ruthven, 10th Lord Ruthven of Freeland, 2nd Baron Ruthven of Gowrie (1870–1956), British Major-General
  - Bridget Monckton, 11th Lady Ruthven of Freeland, Viscountess Monckton of Brenchley (1896–1982)
  - Charles Howard, 12th Earl of Carlisle, 12th Lord Ruthven of Freeland (1923–1994)
  - George Howard, 13th Earl of Carlisle, 13th Lord Ruthven of Freeland (born 1949)

=== Lord Ruthven of Ettrick ===
- Patrick Ruthven, 1st Earl of Forth (c. 1573–1651)

=== Viscount Ruthven of Canberra ===
- Alexander Hore-Ruthven, 1st Earl of Gowrie, also created Viscount Ruthven of Canberra in 1944
- Viscount Ruthven of Canberra, now a courtesy title of the heir apparent of the Earl of Gowrie
  - Grey Ruthven, 2nd Earl of Gowrie (born 1939), known as Lord Ruthven until 1955
    - Brer Ruthven, Viscount Ruthven of Canberra (b. 1964), his son

== Fictional characters ==
- Lord Ruthven (vampire), a fictional character
- Lord de Ruthven, a fictional character in the 1816 Gothic novel Glenarvon, by Lady Caroline Lamb
