= Hore-Ruthven =

Hore-Ruthven is a surname. Notable people with the surname include:

- Alexander Hore-Ruthven, 1st Earl of Gowrie (1872–1955), British soldier and Governor-General of Australia
- Alexander Patrick Greysteil Hore-Ruthven, 2nd Earl of Gowrie (1939–2021), Irish-born British politician and businessman
- Alison Mary Hore-Ruthven (1902–1974), British socialite, daughter of Walter Hore-Ruthven, 10th Lord Ruthven, twin sister of Margaret
- Bridget Hore-Ruthven (1896-1982), later Bridget Monckton, 11th Lady Ruthven of Freeland
- Malise Walter Maitland Knox Hore-Ruthven (born 1942), Anglo-Irish academic and writer
- Margaret Leslie Hore-Ruthven (1901–1970), British socialite, daughter of Walter Hore-Ruthven, 10th Lord Ruthven, twin sister of Alison
- Patrick Hore-Ruthven (1913–1942), British soldier and poet, son of Alexander and Zara Hore-Ruthven
- Walter Hore-Ruthven, 1st Baron Ruthven of Gowrie (1838–1921), British soldier and member of the House of Lords
- Walter Hore-Ruthven, 10th Lord Ruthven of Freeland (1870–1956), British major-general
- Zara Hore-Ruthven, Countess of Gowrie (1879–1965), wife of the 1st Earl of Gowrie, Governor of South Australia
