= William Ruthven =

William Ruthven may refer to:

- William Ruthven, 1st Lord Ruthven (died 1513)
- William Ruthven, 2nd Lord Ruthven (died 1552)
- William Ruthven, 1st Earl of Gowrie (c.1541–1584), known as the Lord Ruthven 1566–1581
- William Ruthven (Australian soldier) (1893–1970), Australian soldier and politician

== See also ==
- Ruthven (disambiguation)
- William Ruthven Smith (1868–1941), an American soldier
