= Countess of Carlisle =

Countess of Carlisle may refer to:

- Lucy Hay, Countess of Carlisle (1599–1660)
- Rosalind Howard, Countess of Carlisle (1845–1921)
- Bridget Monckton, 11th Lady Ruthven of Freeland (1896–1982)
