= The Book of Beauty =

1930 collection of photographs by Cecil Beaton

The Book of Beauty is a 1930 book by Cecil Beaton, his first published book of photographs. In his concept of beauty, Beaton, with sketches and photographs, highlights actresses such as Tallulah Bankhead and Anna May Wong but also modernist literary figures like Edith Sitwell and Nancy Cunard.

== Contents ==
- Lillie Langtry
- Lily Elsie
- Gaby Deslys
- Gina Palerme
- Mary Curzon, Lady Howe
- The Morgan Sisters (Thelma Furness, Viscountess Furness and Gloria Morgan Vanderbilt)
- Gladys Cooper
- Rosamond Pinchot
- Lady Diana Abdy
- The Beaton Sisters (Nancy Beaton and Baba Beaton)
- The Jungman Sisters (Zita Jungman and Baby Jungman)
- Edith Sitwell
- Virginia Woolf
- Hazel Lavery
- Tallulah Bankhead
- The French Sisters (Essex French and Valerie French)
- Lillian Gish
- Marion Davies
- Norma Shearer
- Alice White
- Greta Garbo
- Irene Castle
- Gertrude Lawrence
- Lady Eleanor Smith and Lady Pamela Smith
- Hon. Daisy Fellowes
- Tilly Losch
- Vicomtess Alice de Janzé
- Marjorie Oelrichs
- Mrs Gordon Beckles Wilson
- Mona Williams
- The Ruthven Twins (Alison Ruthven and Peggy Ruthven)
- Paula Gellibrand, Marquise de Casa Maury
- Nada Ruffer and Clarita de Uriburu
- Freda Dudley Ward
- Anita Loos
- Adele Astaire
- Lady Nancy Cunard
- Lady Sylvia Ashley
- Lady Diana Cooper

== Gallery ==
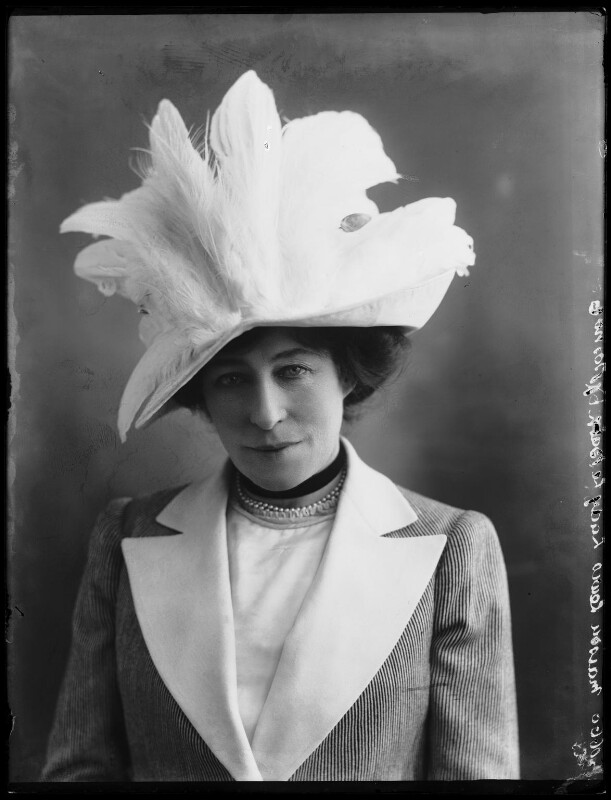
Lillie Langtry

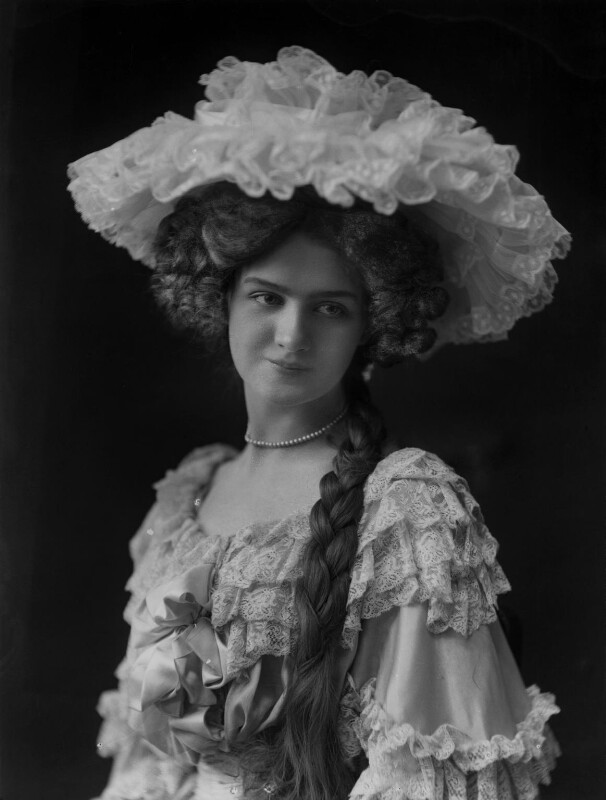
Lily Elsie

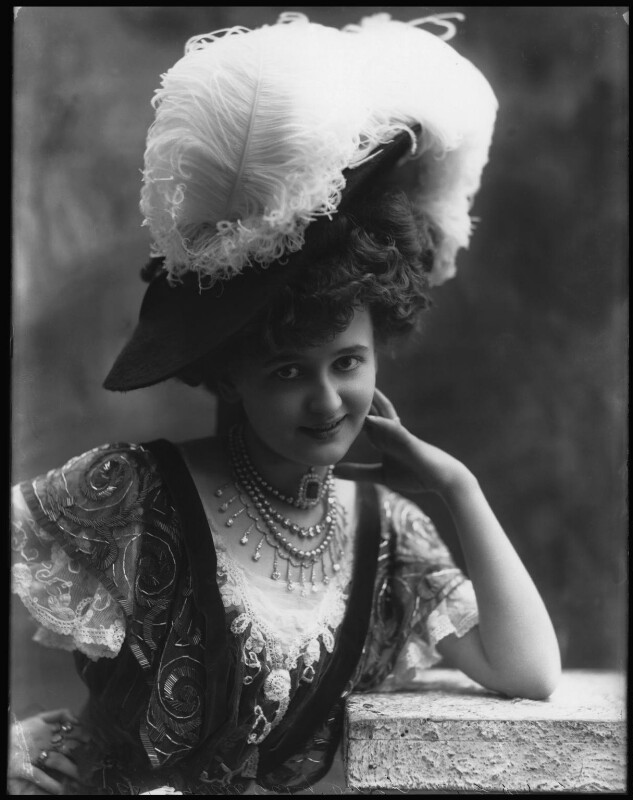
Gaby Deslys

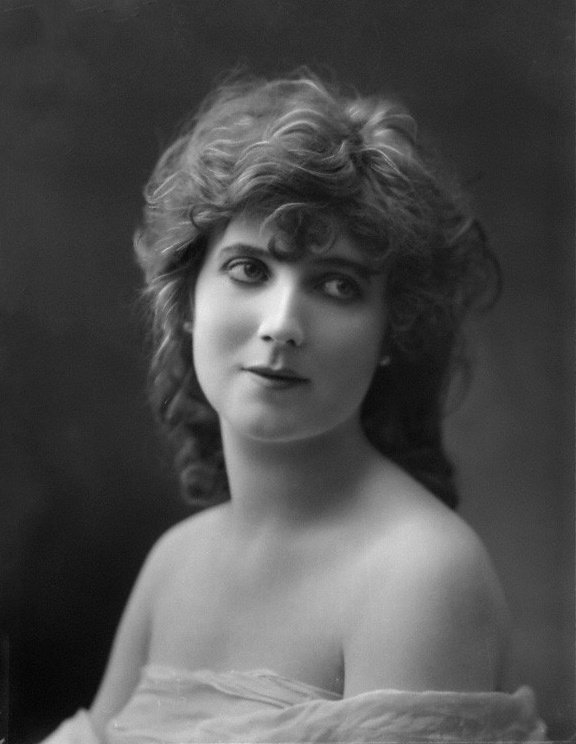
Gina Palerme

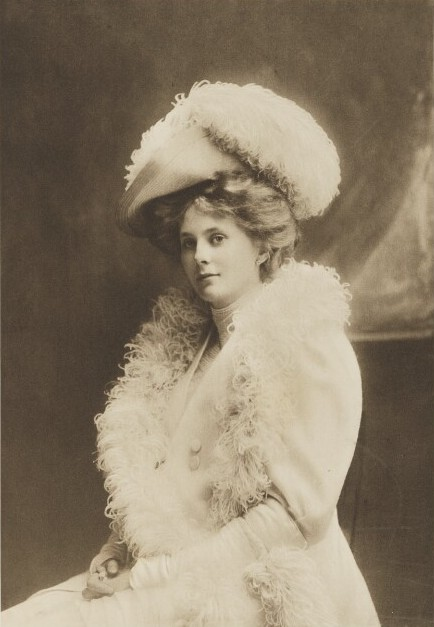
Mary Curzon, Lady Howe

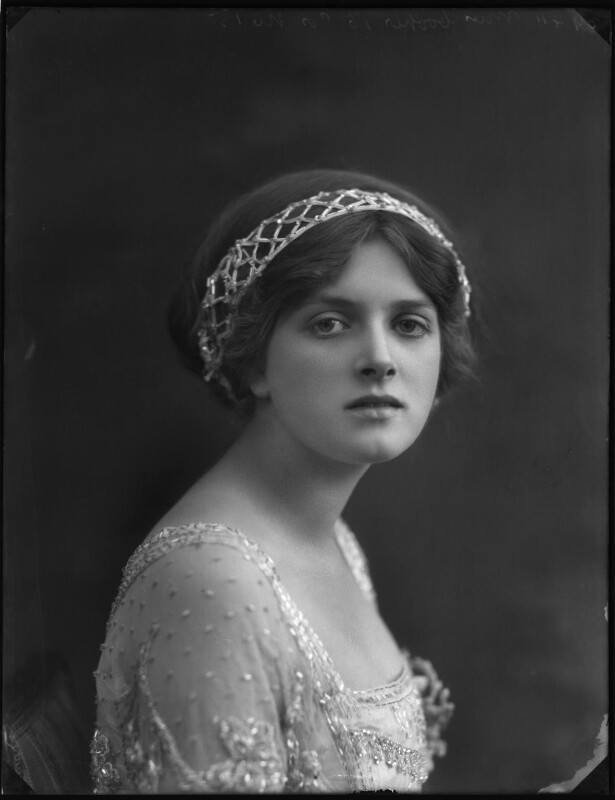
Gladys Cooper

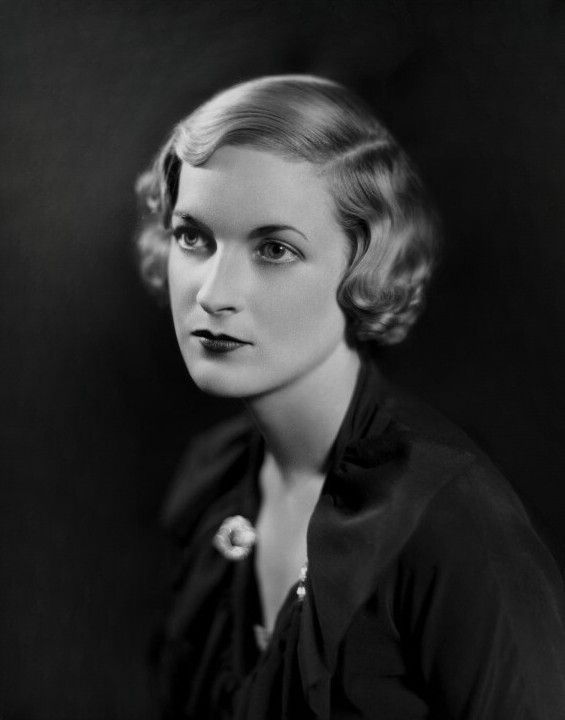
Valerie French

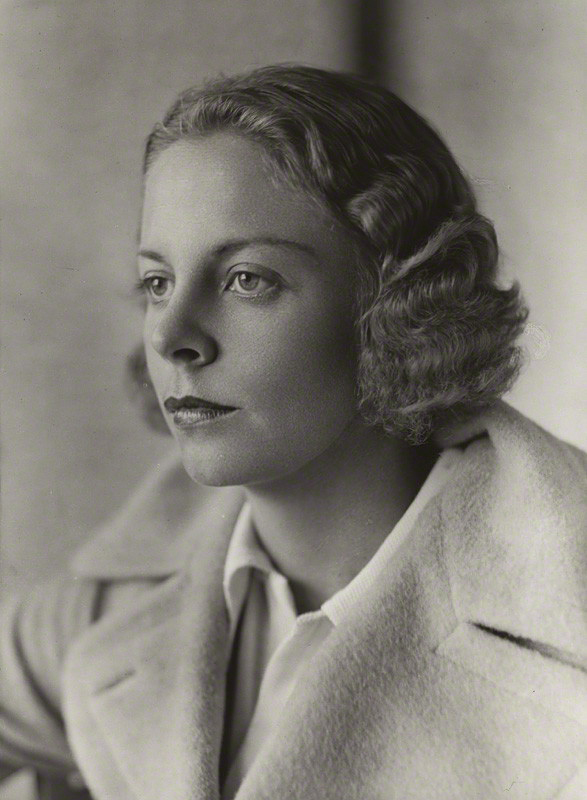
Alice White

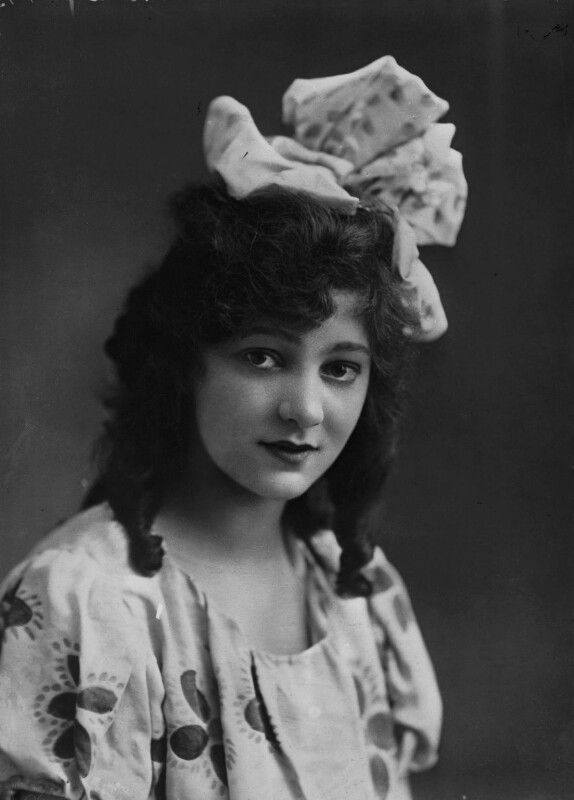
Gertrude Lawrence

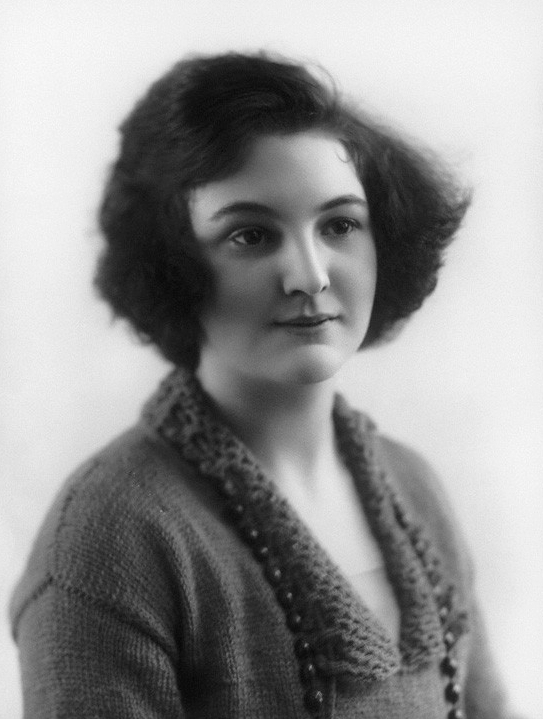
Eleanor Smith

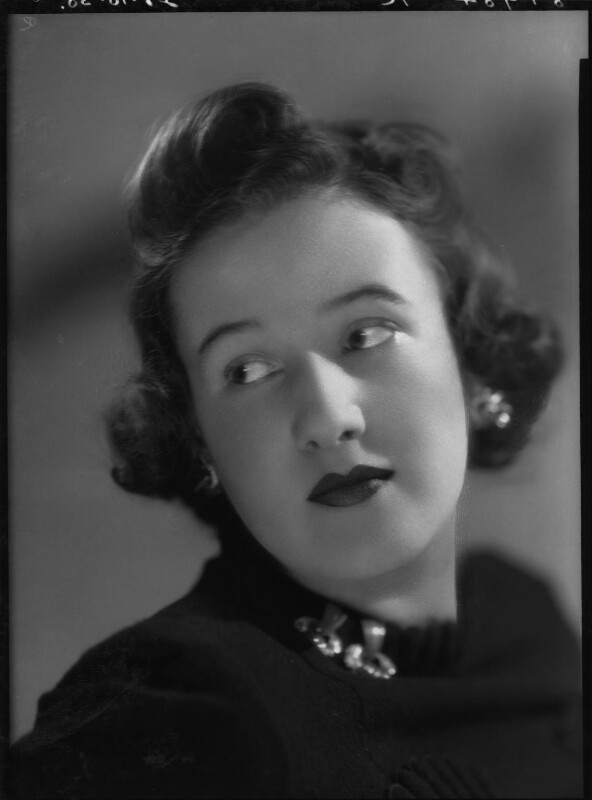
Pamela Smith

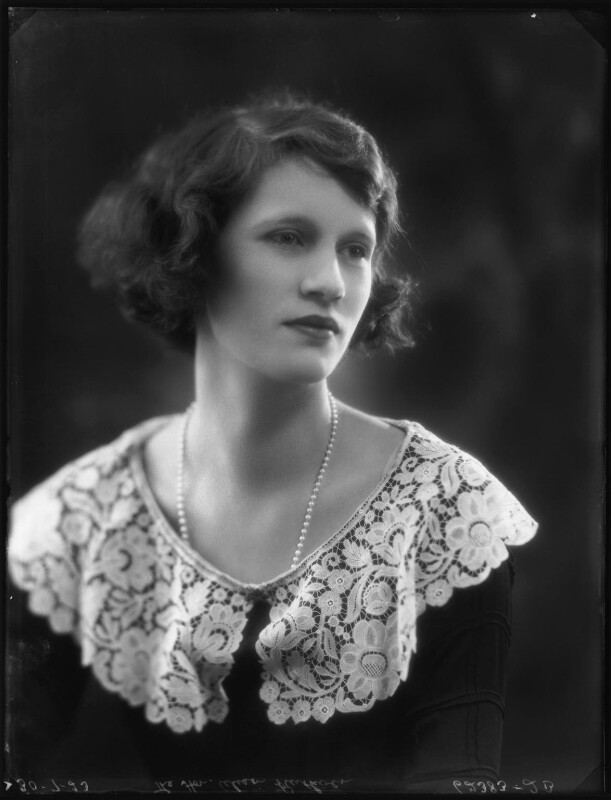
Alison Ruthven

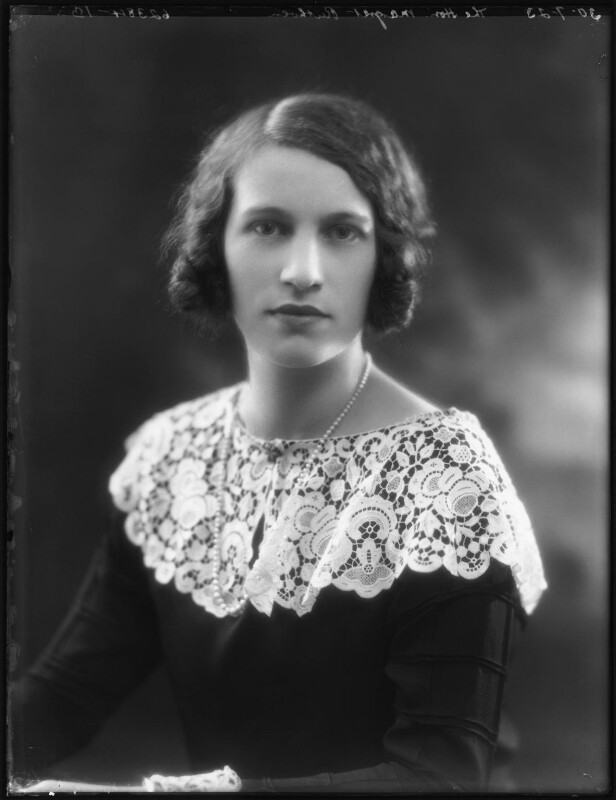
Peggy Ruthven

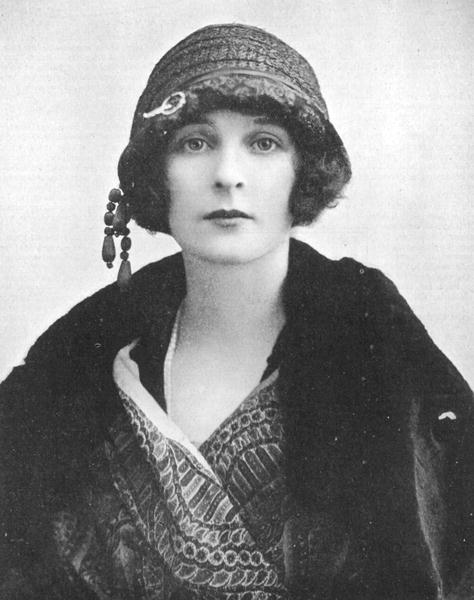
Freda Dudley Ward
