= Clan Ruthven =

Lowland Scottish clan

- Motto: Deid schaw

Chief
- Brer Ruthven
- The 3rd Earl of Gowrie
- Historic seat: Huntingtower Castle
Septs of Clan Ruthven
Gowrie, Rothven, Rothveyn, Rothwen, Ruthen, Ruthfen, Ruthven, Ruffin, Ruthwein, Ruthyn, Rythven
Clan branches
Ruthven of Gowrie (chiefs)
Ruthven of Freeland
Allied clans
Clan Moncreiffe
Rival clans
Clan Charteris

The Clan Ruthven (/ˈrɪvən/) is a Lowland Scottish clan.

== History ==
=== Origins ===
The Ruthven lands in Perthshire, Scotland take their name from the Scottish Gaelic, Ruadhainn which means Dun uplands. The clan chief's family are of Norse origin. They first settled in East Lothian but by the end of the twelfth century they were in Perthshire.

Between 1188 and 1199, Swein is recorded as giving lands that included Tibbermore to the Monks of Scone. Swein's grandson was Sir Walter Ruthven who was the first to adopt the name Ruthven.

=== Wars of Scottish Independence ===
Sir Walter Ruthven swore fealty to Edward I of England in 1291 and 1296. However, in 1297, he had led thirty men to help William Wallace at the siege of Perth. Ruthven was also with Christopher Seaton when Jedburgh was reclaimed from the English. In 1313, Perth was recaptured and Robert the Bruce appointed Sir William Ruthven to be sheriff of the royal burgh, which was then called St Johnston.

=== 15th and 16th centuries ===
A descendant of Sir William Ruthven, Sir William Ruthven of Balkernoch, spent three years as a hostage in England for the ransom of James I of Scotland. This William Ruthven was a substantial nobleman. His income was stated to be about four hundred merks annually, which was about £100 at the time. In 1488, his great-grandson was created a Lord of Parliament with the title Lord Ruthven, by James III of Scotland. He married twice and his sons by his first wife were granted a letter of legitimization in 1480. The eldest of the sons was William, Master of Ruthven, who was killed at the Battle of Flodden in 1513.

==== Feud with Clan Charteris ====
The Charterises of Kinfauns are said to have received their lands as a reward for supporting Robert the Bruce against the English. However they came into a feud with the Ruthvens who often disputed the authority of the Charterises. The Ruthvens held considerable sway over Perth from their Huntingtower Castle. In 1544, Patrick, Lord Ruthven, was elected as Provost of Perth but at the intervention of Cardinal Beaton, Ruthven was deprived of the office and Charteris of Kinfauns was appointed instead. The city refused to acknowledge Charteris and barred the gates against him. Charteris along with Lord Gray and the Clan Leslie then attacked the town. However, they were repulsed by the Ruthvens, who were assisted by the Clan Moncreiffe. As a result, Ruthven remained Provost of Perth until 1584, when William Ruthven, Earl of Gowrie was executed. John Charteris had been killed by the earl's heir on Edinburgh High Street in 1552.

==== Murder of David Rizzio ====
In 1556, Patrick Ruthven, 3rd Lord Ruthven, and his son, William, were among the co-conspirators of Lord Darnley when Mary, Queen of Scot's favorite David Rizzio was killed in her presence at Holyrood Palace. Both Ruthvens fled to England when abandoned by Darnley. William returned and succeeded to the family title having received a royal pardon. He was among the people who conducted the queen to Lochleven Castle, where she was forced to abdicate. Ruthven was also the Treasurer of Scotland during the king's minority and in 1581 was created William Ruthven, 1st Earl of Gowrie.

==== Ruthven Raid ====
In 1582, Ruthven, now the Earl of Gowrie, abducted James VI of Scotland in order to remove him from the influence of the Earl of Lennox and Earl of Arran. This became known as the "Ruthven Raid" or Raid of Ruthven. The king was detained for ten months and, when he was finally released, he appeared forgiving but Gowrie was later arrested in 1584 and beheaded for treason.

==== Gowrie Conspiracy ====
In 1586, the Ruthven estates were restored to William's son, James Ruthven, 2nd Earl of Gowrie. However, James Ruthven died just two years later aged thirteen and was succeeded by his brother, John Ruthven, 3rd Earl of Gowrie. It is alleged that John practiced Black magic. In 1600, he and his brother Alexander were murdered in their town house in Perth. This became known as the "Gowrie Conspiracy". The Ruthven brothers were declared by Parliament to be traitors although there is little evidence, if anything, of what they were planning. The Ruthven name was decreed out of existence in Scotland, with all members of the family required to choose new surnames.

=== 17th century, Thirty Years' War and Civil War ===
In 1651, Sir Thomas Ruthven, who descended from the second Lord Ruthven, partly restored the family's reputation when he was raised in the peerage as Lord Ruthven of Freeland.

Patrick Ruthven, 1st Earl of Brentford (c. 1573–1651), was a collateral descendant of Sir William Ruthven, 1st Lord Ruthven. He fought and negotiated on behalf of Gustavus Adolphus of Sweden, King of Sweden, during the Thirty Years' War. In Germany, he fought alongside his nephews, Colonel Frances Ruthven and Major General John Ruthven.

Patrick Ruthven, 1st Earl of Brentford also fought on behalf of King Charles I during the Wars of the Three Kingdoms, bringing both Colonel Frances Ruthven and Major General John Ruthven into service with him. Sir Thomas Ruthven, 1st Lord Ruthven of Freeland (d. 1673), on whom Charles II of England bestowed the title of Lord Ruthven of Freeland in 1651. His son was David Ruthven, 2nd Lord Ruthven of Freeland.

=== 18th to 20th century ===
- David Ruthven, 2nd Lord Ruthven of Freeland, died unmarried in April, 1701. The title of Baroness Ruthven was assumed by his sister:
- Jean (d. 1722), although according to some authorities the peerage had become extinct. It was, however, assumed in 1722 by:
- William Cunynghame of Cunynghamhead (d. 1722) William was Lady Jean's nephew, her closest heir. William died in October of 1722 without an heir and was succeeded by his niece Lady Isobel:
- Isobel (d. 1732), wife of James Johnson, who took the name of Ruthven on succeeding to the family estates; and their son:
- James Ruthven (d. 1783), took the title and was allowed to vote at the elections of Scots representative peers. In 1853 the barony again descended to a female:
- Mary Elizabeth Thornton (c. 1784–1864), the wife of Walter Hore (d. 1878). She and her husband took the name of Hore-Ruthven, and the Ruthven arms, and their grandson:
- Walter James Hore-Ruthven (b. 1838), became the 8th baron in 1864. His second son:
- Alexander Hore-Ruthven, 1st Earl of Gowrie (1872–1955), through meritorious service (including as Governor-General of Australia), regained the family's peerage title (first as Baron Gowrie, 1934, and then as Earl of Gowrie in a new creation, 1944).

== Clan Chief ==
Clan Chief: (Patrick Leo) Brer Hore-Ruthven, 3rd Earl of Gowrie, Viscount Ruthven of Canberra, and Baron Ruthven of Gowrie, and Baron Gowrie of Canberra, Commonwealth of Australia, Chief of the Name and Arms of Ruthen, in succession to Grey Hore-Ruthven, who died 24 September 2021.

== Castles and palace ==
- Huntingtower Castle
- Dirleton Castle
- Scone Abbey
- Scone Palace
- Gowrie House
- Freeland House (now the main School House of Strathallan School)
- Trochrie Castle
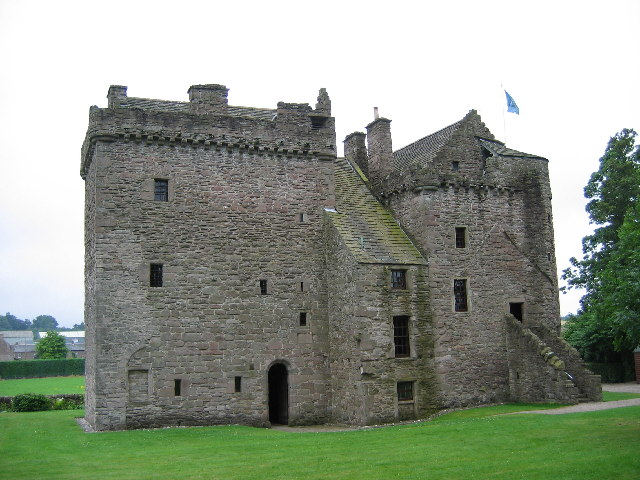
Huntingtower Castle

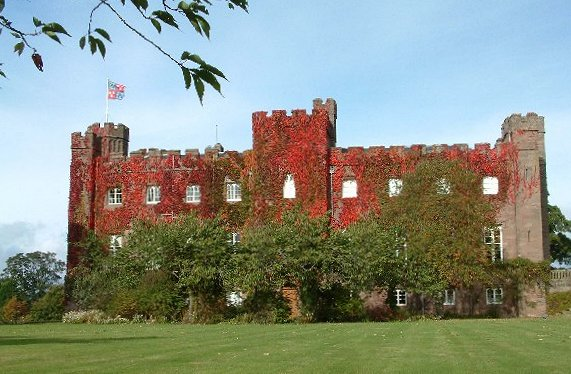
Scone Palace

== See also ==
- Lord Ruthven
- Earl of Gowrie
- Earl of Brentford
