= John Ruthven =

John Ruthven may refer to:

- John Ruthven, 3rd Earl of Gowrie (c.1577-1600), Scottish politician
- John A. Ruthven (1924–2020), American painter
- John Ruthven (general) (17th century), military officer in Denmark and Sweden
