= Patrick Ruthven =

Patrick Ruthven may refer to:

- Patrick Ruthven, 3rd Lord Ruthven (c. 1520–1566), Scottish politician
- Patrick Ruthven, 1st Earl of Forth (c. 1573–1651), Scottish general and diplomat

== See also ==
- Patrick Hore-Ruthven (1913–1942), British soldier and poet
- Ruthven (disambiguation)
