= Ruthven Castle =

Ruthven Castle may refer to the following places:

- Huntingtower Castle, in Perth, Scotland, originally called Ruthven Castle but was renamed Huntingtower Castle in 1600.
- Ruthven Castle, Angus, Scotland.
- Ruthven Barracks, Ruthven, Badenoch, Scotland, 18th-century military barracks built on the site of a castle called Ruthven.
