= Clarita de Uriburu =

Argentine socialite

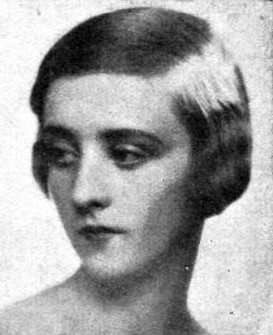
- c. 1930s
- Born: Clara Agustina de Uriburu Roca; 1 April 1908; Buenos Aires, Argentina
- Died: 22 April 1995 (aged 87); Buenos Aires, Argentina

Clara "Clarita" Agustina de Uriburu Roca (1 April 1908 – 22 April 1995) was an Argentine socialite included in The Book of Beauty by Cecil Beaton.

== Biography ==
Clara "Clarita" Agustina de Uriburu Roca was born on 1 April 1908 in Buenos Aires, Argentina, the daughter of José Evaristo de Uriburu Tezanos Pinto (1880-1956), Argentine Ambassador in London from 1927 to 1931, and Agustina Eloísa Roca Funes. Her grandfather was José Evaristo de Uriburu, President of Argentina from 23 January 1895 to 12 October 1898.

On 15 December 1938 she married Eduardo Cernadas Martel and had one son, Eduardo Cernadas Uriburu.

She died on 22 April 1995 in Buenos Aires, Argentina, and is buried at Cementerio de la Recoleta.
