= John Ruthven (general) =

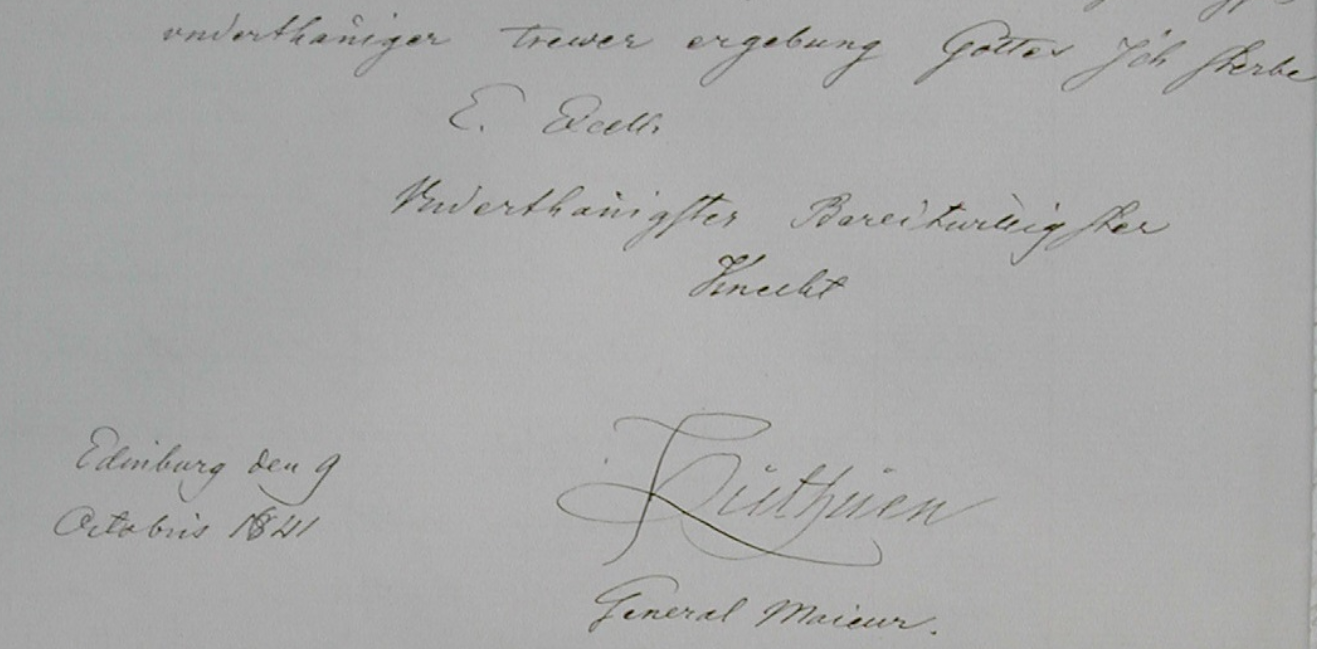
The Signature of Major General Ruthven, 1641

Sir John Ruthven (died c.1648) was a military officer who served in Denmark and Sweden during the Thirty Years' War before returning to the British Isles for brief service in the English Civil Wars.

Ruthven served first as a captain in Danish service from 1627. As Christian IV of Denmark made peace with the Habsburg Emperor in 1629, Ruthven, along with many other Scottish soldiers in Danish service, then turned to Sweden to continue the war. He first appears in Swedish service in 1629 serving as a captain of the Scottish infantry at Stralsund under the command of Alexander Leslie. He was soon promoted lieutenant-colonel in Leslie's infantry regiment (by 1630) and led an infantry regiment in the Battle of Breitenfeld on 17 September 1631 as full colonel. He later took part in the Battle of the Alte Veste near Nuernberg on 3 September 1632, and later took part in the bloody conquest of Landsberg/Lech (Bavaria) under the command of Lennart Torstensson.

Ruthven was promoted to major-general by 1636 and took part in the Battle of Wittstock as de facto commander of the reserve when Major General Vitzthum refused orders to advance. Evidence from eye-witness accounts by the generals show that this was John and not his uncle Patrick Ruthven as sometimes claimed. In 1638 he sought permission to leave Swedish service in order to return to Scotland to participate in the Bishops' Wars under his uncle's command. John Ruthven appears to have not taken part in any of the action in this conflict, but did hold the king's commission in his uncle's regiment. When the Civil Wars broke out in England in 1642, John Ruthven appears to have retired from service, and did not join his uncle's retinue in England. Ruthven was however involved with the merchant financier Robert Inglis in raising money for the Scottish army in 1643 as a loan from the Countess of Home.

He married Barbara Leslie, the eldest daughter of Alexander Leslie. In 1663, his son Francis Ruthven and his wife Elizabeth Ruthven (daughter of Thomas Ruthven, 1st Lord Ruthven of Freeland) had Isobell Ruthven, the future Lady of Freeland.

== See also ==
- Scotland and the Thirty Years' War
