= George Howard, 11th Earl of Carlisle =

British nobleman, politician and peer

Lieutenant-Commander The Right Honourable The Earl of Carlisle

Personal details
- Born: George Josslyn L'Estrange Howard; 6 January 1895
- Died: 17 February 1963 (aged 68) Dumfries, Scotland
- Spouses: Hon. Bridget Hore-Ruthven (m. 1918; div. 1947) Esme Mary Shrubb Iredell (m. 1947)
- Children: 3, including Charles Howard, 12th Earl of Carlisle
- Parent(s): Charles Howard, 10th Earl of Carlisle; Rhoda Ankaret L'Estrange

Lieutenant-Commander George Josslyn L'Estrange Howard, 11th Earl of Carlisle (6 January 1895 – 17 February 1963), styled Viscount Morpeth from 1911 to 1912, was a British nobleman, politician, and peer.

== Early life ==
George Josslyn L'Estrange Howard was born on 6 January 1895. He was the eldest child, and only son, of Charles Howard, 10th Earl of Carlisle and the former Rhoda Ankaret L'Estrange (1867–1957). His three younger sisters were Lady Constance Ankaret Howard, Lady Ankaret Cecilia Caroline Howard (wife of William Jackson, 7th Baronet), and Lady Elizabeth Henrietta Howard (wife of Lawrence Robert Maconochie-Welwood).

His mother was the eldest daughter of Col. Paget Walter L'Estrange and Emily (née Ryves) L'Estrange (a daughter of General Ryves). His paternal grandparents were George Howard, 9th Earl of Carlisle and the radical temperance campaigner, the former Hon. Rosalind Frances Stanley (fifth daughter of Edward Stanley, 2nd Baron Stanley of Alderley).

== Career ==
On 20 January 1912, he succeeded to the earldom of Carlisle upon the death of his father.

Lord Carlisle served in World War I as Lieutenant-Commander of the Royal Navy and was awarded the Croix de Guerre.

During World War II, he served as a director of the United Kingdom Commercial Corporation in Turkey. In 1947, he was a member of a London firm of stockbrokers.

== Personal life ==
On 17 January 1918, Lord Carlisle was married to his first wife, the Hon. Bridget Hore-Ruthven, the eldest of the four daughters of Major-General Walter Hore-Ruthven, 10th Lord Ruthven of Freeland and the former Jean Lampson. Together, they were the parents of two children:

- Lady Carolyn Bridget Dacre Howard (b. 1919), who served with the Auxiliary Territorial Service and First Aid Nursing Yeomanry during World War II.
- Charles James Ruthven Howard, Viscount Morpeth (1923–1994), later 12th Earl of Carlisle.

In June 1947, a divorce court in London granted a decree of divorce to Lord Carlisle against the Countess of Carlisle on the grounds of adultery with Sir Walter Monckton, whose wife at the same time obtained a similar decree. After their divorce, he married, secondly, on 16 August 1947 Esme Mary Shrubb Iredell (d. 1977), the second daughter of Dr. Charles Edward Iredell of London. They had one child:

- Lady Susan Ankaret Howard (1948–2018), who married (Charles) James Buchanan-Jardine, younger son of Sir John Buchanan-Jardine, 3rd Baronet in 1967. They divorced, and Lady Susan married Count Hubert Charles de Meyer, in 1978.

In 1948, an unfinished portrait of Georgiana Cavendish, Duchess of Devonshire by Sir Joshua Reynolds insured for £5,000 was "slit from its frame and stolen from the unoccupied London apartment of the Earl and Countess of Carlisle". The robbers also stole jewelry and other valuables from the residence while the Earl was on holiday at Naworth Castle, his country seat in Cumbria.

Lord Carlisle died on 17 February 1963 in Dumfries, Scotland, and was succeeded by his only son, Charles. Lady Carlisle died on 4 June 1977.

Peerage of England
Preceded by Charles Howard	Earl of Carlisle; 1912–1963	Succeeded by Charles Howard
