= Walter Hore-Ruthven, 10th Lord Ruthven of Freeland =

Scottish noble (1870–1956)

Major-General The Right Honourable The Lord Ruthven of Freeland CB CMG DSO
- Ruthven in 1917
- Born: 6 June 1870; Chelsea, London, England
- Died: 16 April 1956 (aged 85); Bath, Somerset, England
- Spouse: Jean Leslie Lampson
- Children: Bridget, Jean, Alison, and Margaret
- Relatives: Alexander Hore-Ruthven, 1st Earl of Gowrie (brother)
- Military career
- Allegiance: United Kingdom
- Branch: British Army
- Service years: 1887–1934
- Rank: Major-General
- Commands: London District (1924–1928); Bangalore Brigade (1920–1923); 1st Guards Brigade (1919); 120th Brigade (1918); 1st Battalion, Scots Guards (1914–1915)
- Conflicts: Second Boer War; First World War
- Awards: Companion of the Order of the Bath; Companion of the Order of St Michael and St George; Distinguished Service Order; Mentioned in Despatches (10)

Major-General Walter Patrick Hore-Ruthven, 10th Lord Ruthven of Freeland, 2nd Baron Ruthven of Gowrie, CB, CMG, DSO (6 June 1870 – 16 April 1956), known as the Master of Ruthven from 1870 to 1921, was a senior British Army officer. He served as Major-General commanding the Brigade of Guards and General Officer Commanding London District from 1924 to 1928, and was then Lieutenant Governor of Guernsey until 1934.

== Early life ==
Ruthven was born at 117, Sloane Street in Chelsea, London, the son of Walter James Hore-Ruthven, 9th Lord Ruthven of Freeland, 1st Baron Ruthven of Gowrie, and of his wife Lady Caroline Annesley Gore, a daughter of Philip Gore, 4th Earl of Arran. He was educated at Eton College.

== Military career ==
In June 1887, aged seventeen, Hore-Ruthven was commissioned as a second lieutenant into the 3rd (Militia) Battalion of the Argyll and Sutherland Highlanders. In August 1890 he was promoted to lieutenant.

On 25 July 1891 he transferred to regular service in the Scots Guards as a second lieutenant, was promoted to lieutenant on 12 February 1896 and, after being seconded for service on the staff in January 1898, served as an extra aide-de-camp to General Prince Arthur, Duke of Connaught and Strathearn from January 1898, before being made aide-de-camp in August. He was promoted from supernumerary lieutenant to lieutenant in October 1898 then to captain on 11 October 1899.

He served in the Second Boer War and took part in the Battle of Magersfontein on 10–11 December 1899, in which a defending Boer force defeated the advancing British forces with heavy casualties for the latter. He was mentioned in the despatch from Lord Methuen describing the battle. On 1 January 1902, he was appointed regimental adjutant of the Scots Guards.

In April 1906 he was promoted to major and in April 1908 he was made a deputy assistant adjutant general (DAAG) with a Territorial Force (TF) unit.

In February 1912 he succeeded Captain Charles Grant as brigade major of the 3rd Infantry Brigade, 1st Division.

Ruthven later served in the First World War, becoming a GSO1 in succession to Lieutenant Colonel William Thwaites in June 1915. In June 1916 he was promoted to brevet colonel.

He succeeded as 2nd Baron Ruthven of Gowrie and as 10th Lord Ruthven of Freeland in 1921.

After the war he became commander of the Bangalore Brigade in India and was promoted to substantive major general in January 1923. In 1924 he was appointed Major-General commanding the Brigade of Guards and general officer commanding (GOC) London District. In 1929, he was made lieutenant Governor of Guernsey. He retired in 1935.

== Personal life ==
In 1895, Ruthven married Jean Leslie Lampson, a granddaughter of Curtis Lampson, and they had four daughters:

- Bridget Helen Hore-Ruthven, 11th Lady Ruthven of Freeland (1896–1982); who married firstly George Howard, 11th Earl of Carlisle and later remarried Walter Monckton, 1st Viscount Monckton of Brenchley. With her first husband, she had three children:
- Hon Jean Elizabeth St. Loe Hore-Ruthven (1898–1960); married, no issue
- Hon Alison Mary Hore-Ruthven (1902–1974); married Commander Sir John Leighton Barran, 3rd Baronet, had issue
- Hon Margaret Leslie Hore-Ruthven (1902–1970); married Peter Llewelyn Davies, had issue

After Jean Lampson's death in 1952, Lord Ruthven remarried Judith Gordon Bell.

He died in 1956, aged 85, while visiting Bath, Somerset.

== Titles ==
Lord Ruthven's surname and title originated from his Irish great-grandfather Walter Hore's marriage to Scottish noblewoman Mary Ruthven, Lady Ruthven of Freeland. Walter legally changed his surname to Hore-Ruthven.

- The Master of Ruthven (1870–1921)
- Major General the Lord Ruthven of Freeland CB CMG DSO (1921–1956)

His eldest daughter, Bridget Monckton, 11th Lady Ruthven of Freeland, succeeded him in his more senior title as it was in the Peerage of Scotland and thus may be inherited by female descendants. It has been held since 1994 by his great-grandson George Howard, 13th Earl of Carlisle, grandson of Bridget Monckton, 11th Lady Ruthven of Freeland. The junior title Baron Ruthven of Gowrie, in the Peerage of the United Kingdom, may only pass through male descendants and was inherited by his younger brother's grandson, Grey Ruthven, 2nd Earl of Gowrie. It has been held since November 2021 by Lord Ruthven's great-great-nephew (Patrick Leo) Brer Ruthven, 3rd Earl of Gowrie.

Military offices
Preceded by Sir George Jeffreys	GOC London District; 1924–1928	Succeeded by Sir Charles Corkran
Government offices
Preceded by Sir Charles Sackville-West	Lieutenant Governor of Guernsey; 1929–1934	Succeeded by Sir Edward Broadbent
Peerage of Scotland
Preceded by Walter Hore-Ruthven	Lord Ruthven of Freeland; 1921–1956	Succeeded by Bridget Monckton
Peerage of the United Kingdom
Preceded by Walter Hore-Ruthven	Baron Ruthven of Gowrie; 1921–1956	Succeeded by Grey Ruthven
