= Sir Francis Ruthven, 1st Baronet =

Sir Francis Ruthven, 1st Baronet (circa 1604 – circa 1688) was a Scottish soldier.

Ruthven was the son of General Sir John Ruthven and Barbara Leslie. He joined his father in the Swedish Army, serving as an ensign in Herman Wrangel's Kronoberg regiment in 1623. He was promoted to captain in Otto von Scheiding's Småland regiment in 1626 and transferred to the regiment of his great-uncle, Patrick Ruthven, that year. In 1627 he became a captain in Kalmar regiment. Ruthven became a colonel in June 1631 and he was appointed Governor of Memell in 1633 during its occupation by Swedish forces. He left Swedish service in 1639.

He was a Royalist and likely returned to Scotland before or during the Civil War, but is not recorded as playing any role in the conflict. On 11 July 1666 he was created a baronet, of Redcastle in the Baronetage of Nova Scotia. Ruthven's title became extinct upon his death without male heirs.

Ruthven married Elizabeth, second daughter of Thomas Ruthven, 1st Lord Ruthven of Freeland, by whom he had one daughter, Isobel. Isobel later inherited the estate and title of her grandfather.

Baronetage of Nova Scotia
New creation	Baronet (of Redcastle); 1666-c.1688	Extinct
