= James Ruthven, 7th Lord Ruthven of Freeland =

James Ruthven, Baron Ruthven FRSE (1777–1853) was a 19th-century Scottish peer and professional soldier.

== Life ==
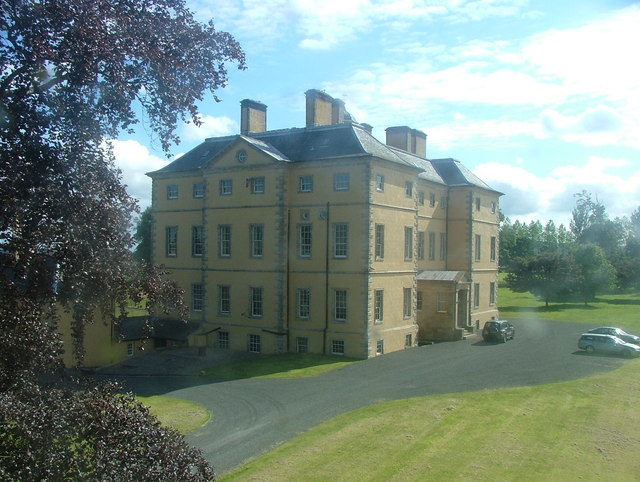
Melville House

He was born at Melville House south of Monimail near Cupar in Fife on 17 October 1777. He was the eldest son of James Ruthven, 6th Lord Ruthven of Freeland and his wife, Lady Mary Elizabeth Leslie. He succeeded his father as 7th Lord Ruthven of Freeland in 1789.

Until 1807 he was a Major in the 90th Regiment of Foot also known as the Perthshire Volunteers.

In 1825 he was elected a Fellow of the Royal Society of Edinburgh his proposer being Sir Thomas Dick Lauder.

He died on 27 July 1853.

== Family ==
In 1813 he married Mary Hamilton Campbell of Shawfield. They had no children.

== See also ==
- Lord Ruthven of Freeland

Peerage of Scotland
Preceded by James Ruthven	Lord Ruthven of Freeland; 1789–1853	Succeeded by Mary Hore-Ruthven
