= Lord Ruthven of Freeland =

Title in the peerage of Scotland

- Creation: 1651
- Created by: Charles II
- Peerage: Peerage of Scotland
- First holder: Thomas Ruthven
- Present holder: George Howard, 13th Earl of Carlisle, 13th Lord Ruthven of Freeland
- Heir apparent: Heirs general
- Heir presumptive: Hon. Philip Howard
- Status: Extant
- Former seats: Newlandburn House, Midlothian; Harperstown Castle, Co. Wexford
- Motto: DEED SHAW (Deed Shows)
- Arms: Paly of six, argent and gules
- Crest: A ram's head, couped argent, horned or
- Supporters: Dexter, a ram proper; sinister, a goat proper

Lord Ruthven of Freeland (pronounced Rivven) is a title in the Peerage of Scotland. It was created in 1651 for Thomas Ruthven. He was the grandson of Alexander Ruthven, younger son of William Ruthven, 2nd Lord Ruthven (see the Earl of Gowrie, 1581 creation, for earlier history of the family). The letters patent creating the peerage is said to have been burnt with the House of Freeland in 1750, and the remainder to the peerage is not accurately known. However, as the dignity was retained on the Union Roll, it has been presumed that the honour was to heirs-general.

Lord Ruthven of Freeland was succeeded by his son, the second Lord. He never married and on his death in 1722 the title and estates devolved by entail upon his youngest sister, Jean. On her death the estates passed to her nephew Sir William Cunningham, 3rd Baronet, of Cunninghamhead. He was the only son of Anne, elder sister of the third Lady Ruthven and also heir of line. He assumed the surname of Ruthven upon the death of his aunt, but lived only six months after his accession to the estates and never assumed the title.

As he was childless the title was passed on to his cousin Isabella Ruthven, the fourth holder. She was the daughter of the Hon. Elizabeth Ruthven, second daughter of first Lord, by her marriage with Sir Francis Ruthven, 1st Baronet, of Redcastle. She married James Johnston of Graitney, who along with his wife assumed the surname of Ruthven in lieu of Johnston. Isabella was summoned as a Lady to the Coronation of King George II and recognised in the lordship of Ruthven of Freeland. Her great-grandson (the title having descended in the direct line), the seventh Lord, died childless. He was succeeded by his younger sister Mary Elizabeth, the eighth holder of the titles. She was the wife of Walter Hore and they later assumed the additional family surname of Ruthven after that of Hore. Her grandson, the ninth Lord, was a Lieutenant-Colonel in the Rifle Brigade and fought at an early age in the Crimean War as well as in the First World War (although then in his seventies). In 1919 he was created Baron Ruthven of Gowrie, of Gowrie in the County of Perth, in the Peerage of the United Kingdom, which gave him an automatic seat in the House of Lords.

His second son the Hon. Alexander Hore-Ruthven served as Governor-General of Australia and was created Earl of Gowrie in 1945. Lord Ruthven of Freeland was succeeded by his eldest son, the tenth Lord. He was a Major-General in the Scots Guards. He died without male issue and was succeeded in the barony of Ruthven of Gowrie by his great-nephew Grey Ruthven, 2nd Earl of Gowrie (see the Earl of Gowrie for further history of the barony). The lordship of Ruthven of Freeland, which could be passed on through female lines, was inherited by his eldest daughter, Bridget, the eleventh holder. Her petition as heir of line and heir tailzie of the first Lord was allowed in the Lyon Court in 1967. She married firstly George Josslyn L'Estrange Howard, 11th Earl of Carlisle, and secondly Sir Walter Monckton. On her death in 1982 the title passed to her son from her first marriage, the twelfth Lord, who had already succeeded his father as twelfth Earl of Carlisle. For further history of the lordship, see the Earl of Carlisle.

== Lords Ruthven of Freeland (1651) ==
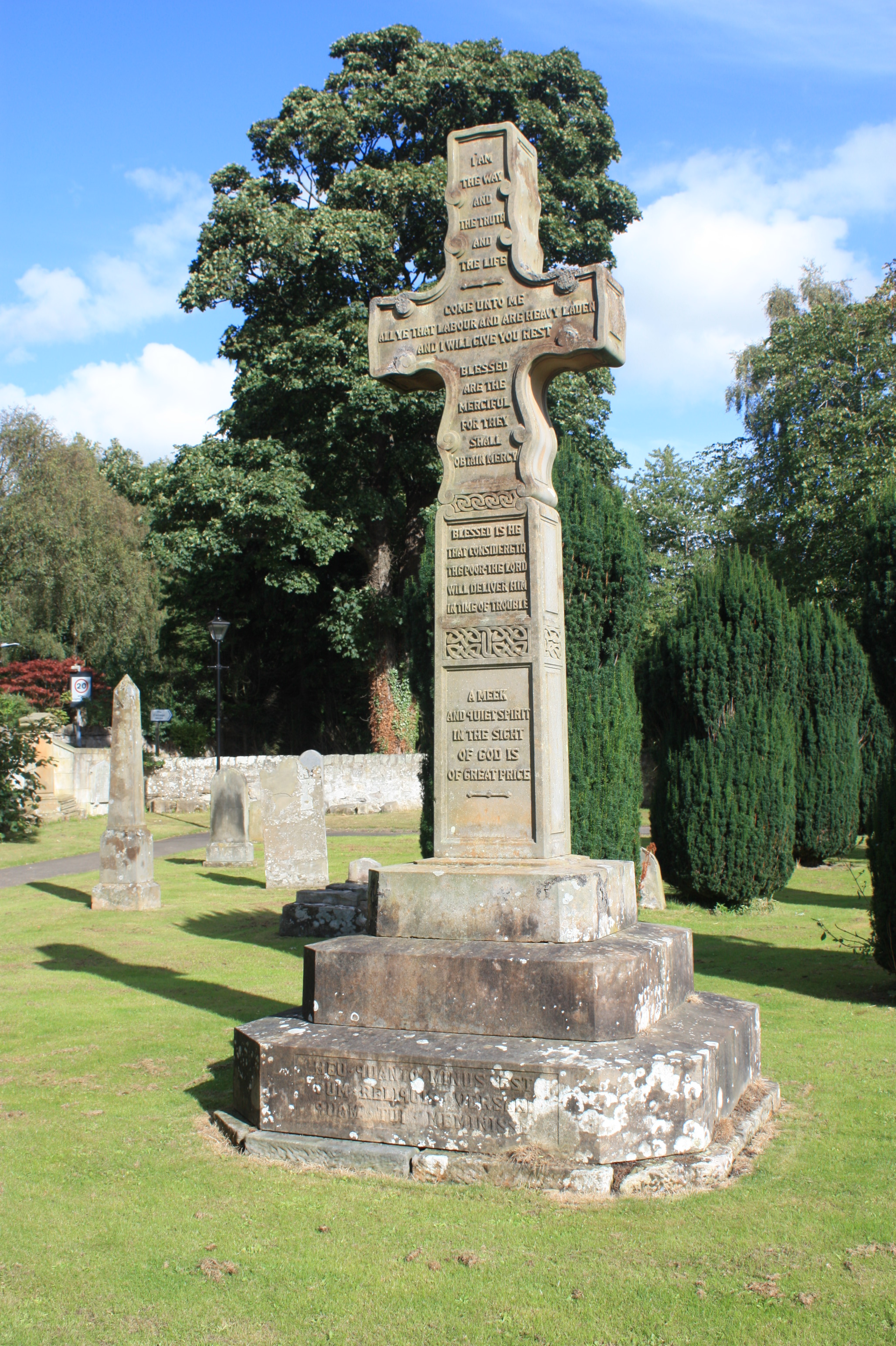
Monument to James, Lord Ruthven 1777-1853, Pencaitland

- Thomas Ruthven, 1st Lord Ruthven of Freeland (d. 1673)
- David Ruthven, 2nd Lord Ruthven of Freeland (d. 1701)

The Complete Peerage considers that on the death of the 2nd Lord Ruthven, unmarried, the peerage became extinct, but notes that nonetheless it was assumed, first by the heir of entail of his estates, and later by the heirs of line. It traces these soi-disant barons in an appendix. Thus the first person in the list below which it recognizes as a peer is Walter Hore-Ruthven, who was created 1st Baron Ruthven of Gowrie in the Peerage of the United Kingdom.

- Jean Ruthven, 3rd Lady Ruthven of Freeland (d. 1722)
- Isobel Ruthven, 4th Lady Ruthven of Freeland (d. 1732)
- James Ruthven, 5th Lord Ruthven of Freeland (d. 1783)
- James Ruthven, 6th Lord Ruthven of Freeland (1733–1789)
- James Ruthven, 7th Lord Ruthven of Freeland (1777–1853)
- Mary Elizabeth Thornton Hore-Ruthven, 8th Lady Ruthven of Freeland (c. 1784–1864)
- Walter James Hore-Ruthven, 9th Lord Ruthven of Freeland, 1st Baron Ruthven of Gowrie (1838–1921)
- Walter Patrick Hore-Ruthven, 10th Lord Ruthven of Freeland, 2nd Baron Ruthven of Gowrie (1870–1956)
- Bridget Helen Monckton, 11th Lady Ruthven of Freeland (1896–1982)
- Charles James Ruthven Howard, 12th Earl of Carlisle, 12th Lord Ruthven of Freeland (1923–1994)
- George William Beaumont Howard, 13th Earl of Carlisle, 13th Lord Ruthven of Freeland (b. 1949)

The heir presumptive is the present Earl's younger brother, The Hon Philip Charles Wentworth Howard (b. 1963).

== See also ==
- Earl of Gowrie
- Baron Ruthven of Gowrie
