= Walter Hore-Ruthven, 1st Baron Ruthven of Gowrie =

British soldier and peer

Walter James Hore-Ruthven, 9th Lord Ruthven of Freeland, 1st Baron Ruthven of Gowrie (14 June 1838 – 28 February 1921), previously known as Walter James Hore, was a British soldier and peer, a member of the House of Lords from 1919 until his death.

The son of William Hore and Dells Honoria Lowen, in 1853 his surname may have been changed to Hore-Ruthven by his paternal grandparents making this change to theirs.

Commissioned into the British Army, Hore-Ruthven saw active service in the Crimean War of 1853 to 1856 and eventually rose to the rank of Lieutenant-Colonel in the Rifle Brigade.

On 13 February 1864, on the death of his grandmother Mary Elizabeth Thornton Hore-Ruthven, 8th Lady Ruthven of Freeland (c. 1784–1864), Ruthven succeeded her as the 9th Lord Ruthven of Freeland in the peerage of Scotland, but was not recognized as such.

On 22 December 1865, as Baron Ruthven of Freeland and as the Heir of Entail in possession of the entailed lands of Freeland, Forteviot, Meikle Kinnaird, and other estates in Perthshire, Ruthven lodged a petition with the Court of Session to challenge the Will of his grandmother. She had left an annuity of £1,500 a year to her husband, Ruthven’s grandfather, and he asked for that to be reduced to £494, or one third of the income of the estates. He also challenged bequests totalling £9,000 to his grandmother’s younger children, which he believed she had not had the power to give, and asked for them to be reduced to £3,491.

In February 1869, Ruthven petitioned the Court of Session for authority to charge his entailed estates in Perthshire with the sum of £27,000. In October 1870, Ruthven was of the Pavilion House, Hans Place, Knightsbridge, and a bankruptcy action was brought against him by Henry Russell of 2, Percy Street, Bedford Square. In December 1873, he applied to the Court of Session for authority to sell his entailed estates, for the payment of debts.

On 23 October 1878, as "Walter James Hore, Lord Ruthven, late Captain, Rifle Brigade", he was commissioned as a major into the 15th Middlesex Rifle Volunteer Corps, a unit of the Volunteer Force.

In September 1881, Ruthven was "of Yeo Vale in the parish of Alwington, in the county of Devon", and sought a liquidation of his debts by arrangement. Notice was given of a first general meeting of his creditors at 11, New Inn, the Strand, London, on 7 October.

In December 1881, Ruthven was declared bankrupt, owing a total of £3,387. In 1882, George Boyle, 6th Earl of Glasgow, as Lord Clerk Register of Scotland, denied the existence of the lordship of Ruthven of Freeland before a Select Committee.

Ruthven was a Justice of the Peace for Herefordshire, Lanarkshire, and Perthshire, and also a Deputy Lieutenant of Perthshire.

In the First World War, at the age of 76 he returned to the Rifle Brigade and saw active service as a King's Messenger.

On 28 October 1919 Ruthven was created 1st Baron Ruthven of Gowrie, of Gowrie, Perthshire, in the peerage of the United Kingdom, giving him a seat in the House of Lords.

== Personal life ==
On 21 August 1869, at St George's, Hanover Square, Ruthven married Lady Caroline Annesley Gore, a daughter of Philip Yorke Gore, 4th Earl of Arran, of the Aran Islands, and of Elizabeth Marianne Napier. They had five children:

- Walter Patrick Hore-Ruthven, later a Major General and 2nd Baron Ruthven of Gowrie (1870–1956)
- Beatrice Mary Leslie Hore-Ruthven (1871–1930)
- Alexander Gore Arkwright Hore-Ruthven, 1st Earl of Gowrie (1872–1955), tenth Governor-General of Australia
- Christian Malise Hore-Ruthven (1880–1969)
- Philip James Leslie Hore-Ruthven (1882–1908)

Dying on 28 February 1921, Ruthven was buried as Walter James Hore Hore-Ruthven in the Dean Cemetery at Edinburgh.

== Honours ==
- Grand Officer, Order of the Crown of Belgium, 1915
