= Charles Howard, 12th Earl of Carlisle =

English nobleman, politician and peer

The Right Honourable The Earl of Carlisle
- Earl of Carlisle in 1966

Personal details
- Born: 21 February 1923
- Died: 28 November 1994 (aged 71)
- Spouse: Ela Beaumont (m. 1945)
- Children: 4, including George
- Parents: George Howard (father); Bridget Monckton (mother)

Charles James Ruthven Howard, 12th Earl of Carlisle, 12th Lord Ruthven of Freeland MC (21 February 1923 – 28 November 1994), styled Viscount Morpeth until 1963, was an English nobleman, politician, and peer.

== Background and education ==
Lord Carlisle was the only son of George Howard, 11th Earl of Carlisle and Bridget Monckton, 11th Lady Ruthven of Freeland. He was educated at Eton College. He succeeded his father in the earldom in 1963 and his mother in the lordship of Ruthven of Freeland in 1982.

== Family ==
Lord Carlisle married the Honourable Ela Helen Aline (1925–2002), daughter of Wentworth Beaumont, 2nd Viscount Allendale and Violet Lucy Emily Seely, daughter of Sir Charles Seely, 2nd Baronet, on 3 October 1945. They had four children:

- Lady Jane Howard (b. 28 February 1947)
- George William Beaumont Howard, 13th Earl of Carlisle (b. 15 February 1949)
- Lady Emma Howard (b. 20 July 1952)
- Hon. Philip Charles Wentworth Howard (b. 25 March 1963)

Peerage of England
Preceded by George Howard	Earl of Carlisle; 1963–1994	Succeeded by George Howard
Peerage of Scotland
Preceded by Bridget Monckton	Lord Ruthven of Freeland; 1982–1994	Succeeded by George Howard
