= Earl of Carlisle =

Title in the Peerage of England

Earldom of Carlisle
- Blazon Arms: Quarterly of six, 1st (Howard), Gules, a Bend between six Crosses-Crosslet finchée Argent; on the bend an Escutcheon Ar, charged with a Demi-Lion pierced through the mouth with an arrow, within a Double Tressure flory counterflory, all Gules, and above the escutcheon a Mullet sable for difference; 2nd (Thomas of Brotherton), Gules, three Lions passant guardant Or, and a label of three-points Argent; 3rd (Warrenne, Earl of Surrey), Chequy Or and Azure, 4th (Mowbray, Duke of Norfolk), Gules, a Lion rampant Argent; 5th (Dacre), Gules, three Escallops Argent; 6th (Greystock), Barry of six Argent and Azure, three Chaplets of Roses proper. Crest: On a Chapeau Gules, turned up Ermine, a Lion statant guardant with tail extended Or, ducally gorged Argent, charged on the shoulder with a Mullet for difference. Supporters: Dexter: A Lion Argent, charged on the shoulder with a Mullet for difference. Sinister: A Bull Gules, armed unguled and ducally gorged and lined Or.
- Creation date: 25 March 1322 (first creation); 13 September 1622 (second creation); 30 April 1661 (third creation)
- Created by: Edward II (first creation); James I (second creation); Charles II (third creation)
- Peerage: Peerage of England
- First holder: Andrew Harclay, 1st Earl of Carlisle (first creation); Charles Howard, 1st Earl of Carlisle (third creation)
- Present holder: George Howard, 13th Earl of Carlisle
- Heir presumptive: The Hon. Philip Howard
- Subsidiary titles: Viscount Howard of Morpeth; Baron Dacre of Gillesland; Lord Ruthven of Freeland
- Extinction date: 3 March 1323 (first creation); 30 October 1660 (second creation)
- Seat: Naworth Castle
- Former seat: Castle Howard (now held by a cadet branch of the family)
- Motto: VOLO NON VALEO (I am willing, but not able)

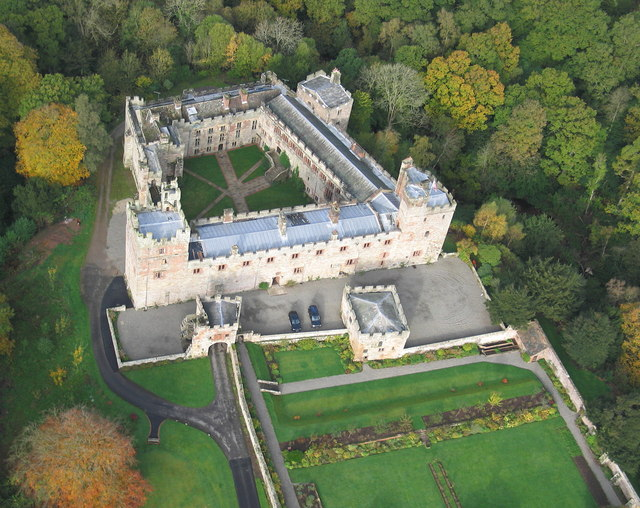
Naworth Castle in Cumbria

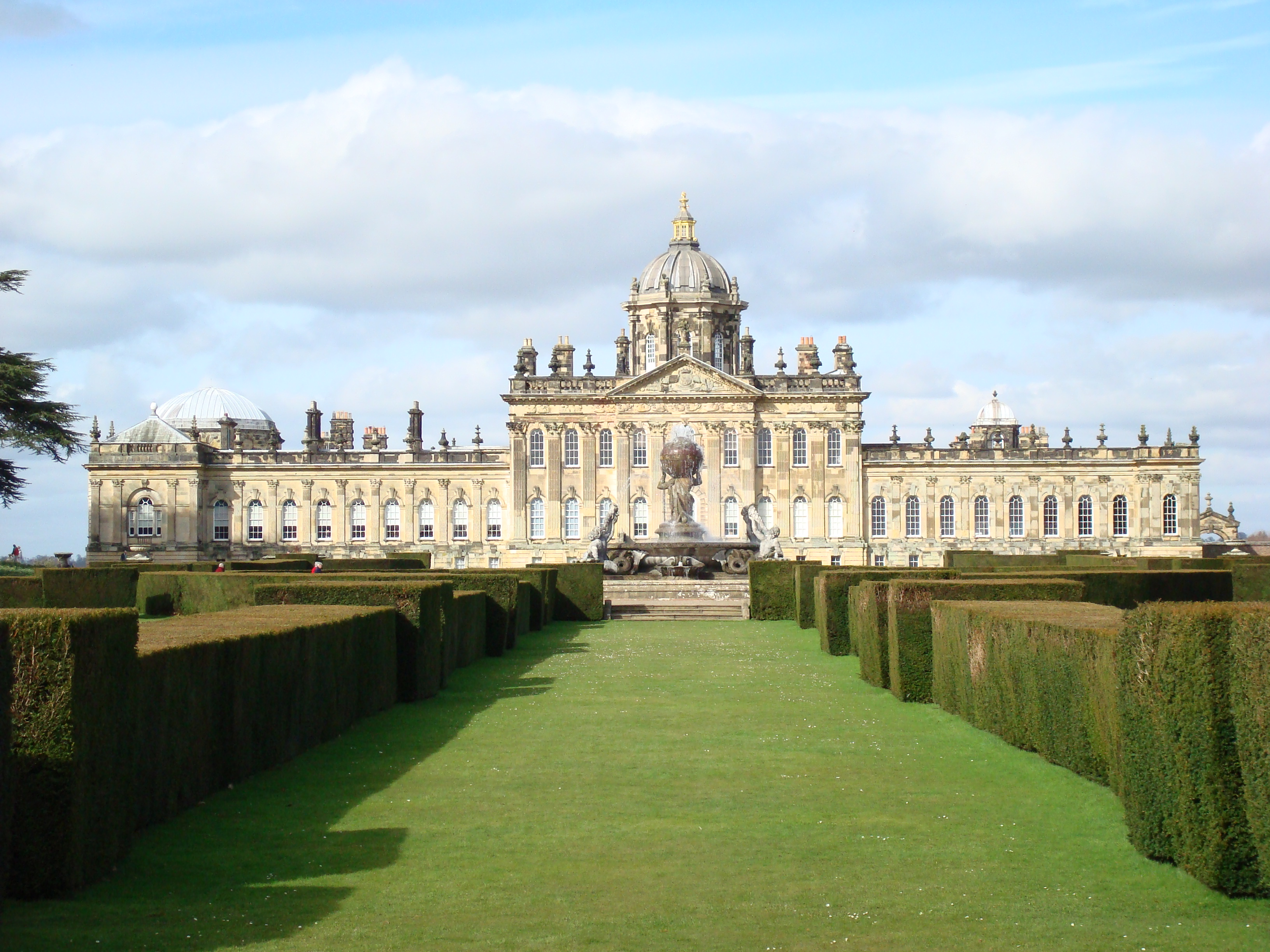
Castle Howard in North Yorkshire, the former seat of the Howard Earls of Carlisle

Earl of Carlisle is a title that has been created three times in the Peerage of England.

== History ==
The first creation came in 1322, when Andrew Harclay, 1st Baron Harclay, was made Earl of Carlisle. He had already been summoned to Parliament as Lord Harclay (or Lord Harcla) in 1321. However, Lord Carlisle was executed for treason in 1323, with his titles forfeited.

The second creation came in 1622, when James Hay, 1st Viscount Doncaster, was made Earl of Carlisle. He was a great favourite of James I and had already been created Lord Hay in the Peerage of Scotland in 1606, as well as Baron Hay, of Sawley in the County of York, and Viscount Doncaster in 1618. The latter titles were in the Peerage of England. Lord Carlisle was the member of a junior branch of the Hay family, headed by the Earl of Erroll. He was succeeded by his second but only surviving son, the second Earl. In 1637, he also succeeded his maternal grandfather, Charles Goring, 2nd Earl of Norwich, as second Baron Denny (a title created by writ in 1604; see Earl of Norwich). However, Carlisle was childless and on his death in 1660, all the titles became extinct.

The third creation came in 1660, when Sir Charles Howard was made Baron Dacre of Gillesland, in the County of Cumberland, Viscount Howard of Morpeth, in the County of Northumberland, and Earl of Carlisle. A member of the prominent Howard family, he was the great-grandson of Lord William Howard, third son of Thomas Howard, 4th Duke of Norfolk. Lord William Howard's wife was Elizabeth Dacre, youngest daughter of Thomas Dacre, 4th Baron Dacre (of Gillesland), a title which had fallen into abeyance on the death of the fifth Baron in 1569. Through this marriage, Naworth Castle and Henderskelfe Castle (which later became the site of Castle Howard) came into the Howard family. Lord Carlisle had earlier supported the Parliamentarian cause in the Civil War, and he is supposed to have been created Baron Gilsland and Viscount Howard of Morpeth by Oliver Cromwell in 1657 (it is certain that he was summoned to Cromwell's House of Lords the same year as "Lord Viscount Howard").

He was succeeded by his eldest son, the second Earl. He represented Morpeth, Cumberland and Carlisle in the House of Commons and served as Lord Lieutenant of Cumberland. On his death, the titles passed to his son, the third Earl. He was a prominent statesman and served as First Lord of the Treasury from 1701 to 1702, and in 1715. His third but eldest surviving son, the fourth Earl, sat as Member of Parliament for Morpeth. He was succeeded by his eldest son from his second marriage, the fifth Earl. He was an influential politician and held office as First Lord of Trade, as Lord Lieutenant of Ireland, as Lord Steward of the Household and as Lord Privy Seal.

His eldest son, the sixth Earl, also gained political prominence. He served as First Commissioner of Woods and Forests and as Lord Privy Seal, and was Minister without Portfolio between 1830 and 1834 in the famous Whig government of Lord Grey. He was succeeded by his eldest son, the seventh Earl. He was a noted politician and served as Chief Secretary for Ireland, as Chancellor of the Duchy of Lancaster and as Lord Lieutenant of Ireland. He never married and was succeeded by his younger brother, the eighth Earl. He was a clergyman and served as Rector of Londesborough in Yorkshire. He also died unmarried and was succeeded by his nephew, the ninth Earl. He was the son of the Hon. Charles Wentworth George Howard, fifth son of the sixth Earl. He represented Cumberland East in Parliament as a Liberal and was also a well-regarded painter.

His eldest son, the tenth Earl, was Liberal Unionist Member of Parliament for Birmingham South. He was succeeded by his only son, the eleventh Earl. He married as his first wife Bridget Helen Monckton, 11th Lady Ruthven of Freeland (see Lord Ruthven of Freeland for earlier history of this title). On his death in 1963, the titles passed to his only son, the twelfth Earl. In 1982, he also succeeded his mother as twelfth Lord Ruthven of Freeland. As of 2020, the peerages are held by his eldest son, the thirteenth Earl, who succeeded in 1994. Lord Carlisle unsuccessfully contested Easington in the 1987 general election and Leeds West in the 1992 general election.

Several other members of this branch of the Howard family have gained distinction. The Hon. Sir Charles Howard, fourth son of the third Earl, was a general in the Army and also represented Carlisle in the House of Commons for many years. Charles Howard, Viscount Morpeth, eldest son of the fourth Earl from his first marriage, briefly represented Yorkshire before his early death from tuberculosis. The Hon. Frederick Howard, third son of the fifth Earl, was a major in the 10th Hussars and fought at the Battle of Waterloo in 1815, where he was killed in action. His eldest son Frederick John Howard was Member of Parliament for Youghal. The Very Reverend the Hon. Henry Edward John Howard, fourth son of the fifth Earl, was Dean of Lichfield. His third son Edward Henry Howard was a vice-admiral in the Navy.

Admiral the Hon. Edward Granville George Howard, fourth son of the sixth Earl, was created Baron Lanerton in 1874. The aforementioned the Hon. Charles Wentworth George Howard, fifth son of the sixth Earl, represented East Cumberland in Parliament for almost forty years. Lady Harriet Howard, third daughter of the sixth Earl, was the wife of George Sutherland-Leveson-Gower, 2nd Duke of Sutherland. She was Mistress of the Robes to Queen Victoria and an active Whig in society circles. The Hon. Geoffrey William Algernon Howard, fifth son of the ninth Earl, was a Liberal Member of Parliament. His second son was George Howard, Baron Howard of Henderskelfe.

The heir apparent to the earldom, when one exists, is styled Viscount Morpeth.

The principal family seat today is Naworth Castle, while Castle Howard is now held by a cadet branch of the family.

== Earls of Carlisle, first creation (1322) ==
- Andrew Harclay, 1st Earl of Carlisle (died 1323) (forfeit 1323)

== Earls of Carlisle, second creation (1622) ==
- James Hay, 1st Earl of Carlisle (c. 1590–1636)
- James Hay, 2nd Earl of Carlisle (1612–1660) (extinct)

== Earls of Carlisle, third creation (1661) ==
- Charles Howard, 1st Earl of Carlisle (1629–1685)
- Edward Howard, 2nd Earl of Carlisle (1646–1692); eldest son of the 1st Earl
- Charles Howard, 3rd Earl of Carlisle (1669–1738); eldest son of the 2nd Earl
- Henry Howard, 4th Earl of Carlisle (1694–1758); eldest son of the 3rd Earl
  - Hon. Charles Howard, Viscount Morpeth (1719–1741); eldest son of the 4th Earl
  - Hon. Robert Howard, Viscount Morpeth (1725/6–1743); 2nd son of the 4th Earl
- Frederick Howard, 5th Earl of Carlisle (1748–1825); youngest son of the 4th Earl
- George Howard, 6th Earl of Carlisle (1773–1848); eldest son of the 5th Earl
- George William Frederick Howard, 7th Earl of Carlisle (1802–1864); eldest son of the 6th Earl
  - Hon. Frederick George Howard; 2nd son of the 6th Earl
- William George Howard, 8th Earl of Carlisle (1808–1889); 3rd son of the 6th Earl
  - Hon. Edward Granville George Howard, 1st and last Baron Lanerton (1809–1880); 4th son of the 6th Earl
  - Hon. Charles Wentworth George Howard (1814–1879); 5th son of the 6th Earl
- George James Howard, 9th Earl of Carlisle (1843–1911); son of Hon. Charles Wentworth George Howard, nephew of the 8th Earl and grandson of the 6th Earl
- Charles James Stanley Howard, 10th Earl of Carlisle (1867–1912); eldest son of the 9th Earl
- George Josslyn L'Estrange Howard, 11th Earl of Carlisle (1895–1963); eldest son of the 10th Earl
- Charles James Ruthven Howard, 12th Earl of Carlisle (1923–1994); eldest son of the 11th Earl
- George William Beaumont Howard, 13th Earl of Carlisle (born 1949); eldest son of the 12th Earl

The heir presumptive is the present holder's brother, the Hon. Philip Charles Wentworth Howard (born 1963).
The heir presumptive's heir apparent is his only son, William Philip Alexander Howard (born 1994).

== Line of succession (simplified) ==
Line of succession (simplified)
- Frederick Howard, 5th Earl of Carlisle (1748–1825)
  - George Howard, 6th Earl of Carlisle (1773–1848)
    - Hon. Charles Wentworth George Howard (1814–1879)
      - George James Howard, 9th Earl of Carlisle (1843–1911)
        - Charles James Stanley Howard, 10th Earl of Carlisle (1867–1912)
          - Lt Cdr. George Josslyn L'Estrange Howard, 11th Earl of Carlisle (1895–1963)
            - Charles James Ruthven Howard, 12th Earl of Carlisle (1923–1994)
              - George William Beaumont Howard, 13th Earl of Carlisle (b. 1949)
              - (1) Hon. Philip Charles Wentworth Howard (b. 1963)
                - (2) William Howard (b. 1994)
        - Hon. Oliver Howard (1875–1908)
          - Hubert Arthur George Howard (1901–1986)
            - (3) David Charles Hubert Howard (b. 1940)
              - (4) Oliver Charles Frederick Howard (b. 1980)
        - Hon. Geoffrey William Algernon Howard (1877–1935)
          - Major George Anthony Geoffrey Howard, Baron Howard of Henderskelfe (1920–1984)
            - (5) Hon. Nicholas Paul Geoffrey Howard (b. 1952)
              - (6) George Fulco Geoffrey Howard (b. 1985)
            - Hon. Simon Bartholomew Geoffrey Howard (1956–2022)
              - (7) Merlin Jasper Geoffrey Howard (b. 2002)
            - (8) Hon. Anthony Michael Geoffrey Howard (b. 1958)
  - Major Hon. Frederick Howard (1785–1815)
    - Frederick John Howard (1814–1897)
      - Alfred John Howard (1848–1916)
        - William Gilbert Howard (1877–1960)
          - Frederick Henry Howard (1915–2000)
            - male issue in succession
          - John William Howard (1917–1988)
            - male issue in succession
          - Mark Alfred Howard (1919–1999)
            - male issue in succession

The Earls of Carlisle are distantly in line to succeed to the dukedom of Norfolk, as descendants of Lord William Howard.

== See also ==
- Earl of Erroll
- Duke of Norfolk
- Lord Ruthven of Freeland
- Earl of Effingham
- Baron Howard de Walden
- Earl of Suffolk (1603 creation)
- Earl of Berkshire (1626 creation)
- Viscount Fitzalan of Derwent
- Baron Howard of Penrith
- Baron Howard of Escrick
- Baron Lanerton
- Baron Stafford (1640 creation)
