= Ruthven Bluff =

Ruthven Bluff (82°34′S 42°54′W) is a large rock bluff 1 nautical mile (1.9 km) south of Sosa Bluff in the Schneider Hills portion of the Argentina Range, Pensacola Mountains. Mapped by United States Geological Survey (USGS) from surveys and U.S. Navy air photos, 1956–67. Named by Advisory Committee on Antarctic Names (US-ACAN) for Richard W. Ruthven, USGS surveyor who visited the bluff in the 1965–66 season.

== Geology ==
Ruthven Bluff is an approximately 250 meters (820 ft) high bluff of Cambrian limestone. This bluff exposes a thick archaeocyathid reef composed of massive boundstone. At this locality, the boundstone contains numerous irregular cavities that are 50 to 100 mm (2.0 to 3.9 in) in diameter. These cavities are lined with fibrous cement and filled with either ferroancalcite or internal sediment. At Ruthven Bluff, alternating beds of grainstone and burrowed packstone encase this reef. The packstone beds contain subparallel zones of calcite-filled burrows up to 0.5 meters (1.6 ft) thick.
