= Margaret Leslie Hore-Ruthven =

British socialite (1902–1970)

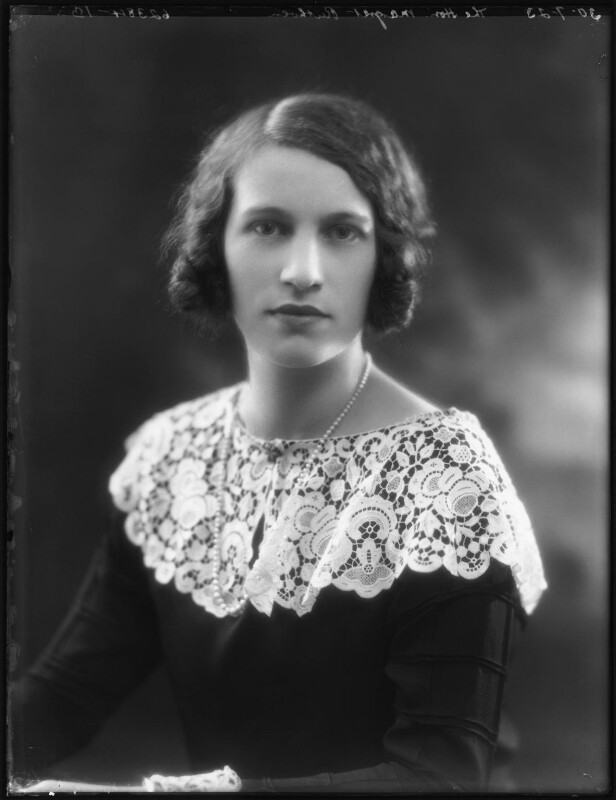
- Hon. Margaret Leslie Davies (née Ruthven)
- Born: Margaret Leslie Hore-Ruthven; 12 June 1901
- Died: April 30, 1970 (aged 68)
- Occupation: socialite
- Known for: Ralli Twins
- Spouse: Peter Llewelyn Davies (m. 1931)
- Parents: Walter Hore-Ruthven, 10th Lord Ruthven of Freeland (father); Mary Ruthven, Lady Ruthven of Freeland (mother)
- Relatives: Bridget Monckton, 11th Lady Ruthven of Freeland (sister); Alison Mary Hore-Ruthven (sister)

Hon. Margaret Leslie Hore-Ruthven (12 June 1901 – 30 April 1970) was a British socialite, one of the "Bright Young Things" of the 1920s. She and her twin sister Alison were included in The Book of Beauty by Cecil Beaton.

== Early life ==
Margaret Leslie Hore-Ruthven was born in Chelsea, London, one of four daughters of Walter Hore-Ruthven, 10th Lord Ruthven of Freeland, and Mary Ruthven, Lady Ruthven of Freeland. She had a twin sister, Alison (died 1974). Her nickname was "Peggy".

== Social influence and work ==
As a young woman, Peggy and her twin sister were among the founders of the unofficial society of the Bright Young People and were dubbed by newspapers the "Ralli Twins" and by society as "A&P". They used to dress alike and were basically identical. They used to scandalize society, like when, at the coming-of-age party for Loel Guinness, they wore very short, close-fitting silver dresses.

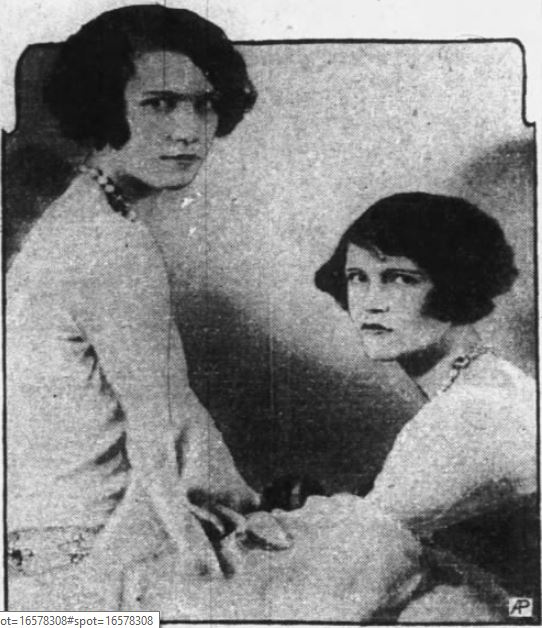
The Ralli twins

Both sisters modelled for a dress-making establishment. They were among the first in society to wear low-heeled slippers, making them fashionable. Under the name of Ralli Twins, they had a career dancing on stage, but family pressure had them renounce this venture.

According to Cecil Beaton, in his The Book of Beauty: "The Ruthven Twins are a most striking pair, always identically dressed; even to the brass necklaces, they are indistinguishable from one another. Richly carved with large full mouths, high cheek bones, and knobbly noses, they are as decorative as a pair of Assyrian rams. They are Byzantine goddesses, dressed like fairies in a circus design by Picasso, with their dark locks tied with little tinsel bows, their spangled ballet-skirts, and low-heeled shoes."

== Personal lives ==
In 1931 Margaret Leslie Hore-Ruthven married Peter Llewelyn Davies, the middle of five sons of Arthur and Sylvia Llewelyn Davies, one of the Llewelyn Davies boys befriended and later informally adopted by J. M. Barrie. Barrie publicly identified him as the source of the name for the title character in his play Peter Pan, or The Boy Who Wouldn't Grow Up. They had three sons: Ruthven (1933–1998), George (born 1935) and Peter (1940–1989).
