= Ruthven, Angus =

Coordinates: 56.6256°N 3.1620°W

Ruthven: Scottish Gaelic: Ruadhainn; Scots: Riven
- Location within Angus
- OS grid reference: NO288488
- Council area: Angus
- Lieutenancy area: Angus
- Country: Scotland
- Sovereign state: United Kingdom
- Post town: FORFAR
- Postcode district: DD8
- Dialling code: 01307
- Police: Scotland
- Fire: Scottish
- Ambulance: Scottish
- UK Parliament: Angus
- Scottish Parliament: Angus South

Ruthven (/ˈrɪvən/ RIV-ən) is a village in Angus, Scotland. It is two miles (3.2 km) north of Meigle, where the A926 road crosses the River Isla.

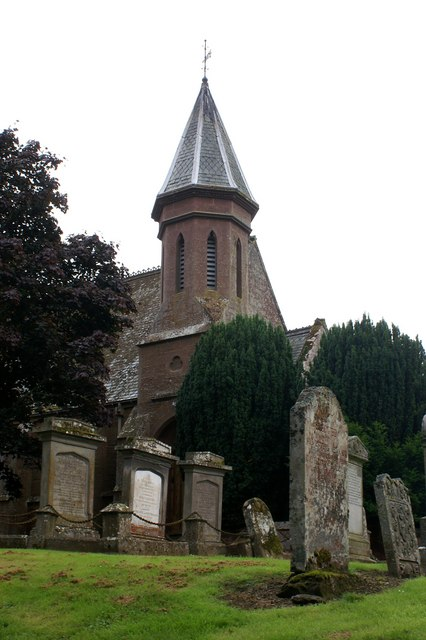
Ruthven Kirk

== See also ==
- Ruthven Castle, Angus
