= George Howard, 13th Earl of Carlisle =

British nobleman, politician and hereditary peer

Major The Right Honourable The Earl of Carlisle

Personal details
- Born: 15 February 1949 (age 77)
- Party: Liberal Democrat
- Parent: Charles Howard (father)
- Relatives: Howard family
- Education: Balliol College, Oxford
- Military career
- Service: British Army
- Rank: Major
- Unit: 9th/12th Royal Lancers

George William Beaumont Howard, 13th Earl of Carlisle (born 15 February 1949), styled Viscount Morpeth from 1963 to 1994, is a British nobleman, politician, and hereditary peer.

In 1994, on the death of his father, he inherited three English peerages, Earl of Carlisle, Viscount Howard of Morpeth, and Baron Dacre of Gillesland, and a fourth, Lord Ruthven of Freeland, in the Peerage of Scotland. He was a member of the House of Lords from 1994 to 1999.

== Life ==
Educated at Eton College and Balliol College, Oxford, and Newcastle Polytechnic, Carlisle is the son of Charles Howard, 12th Earl of Carlisle.

A member of the Howard family and a kinsman of the Duke of Norfolk, he is also a co-heir to the baronies of Greystock and Clifford.

He was commissioned as an officer into the 9th/12th Royal Lancers regiment of the British Army, retiring with the rank of Major.

As Viscount Morpeth, he unsuccessfully contested Easington in the 1987 general election (finishing last of three candidates, with 15.6% of the vote) and Leeds West in the 1992 general election (finishing third of six, with 8.9%) as well as Northumbria in the 1989 European elections for the Liberal Democrats, finishing last of four candidates with 5.6% of the vote.

Having lost his automatic right to a seat in the House of Lords under the House of Lords Act 1999, Carlisle has stood as a Liberal Democrat in by-elections to the House of Lords; his best performance was finishing a distant second to Labour's Viscount Hanworth in the 2011 by-election to replace Lord Strabolgi.

Carlisle is an academic and commentator on Baltic States matters, having lived for some time in Tartu, Estonia. The President of Estonia has appointed him a Knight 1st Class of the Order of the Cross of Terra Mariana. He played a role in securing memorial plaques to the 112 British servicemen killed in the 1919 operation which ensured the independence of the Baltic States. These plaques have been set up in numerous places, notably at Portsmouth Cathedral by the then First Sea Lord, Admiral Lord West of Spithead in 2005, and by HM The Queen during her visit to Tallinn in 2010.

The heir presumptive to the earldom and other peerages is the 13th Earl's brother, The Hon. Philip Charles Wentworth Howard.

Carlisle's coat of arms, with quarterings

== Decorations ==
- Knight 1st Class, Order of the Cross of Terra Mariana

== See also ==
- Castle Howard
- Hansard 1803–2005: contributions in Parliament by George Howard, 13th Earl of Carlisle

Peerage of England
Preceded by Charles Howard	Earl of Carlisle; 1994–present	Incumbent
Peerage of Scotland
Preceded by Charles Howard	Lord Ruthven of Freeland; 1994–present	Incumbent
