= Alison Mary Hore-Ruthven =

English socialite

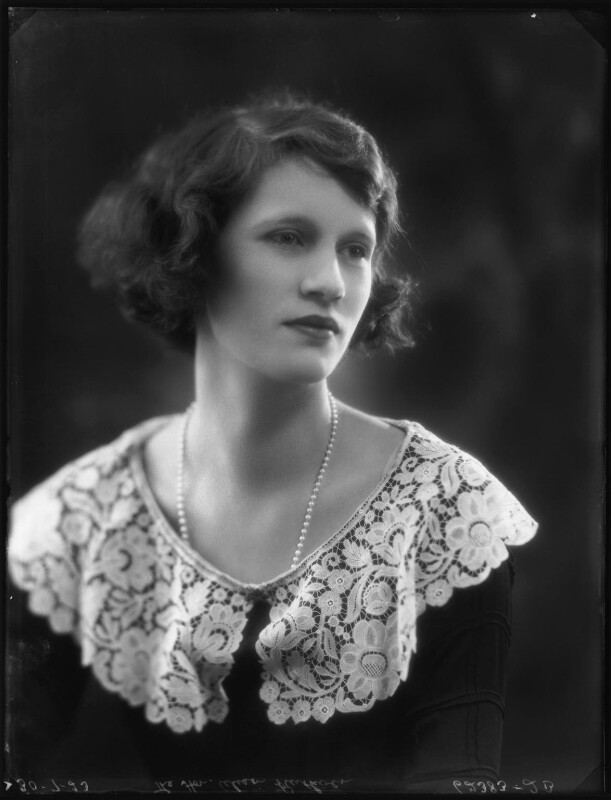
- Born: Alison Mary Hore-Ruthven; 12 June 1901
- Died: 1974 (aged 72–73)
- Other name: Hon. Alison Mary Barran
- Occupation: socialite
- Known for: Ralli Twins
- Spouse(s): Commander Sir John Leighton Barran, 3rd Baronet (m. 1928)
- Parents: Walter Hore-Ruthven, 10th Lord Ruthven of Freeland (father); Mary Ruthven, Lady Ruthven of Freeland (mother)
- Relatives: Bridget Monckton, 11th Lady Ruthven of Freeland (sister); Margaret Leslie Hore-Ruthven (sister)

Hon. Alison Mary Hore-Ruthven, Lady Barran (1901–1974) was one of the Ruthven Twins, or Ralli Twins, a pair of Bright Young Things who scandalized society with their antics.

== Biography ==
Alison Mary Hore-Ruthven was the daughter of Walter Hore-Ruthven, 10th Lord Ruthven of Freeland and Mary Ruthven, Lady Ruthven of Freeland.

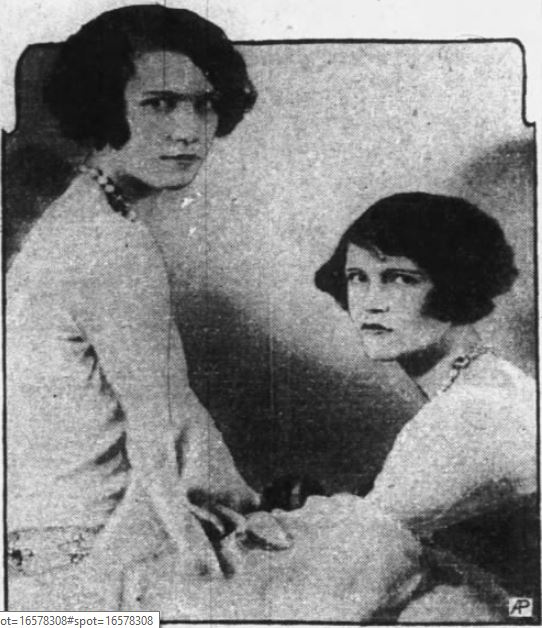
The Ralli Twins

As a young woman, Alison and her twin sister Margaret Leslie Hore-Ruthven, nicknamed "Peggy", were among the founders of the unofficial society of the Bright Young People and were dubbed by newspapers the "Ralli Twins" and by society as "A&P". They used to dress alike and were basically identical. They used to scandalize society, like when, at the coming-of-age party for Loel Guinness, they wore very short, close-fitting silver dresses.

Both sisters modelled for a dress-making establishment. They were among the firsts in society to wear the low-heeled slippers making them fashionable. Under the name of Ralli Twins, they had a career dancing on stage, but family pressure had them renounce this venture.

According to Cecil Beaton'sThe Book of Beauty: "The Ruthven Twins are the most striking pair, always identically dressed; even to the brass necklace, they are indistinguishable from one another. Richly carved with large full mouths, high cheek bones, and knobbly noses, they are as decorative as a pair of Assyrian rams. They are Byzantine goddesses, dressed like fairies in a circus design by Picasso, with their dark locks tied with little tinsel bows, their spangled ballet-skirts, and low-heeled shoes."

In 1928 Alison Mary Hore-Ruthven married Commander Sir John Leighton Barran, 3rd Baronet.
