= David Ruthven, 2nd Lord Ruthven of Freeland =

Scottish politician

David Ruthven, 2nd Lord Ruthven of Freeland (died April 1701) was a Scottish politician.

The son of Thomas Ruthven, 1st Lord Ruthven of Freeland by his wife Isabel Balfour, he succeeded his father as Lord Ruthven of Freeland in May 1671, and from 1689 to 1692 served as one of the commissioners for exercising the office of Lord High Treasurer of Scotland.

On 3rd April 1696 Ruthven was elected to the court of directors of the Company of Scotland trading to Africa and the Indies. He was a member of the Company's committee of improvements and helped to persuade the Presbyterian minister Rev. Adam Scott to join the first expedition to Darien on the isthmus of Panama in 1698.

Ruthven died without issue, and his title passed to his sister Jean.

Peerage of Scotland
Preceded by Thomas Ruthven	Lord Ruthven of Freeland; 1671–1701	Succeeded by Jean Ruthven
