= Ruthven Castle, Angus =

Castle in Scotland

Ruthven Castle
- Ruthven, Angus, Scotland; UK grid reference NO30214791

Site information
- Type: Tower
- Open to the public: Private
- Condition: Partially demolished

Location
- Location within Angus
- Coordinates: 56.6181°N 3.1360°W

Site history
- Built: unknown
- Materials: Stone

Ruthven Castle was a D-plan tower castle at Ruthven, Angus, Scotland. The castle was built pre 16th century near the eastern bank of the Isla River and was largely demolished in 1790 for construction of Ruthven House. It was once in the hands of the Lindsays, Earls of Crawford, then passed onto the Crichtons before being bought by an Ogilvy in 1744.
