= William Ruthven, 2nd Lord Ruthven =

Scottish nobleman (died 1552)

William Ruthven, 2nd Lord Ruthven (died December 1552) was a Scottish nobleman. He served as an Extraordinary Lord of Session and Keeper of the Privy Seal.

== Life ==
The 2nd Lord Ruthven was the son of William, Master of Ruthven (who was known as Lindsay for his mother, Isabel Livingstone Lindsay, until his legitimation on 2 July 1480), and Jean Hepburne. He succeeded his paternal grandfather, William Ruthven, 1st Lord Ruthven, sometime before 10 September 1528, when the king bestowed on him the office of custodian and constable of the king's hospital, near the Speygate, Perth.

In February 1532 Ruthven, Lord Oliphant, and other barons in that district of Scotland were fined for not appearing to sit as jurymen at the trial of Lady Glamis at Forfar for poisoning her husband. He was admitted an extraordinary lord of session on 27 November 1533; and on 8 August 1542 he was named a member of the privy council. On 28 August 1536 the king confirmed to him and his heirs the lands of Glenshie in Strathearn, erected into a free forest.

At the parliament held at Edinburgh in March 1543, after the death of King James V, Ruthven spoke on behalf of the laity being granted liberty to read the Scriptures in the English tongue; and at the same parliament he was chosen one of the eight noblemen, two of whom were to have the charge of the young queen every three months. On 24 July 1543 he signed a band to support Cardinal Beaton, but his adherence to the cardinal was only temporary, for in 1544 he resisted by force of arms the cardinal's candidate for the provostship of Perth.

Ruthven was appointed keeper of the privy seal in July 1546 . On 24 August of the same year he appeared before the privy council with Patrick Hepburn, 3rd Earl of Bothwell, as caution that Bothwell's ship, the Mary, and other four barks should not take any ships belonging to the Dutch, Flemings, or Hungarians. On 13 September he obtained an heritable grant of the king's house of Perth, of which he was keeper. He died early in December 1552.

== Family ==
In 1515 he married Janet Haliburton, heiress of the Haliburtons of Dirleton Castle, and sister of Mariotta Haliburton, Countess of Home.

Their eldest son, Patrick, inherited the Lordship on his father's death. They had three sons and seven daughters;

- Patrick Ruthven, 3rd Lord Ruthven
- James Ruthven of Forteviot
- Alexander Ruthven of Freeland
- Lilias Ruthven, married to David Drummond, 2nd Lord Drummond (she was reputed for her piety, and to her Robert Alexander in 1539 dedicated the Testament of William Hay, 6th Earl of Erroll, which he set forth in Scottish metre, printed Edinburgh 1571). Their daughter, Anne Drummond, was the first wife of John Erskine, Earl of Mar;
- Catherine Ruthven, who married Sir Colin Campbell of Glenorchy in 1551
- Cecilia Ruthven, who married Sir David Wemyss of that ilk, and was the mother of Sir John Wemyss
- Barbara Ruthven, to Patrick Gray, 5th Lord Gray
- Janet Ruthven, married John Crichton of Strathaird
- Margaret Ruthven, to John Johnstone of Elphinstone
- Christina Ruthven, to William Lundin of that ilk

Political offices
New office	Extraordinary Lord of Session; 1539–1552	Succeeded by multiple
Preceded by John Hamilton	Keeper of the Privy Seal of Scotland; 1547–1552	Succeeded by Alexander Seton
Peerage of Scotland
Preceded by William Ruthven	Lord Ruthven; 1528–1552	Succeeded by Patrick Ruthven
