= Thomas Ruthven, 1st Lord Ruthven of Freeland =

Scottish nobleman

Thomas Ruthven, 1st Lord Ruthven (died 6 May 1671) was the son of William Ruthven of Freeland by his wife Isabella Fotheringham, and a great-great-grandson of William Ruthven, 1st Lord Ruthven. In January 1651, he was created Lord Ruthven of Freeland, in the Peerage of Scotland, by King Charles II (who, though in exile from England, had been crowned King of Scots at Scone earlier that month). Lord Ruthven was married to Isabel, daughter of Robert Balfour (previously Arnot) and his wife Margaret Balfour, 2nd Lady Balfour of Burleigh, and by her was the father of a son David, who succeeded to his title. His daughter Jean later succeeded to the title, and on her death it passed to the issue of another daughter, Elizabeth, who had married Sir Francis Ruthven, 1st Baronet.

Peerage of Scotland
New creation	Lord Ruthven of Freeland; 1651–1671	Succeeded by David Ruthven
