= Baron Ruthven of Gowrie =

Barony in the Peerage of the United Kingdom

Baron Ruthven of Gowrie (pronounced Rivven), of Gowrie in the County of Perth, is a title in the Peerage of the United Kingdom, held by the Earl of Gowrie since 1956. It was created in 1919 for Walter Hore-Ruthven, 1st Baron Ruthven of Gowrie, who claimed also to be 9th Lord Ruthven of Freeland, in the Peerage of Scotland.

He was succeeded by his eldest son and namesake, Walter, the tenth Lord and second Baron. On the tenth Lord's death in 1956 the Scottish Lordship of Parliament and British barony separated. The Lordship, which could be passed on through female lines, devolved on his eldest daughter, Bridget, while the British barony, which could only be passed on through the male line, went to his great-nephew, Grey Ruthven, 2nd Earl of Gowrie, the grandson of Alexander Hore-Ruthven, 1st Earl of Gowrie, second son of the first Baron Ruthven of Gowrie. See Lord Ruthven of Freeland and Earl of Gowrie for further history of the titles.

== Barons Ruthven of Gowrie (1919) ==
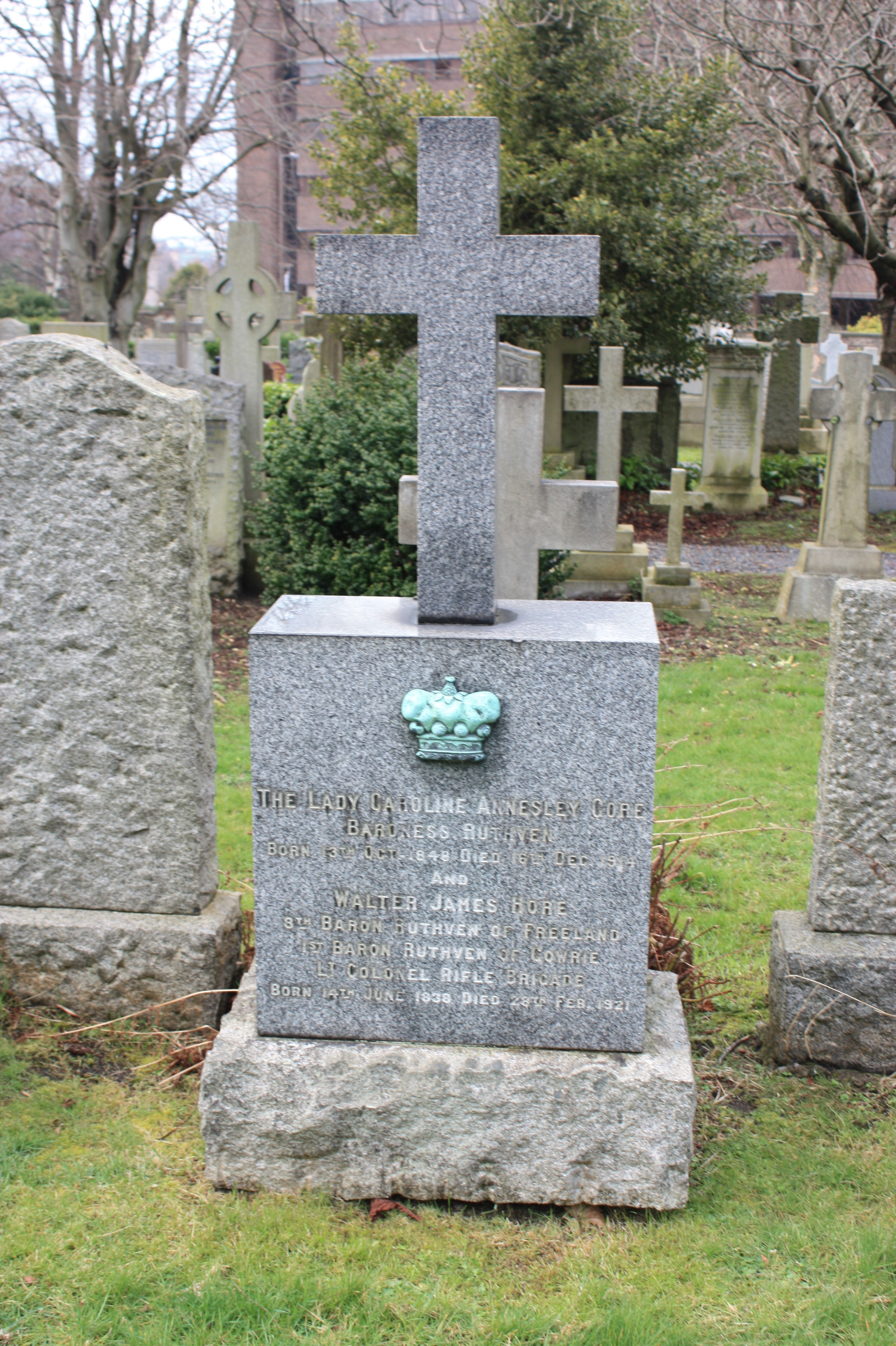
The grave of Walter James Hore, Baron Ruthven, Dean Cemetery

- Walter James Hore-Ruthven, 9th Lord Ruthven of Gowrie, 1st Baron Ruthven of Gowrie (1838–1921)
- Walter Patrick Hore-Ruthven, 10th Lord Ruthven of Freeland, 2nd Baron Ruthven of Gowrie (1870–1956)
- Alexander Patrick Greysteil 'Grey' Ruthven, 2nd Earl of Gowrie, 3rd Baron Ruthven of Gowrie (1939–2021)
- (Patrick Leo) Brer Ruthven, 3rd Earl of Gowrie, 4th Baron Ruthven of Gowrie (b. 1964).

The heir apparent is the present holder's son Heathcote Patrick Cornelius Hore-Ruthven, Viscount Ruthven of Canberra (b. 1990).
