= William Ruthven, 1st Lord Ruthven =

Scottish nobleman

William Ruthven
- 1st Lord Ruthven
- Known for: Founder of the Ruthven noble family lines
- Died: c. 1528
- Noble family: Clan Ruthven
- Spouses: Isabel Livingston; Christian Forbes
- Issue: William Ruthven, Master of Ruthven; John Ruthven; William Ruthven of Ballindean; Margaret Ruthven; Elizabeth Ruthven
- Father: Patrick Ruthven
- Occupation: Scottish nobleman

William Ruthven, 1st Lord Ruthven (died c. 1528) was a Scottish nobleman and founder of the noble lines of the Ruthven family.

William Ruthven of Ruthven /ˈrɪvən/ was created Lord Ruthven by summons at the Parliament of Scotland in February 1488. James III of Scotland made him a Lord of Parliament to gain his support against his rebels, who intended to make his son James, Duke of Rothesay King. The King left Edinburgh in March 1488, and joined Ruthven at Perth, and they travelled to Aberdeen. The first battle with the Prince's army was near Blackness Castle. The King was forced to negotiate with his rebels, and handed over Ruthven as a hostage.

Ruthven may have been chosen as a hostage because he was the rival of a rebel, Lord Oliphant, for the office of Sheriff of Perth. He remained a prisoner until the end of the conflict after the death of James III at the Battle of Sauchieburn, and was made to pay a ransom of £1000.

He was invested as a Privy Counsellor of Scotland in August 1513, and after 1515 became one of the guardians of the boy King James V of Scotland.

== Marriage and issue ==
Lord Ruthven married first Isabel Livingston; and had one son:

- William Ruthven, Master of Ruthven (k. 1513 Battle of Flodden)

He married secondly Christian Forbes, daughter of William Forbes, 3rd Lord Forbes and had four children:

- John Ruthven (died c. 1548)
- William Ruthven of Ballindean
- Margaret Ruthven, married first Alexander Stewart, 2nd Earl of Buchan; second John Erskine yr of Dun; third James Stewart of Ryland; fourth William Wood of Bonnyton
- Elizabeth Ruthven, married first William Hay, 5th Earl of Erroll; second Ninian Ross, 3rd Lord Ross

Peerage of Scotland
New creation	Lord Ruthven; 1488–1528	Succeeded by William Ruthven
