= Bridget Monckton, 11th Lady Ruthven of Freeland =

British peeress

The Right Honourable The Viscountess Monckton of Brenchley CBE
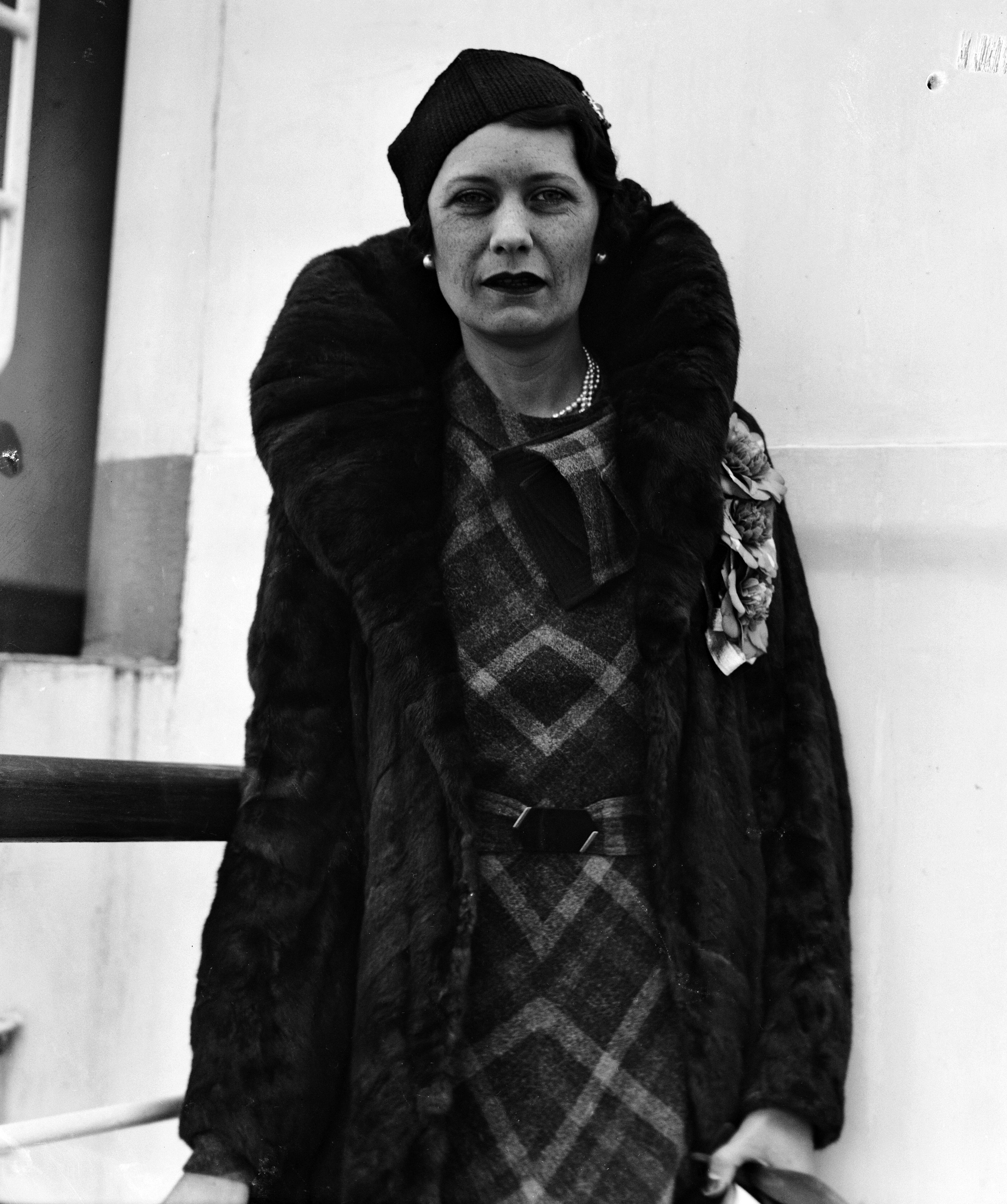
- Lady Monckton in 1934 (then known as Lady Carlisle)

Member of the House of Lords
- In office 1963–1982

Personal details
- Born: Bridget Helen Hore-Ruthven; 27 July 1896
- Died: 17 April 1982 (aged 85)
- Party: Conservative
- Spouses: George Howard, 11th Earl of Carlisle (m. 1918; div. 1947) Walter Monckton, 1st Viscount Monckton of Brenchley (m. 1947; died 1965)
- Children: 2, including Charles
- Parent(s): Walter Hore-Ruthven, 10th Lord Ruthven of Freeland; Jean Lampson
- Relatives: Alison Mary Hore-Ruthven (sister); Margaret Leslie Hore-Ruthven (sister)

Bridget Helen Monckton, 11th Lady Ruthven of Freeland, Viscountess Monckton of Brenchley, CBE (27 July 1896 – 17 April 1982) was a British peeress and Conservative member of the House of Lords best remembered as the wartime commander of women's services in India.

== Early life ==
The Honourable Bridget Hore-Ruthven was born in 1896, the eldest of the four daughters of Major-General Walter Hore-Ruthven, 10th Lord Ruthven of Freeland, and the former Jean Lampson. Among her sisters were Hon. Jean Elisabeth St Loe Hore-Ruthven (wife of Don Francisco Larios, only son of Don Ernesto Larios) and Hon. Alison Mary Hore-Ruthven (wife of Sir John Leighton Barran, 3rd Baronet) and Hon. Margaret Leslie Hore-Ruthven (wife of Peter Llewelyn Davies).

Her paternal grandparents were Walter James Hore-Ruthven, 9th Lord Ruthven of Freeland and Lady Caroline Annesley Gore (a daughter of Philip Gore, 4th Earl of Arran). Her maternal grandfather was Norman George Lampson, JP, DL, younger son of Sir Curtis Lampson, 1st Baronet. Bridget was therefore the niece both of Miles Lampson, 1st Baron Killearn, and of Alexander Hore-Ruthven, 1st Earl of Gowrie.

== Career ==
At the beginning of the Second World War, Lady Carlisle was a Senior Controller of the Auxiliary Territorial Service. The Countess of Carlisle was then promoted to become the Director of the Women's Auxiliary Corps (India) - the Indian counterpart of the ATS - and of the Women's Royal Indian Naval Service (WRINS). For her work in command, she was appointed a CBE (military division) in 1947.

From 1962 to 1974, Lady Monckton was the Chairman of the charity Attend: the National Association of Leagues of Hospital Friends. From 1977 to 1978, she returned to office at the charity when elected to be the President of Attend.

=== Peerage ===
Her father's title dated back to 1651 and was in the peerage of Scotland, hence the form: the Lord Ruthven, rather than Baron Ruthven, which meant that, unlike most English, Irish, British and UK titles, it could be inherited, as a matter of course, by a daughter. Therefore, upon the death of her father in 1956, Lady Monckton inherited the lordship of Ruthven of Freeland. She was now, suo jure, the Lady Ruthven of Freeland. In 1957, her husband received a peerage too, when he was created the first Viscount Monckton of Brenchley. Lady Ruthven of Freeland's marital title was now: the Viscountess Monckton of Brenchley.

Although entitled to a Scottish peerage, Bridget was not initially entitled to membership of the legislature. However, from 1963 she did take her seat in the House of Lords, after the new Peerage Act 1963 gave all Scottish peers and all female holders of hereditary peerages the right to sit in the upper chamber of parliament. Unusually, she sat concurrently with her son and with her second husband, plus her cousins mentioned above; she did not sit with her first husband, as he had died earlier in 1963.

== Personal life ==
On 17 January 1918 she married George Howard, 11th Earl of Carlisle, becoming the Countess of Carlisle. They had two children:

- Lady Carolyn Bridget Dacre Howard (b. 18 August 1919).
- Charles James Ruthven Howard (1923–1994), styled Viscount Morpeth, until he succeeded as the 12th Earl of Carlisle in 1963.

In 1947, Lord and Lady Carlisle divorced. Lady Carlisle then married Sir Walter Monckton on 13 August 1947, becoming Lady Monckton. Sir Walter was previously married to Mary Adelaide Somes Colyer-Fergusson (the eldest daughter of Sir Thomas Colyer-Fergusson, 3rd Baronet). The couple had no children together, but both had offspring from their previous marriages.

Lady Monckton of Brenchley died in April 1982, aged 85, and was succeeded in her own title by her son, who was already the Earl of Carlisle.

Peerage of Scotland
Preceded by Walter Hore-Ruthven	Lady Ruthven of Freeland; 1956–1982	Succeeded by Charles Howard
