= Rosa 'Crocus Rose' =

Apricot blend shrub rose cultivar

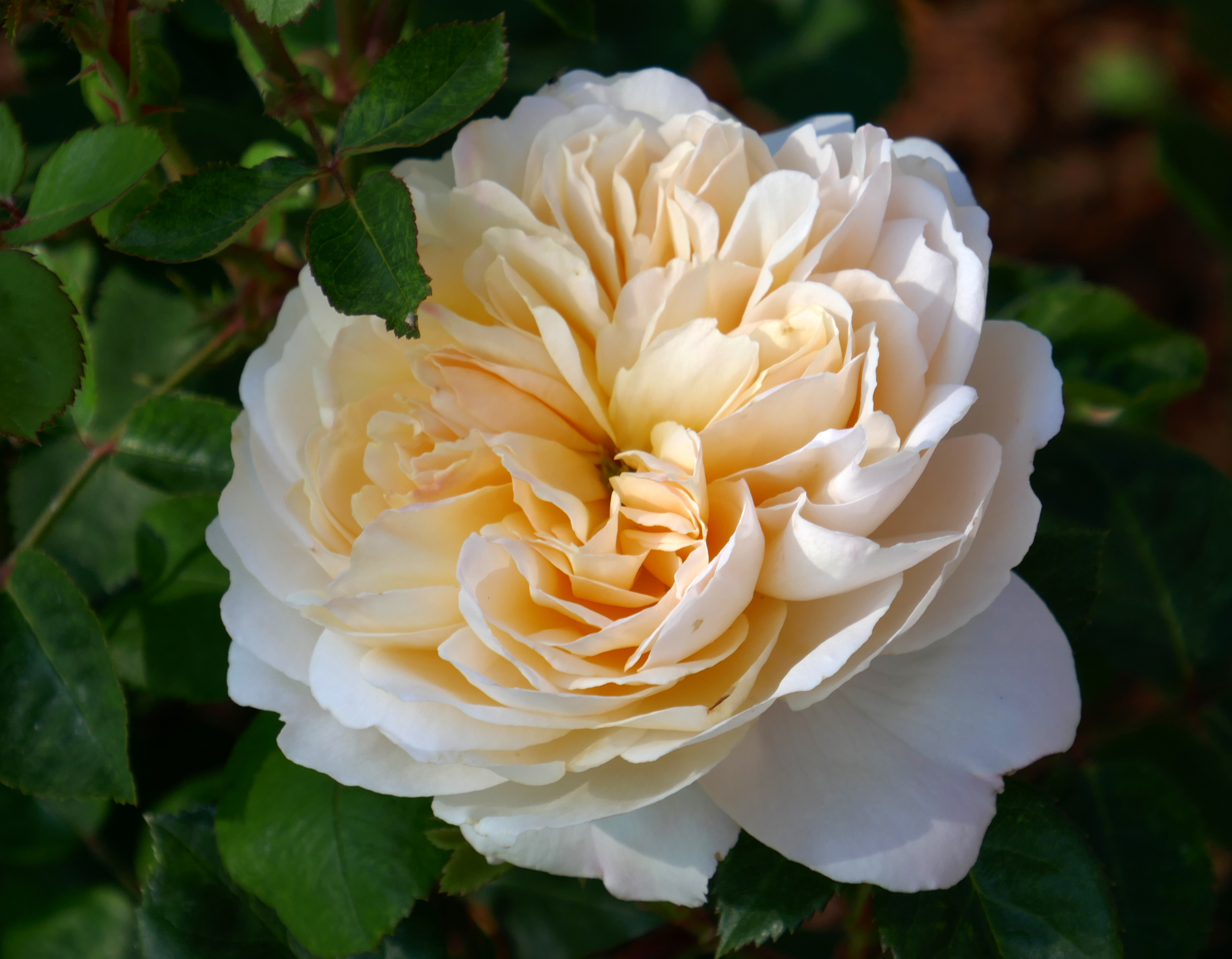
- Rosa 'Crocus Rose'
- Genus: Rosa hybrid
- Cultivar group: Shrub rose
- Cultivar: 'AUSquest'
- Breeder: David C. H. Austin
- Origin: Great Britain, 1992

Rosa 'Crocus Rose' (a.k.a. AUSquest) is an apricot blend shrub rose cultivar, created by British rose breeder David C. H. Austin inn 1992 and introduced into the UK by David Austin Roses Limited (UK) in 2000. The new rose was named for a health charity in the UK, The Crocus Trust.

== Description ==
'Crocus Rose' is a medium, bushy shrub rose, 3 to 4 ft (0.91–1.22 m) in height with a 2 to 3 ft (0.61–0.91 m) spread, and arching stems. The rose has a strong tea rose fragrance. Its flowers are 4 to 5 in (100–130 mm) in diameter, with a very full (40+ petals), cupped bloom form. Bloom colour is pale yellow or pale apricot, fading to cream at the outer petals. As the flowers mature, petals pale to near white. Flowers are carried in small clusters. The plant blooms in flushes throughout the growing season. Leaves are medium in size, glossy and medium green. The plant is disease resistant.

== History ==
=== David Austin roses ===
David C. H. Austin (1926–2018) was an award-winning rose breeder, nursery owner and writer from Shropshire, England. When he was young, he was attracted to the beauty of old garden roses, especially the Gallicas, the Centifolias and the Damasks, which were popular in nineteenth century France. Austin began breeding roses in the 1950s with the goal of creating new shrub rose varieties that would possess the best qualities of old garden roses while incorporating the long flowering characteristics of hybrid tea roses and floribundas.

His first commercially successful rose cultivar was 'Constance Spry', which he introduced in 1961. He created a new, informal class of roses in the 1960s, which he named "English Roses". Austin's roses are generally known today as "David Austin Roses". Austin attained international commercial success with his new rose varieties. Some of his most popular roses include 'Wife of Bath' (1969), 'Graham Thomas' (1983), 'Abraham Darby' (1985) and 'Gertrude Jekyll' (1986).

=== 'Crocus Rose' ===
Austin developed the cultivar from a cross between 'Golden Celebration' and an 'Unnamed seedling' in 1992. The new cultivar was introduced into the UK by David Austin Roses Limited (UK) in 2000. The cultivar was named for The Crocus Trust, a charity in the UK established to increase public awareness of colorectal cancer.
