= Rosa 'Jubilee Celebration' =

Coral-pink shrub rose cultivar

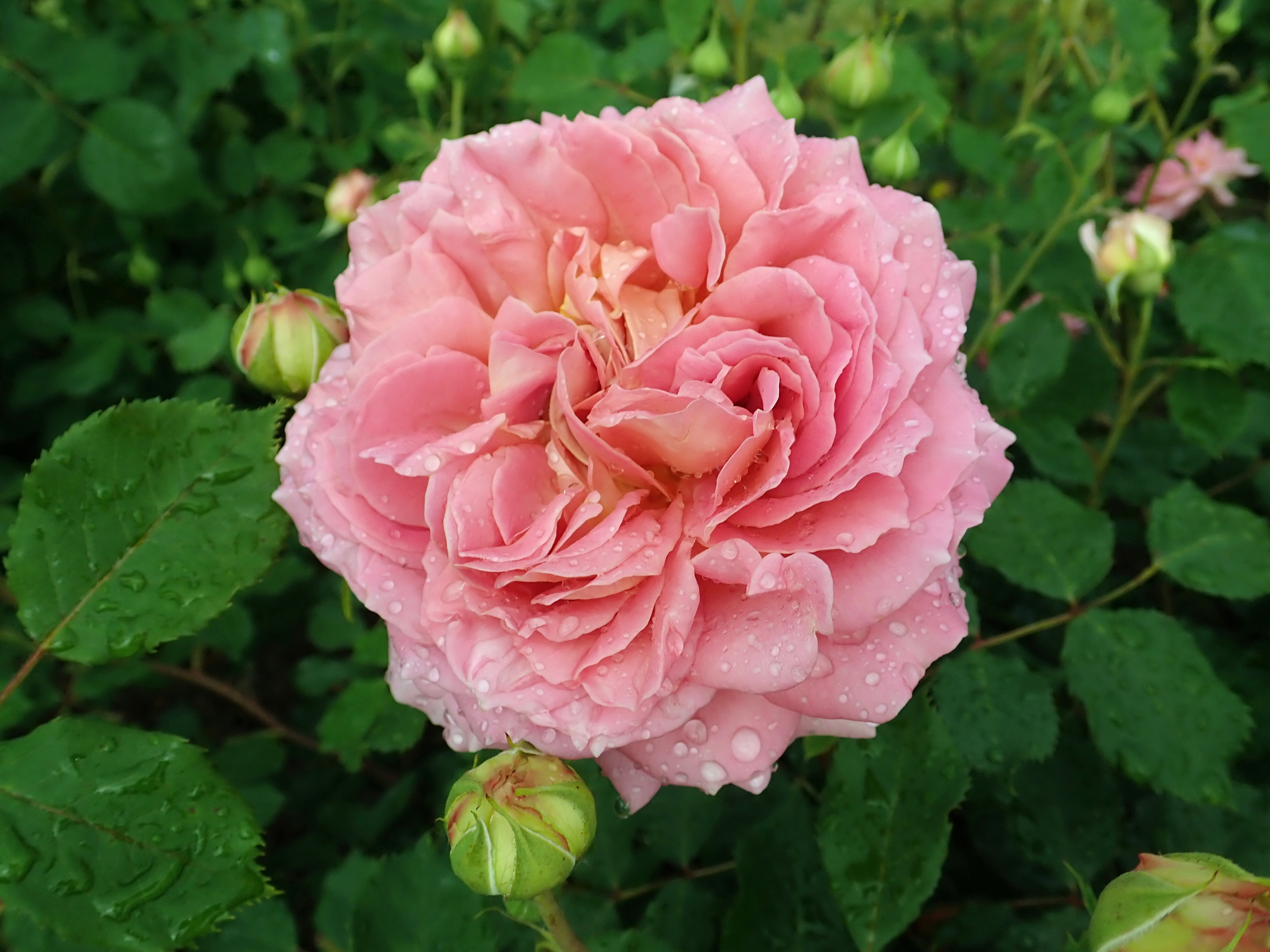
- Rosa 'Jubilee Celebration'
- Genus: Rosa hybrid
- Hybrid parentage: 'Golden Celebration' x 'Unnamed Seedling'
- Cultivar group: Shrub rose
- Cultivar: 'AUShunter'
- Breeder: David C. H. Austin
- Origin: Great Britain, 2002

Rosa 'Jubilee Celebration' (a.k.a. AUShunter) is a coral-pink shrub rose cultivar, created by British rose breeder David C. H. Austin in 1993. The rose was named in honor of the Golden Jubilee of Elizabeth II in 2002. The rose was introduced into the UK by David Austin Roses Limited (UK) in 2002.

== Description ==
'Jubilee Celebration' is a medium bushy shrub rose, 3 to 5 ft (0.91–1.52 m) in height, with a 2 to 3 ft (0.61–0.91 m) spread. The rose has a strong, lemon and raspberry scent. Its flowers are 4 to 5 in (100–130 mm) in diameter, with a cupped bloom form. Bloom colour is coral-pink with a yellow reverse. Flowers are carried in small clusters. Leaves are medium in size, semi-glossy and dark green. The rose blooms in flushes throughout the growing season.

== History ==
=== David Austin roses ===
David C. H. Austin (1926–2018) was an award-winning rose breeder, nursery owner and writer from Shropshire, England. When he was young, he was attracted to the beauty of old garden roses, especially the Gallicas, the Centifolias and the Damasks, which were popular in nineteenth century France. Austin began breeding roses in the 1950s with the goal of creating new shrub rose varieties that would possess the best qualities of old garden roses while incorporating the long flowering characteristics of hybrid tea roses and floribundas.

His first commercially successful rose cultivar was 'Constance Spry', which he introduced in 1961. He created a new, informal class of roses in the 1960s, which he named "English Roses". Austin's roses are generally known today as "David Austin Roses". Austin attained international commercial success with his new rose varieties. Some of his most popular roses include 'Wife of Bath' (1969), 'Graham Thomas' (1983), 'Abraham Darby' (1985) and 'Gertrude Jekyll' (1986).

=== 'Jubilee Celebration' ===
Austin developed the new cultivar by crossing 'Golden Celebration' with an unnamed seedling in 1993. The rose was introduced into the UK by David Austin Roses Limited (UK) in 2002. The rose was named in honor of the Golden Jubilee of Elizabeth II in 2002
