= Rosa 'Wildeve' =

Pink shrub rose cultivar

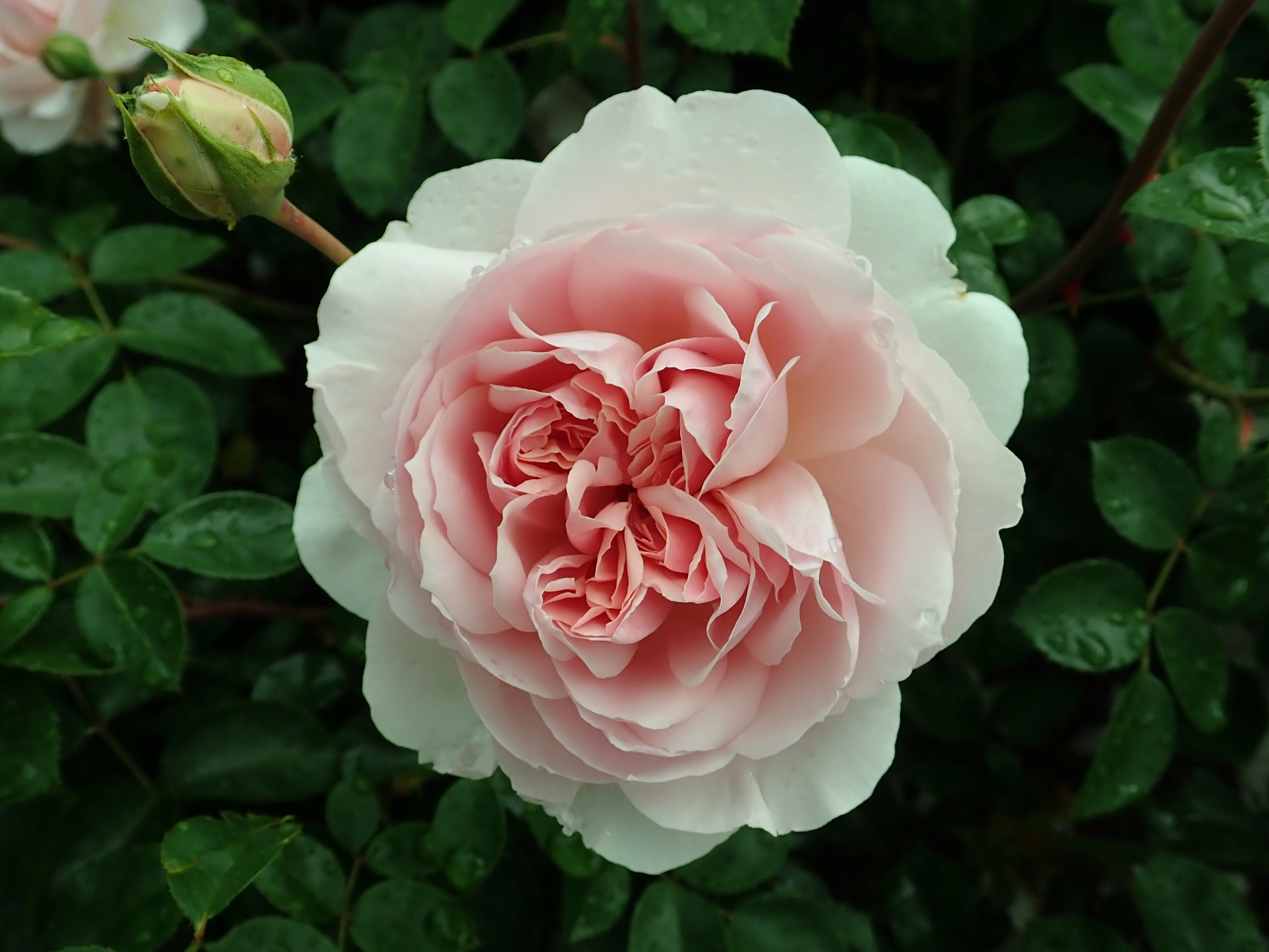
- Rosa 'Wildeve'
- Genus: Rosa hybrid
- Cultivar group: Shrub rose
- Cultivar: 'AUSbonny'
- Breeder: David C. H. Austin
- Origin: Great Britain, 2003

Rosa 'Wildeve' (aka AUSbonny) is a pink blend shrub rose cultivar, created by British rose breeder David C. H. Austin in 1995. The rose was named for the character, Damon Wildeve, in Thomas Hardy's book, The Return of the Native. The rose was introduced into the UK by David Austin Roses Limited (UK) in 2003.

== Description ==
'Wildeve' is a medium-tall bushy shrub rose, 3 to 5 ft (0.91–1.52 m) in height, with a 3 to 4 ft (0.91–1.22 m) spread, on long, arching branches. The rose has little or no fragrance. Its flowers are 4 to 5 in (100–130 mm) in diameter, with a quartered, rosette bloom form. Bloom colour is light pink, sometimes with touches of apricot, and the colour fades to near white at the edges. Flowers are carried in small clusters. Leaves are large, semi-glossy and dark green. The rose blooms continually blooms throughout the growing season.

== History ==
=== David Austin roses ===
David C. H. Austin (1926–2018) was an award-winning rose breeder, nursery owner and writer from Shropshire, England. When he was young, he was attracted to the beauty of old garden roses, especially the Gallicas, the Centifolias and the Damasks, which were popular in nineteenth century France. Austin began breeding roses in the 1950s with the goal of creating new shrub rose varieties that would possess the best qualities of old garden roses while incorporating the long flowering characteristics of hybrid tea roses and floribundas.

His first commercially successful rose cultivar was 'Constance Spry', which he introduced in 1961. He created a new, informal class of roses in the 1960s, which he named "English Roses". Austin's roses are generally known today as "David Austin Roses". Austin attained international commercial success with his new rose varieties. Some of his most popular roses include 'Wife of Bath' (1969), 'Graham Thomas' (1983), 'Abraham Darby' (1985) and 'Gertrude Jekyll' (1986).

=== 'Wildeve' ===
Austin developed the new by crossing an unnamed seedling with 'Golden Celebration'. Six resulting seedlings of that cross were chosen and grafted onto 'Laxa' ( Rosa canina 'Laxa') rootstock. This new cultivar was given the name 'Ausbonny'. 'Wildeve' was introduced into the UK by David Austin Roses Limited (UK) in 2003. The rose was named for the character, Damon Wildeve, in Thomas Hardy's book, The Return of the Native.
