= Rosa 'Grace' =

Apricot shrub rose cultivar

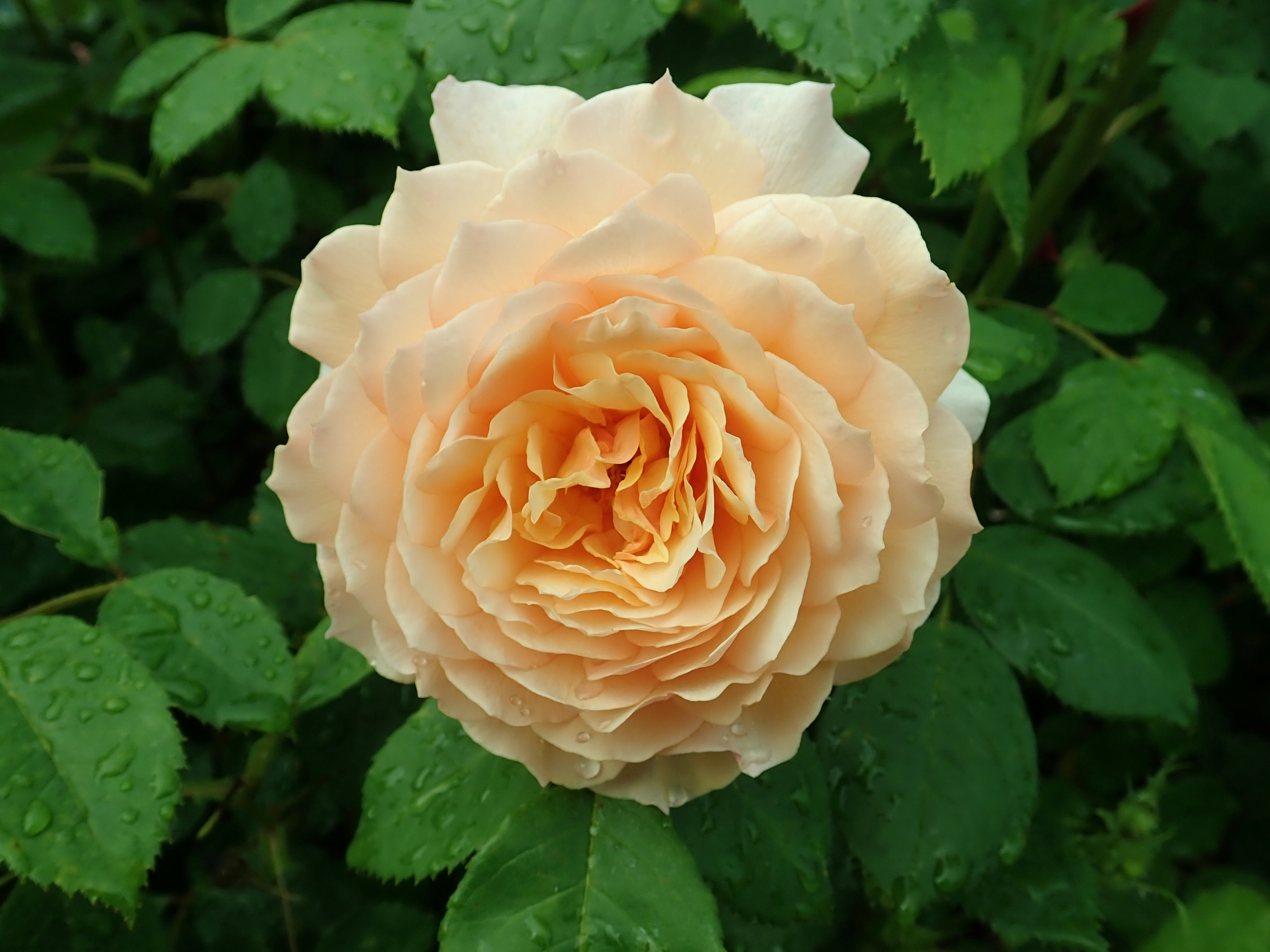
- Rosa 'Grace'
- Genus: Rosa hybrid
- Hybrid parentage: 'Sweet Juliet' x 'Unnamed Seedling'
- Cultivar group: Shrub rose
- Cultivar: 'AUSkeppy'
- Breeder: David C. H. Austin
- Origin: Great Britain, 1992

Rosa 'Grace' (a.k.a. AUSkeppy) is an apricot shrub rose cultivar, developed by British rose breeder David C. H. Austin in 1992 and introduced into the UK by David Austin Roses Limited (UK) in 2001.

== Description ==
'Grace' is a medium-tall bushy shrub rose, 4 to 5 ft (1.2–1.5 m) in height, with a 3 to 4 ft (0.91–1.22 m) spread. The rose has a strong tea fragrance. Its flowers are 2 to 3 in (51–76 mm) in diameter, with a very full (40+ petals) cupped bloom form. Bloom colour is apricot, darker in the center and lighter apricot toward the edges. Flowers are carried in clusters. Leaves are medium in size and light green. The rose blooms in flushes throughout the growing season.

== History ==
=== David Austin roses ===
David C. H. Austin (1926–2018) was an award-winning rose breeder, nursery owner and writer from Shropshire, England. When he was young, he was attracted to the beauty of old garden roses, especially the Gallicas, the Centifolias and the Damasks, which were popular in nineteenth century France. Austin began breeding roses in the 1950s with the goal of creating new shrub rose varieties that would possess the best qualities of old garden roses while incorporating the long flowering characteristics of hybrid tea roses and floribundas.

His first commercially successful rose cultivar was 'Constance Spry', which he introduced in 1961. He created a new, informal class of roses in the 1960s, which he named "English Roses". Austin's roses are generally known today as "David Austin Roses". Austin attained international commercial success with his new rose varieties. Some of his most popular roses include 'Wife of Bath' (1969), 'Graham Thomas' (1983), 'Abraham Darby' (1985) and 'Gertrude Jekyll' (1986).

=== 'Grace' ===
Austin developed the new cultivar by crossing 'Golden Celebration' and an unnamed seedling. The rose was introduced into the UK by David Austin Roses Limited (UK) in 2001. According to the David Austin company, the rose "was named to celebrate the defining characteristic of the English Roses".
