= Rosa 'Boscobel' =

Pink shrub rose cultivar

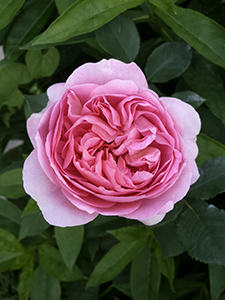
- Rosa Boscobel'
- Genus: Rosa hybrid
- Cultivar group: Shrub rose
- Cultivar: 'AUScousin'
- Breeder: David C. H. Austin
- Origin: Great Britain, 2012

Rosa 'Boscobel' (aka AUScousin) is a pink shrub rose cultivar, bred by British rose breeder David C. H. Austin, and introduced into the UK by David Austin Roses Limited (UK) in 2012. The cultivar was named after Boscobel House (1632) in Shropshire, England.

== Description ==
'Boscobel' is a medium-sized, bushy upright rose, 3 to 4 ft (0.91–1.22 m) in height, with a 2 to 3 ft (0.61–0.91 m) spread. The rose has a moderate, myrrh-like fragrance. Its flowers are average in size, 3.5 in (89 mm), with a cupped, rosette bloom form. 'Boscobel' blooms in flushes throughout the season. Red buds open to perfectly formed rosette flowers, which vary from salmon-pink to orange-pink in colour. Leaves are glossy and dark green.

== History ==
=== David Austin roses ===
David C. H. Austin (1926–2018) was an award-winning rose breeder, nursery owner and writer from Shropshire, England. When he was young, he was attracted to the beauty of old garden roses, especially the Gallicas, the Centifolias and the Damasks, which were popular in nineteenth century France. Austin began breeding roses in the 1950s with the goal of creating new shrub rose varieties that would possess the best qualities of old garden roses while incorporating the long flowering characteristics of hybrid tea roses and floribundas.

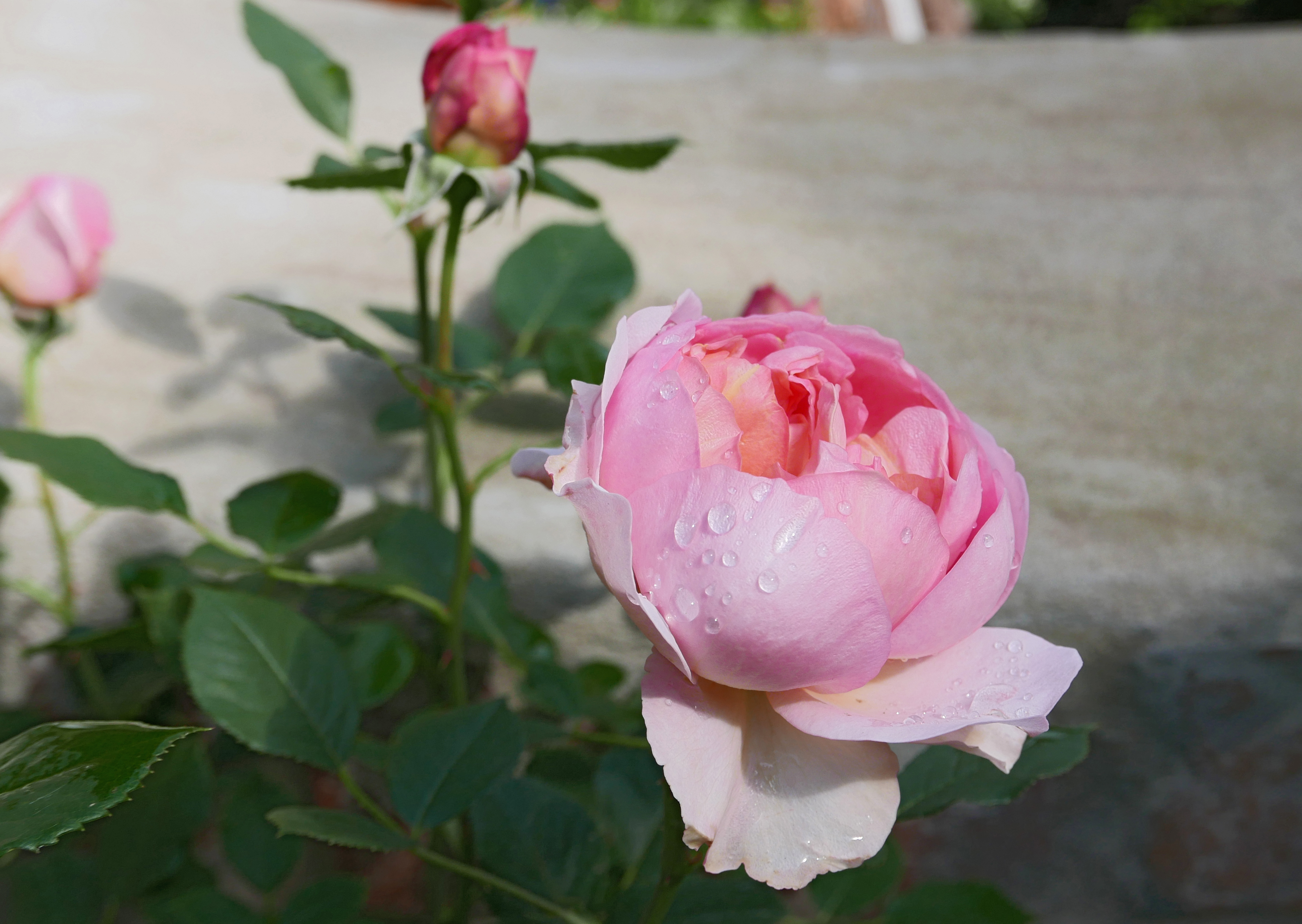
Rosa 'Boscobel'

His first commercially successful rose cultivar was 'Constance Spry', which he introduced in 1961. He created a new, informal class of roses in the 1960s, which he named "English Roses". Austin's roses are generally known today as "David Austin Roses". Austin attained international commercial success with his new rose varieties. Some of his most popular roses include 'Wife of Bath' (1969), 'Graham Thomas' (1983), 'Abraham Darby' (1985) and 'Gertrude Jekyll' (1986).

=== 'Boscobel' ===
Austin developed 'Boscobel' before 2011. The cultivar was developed from a cross between two unnamed, unpatented parents. The cultivar was introduced into the UK by David Austin Roses Limited (UK) in 2012. It was named after Boscobel House (1632) in Shropshire, England.
