= Rosa 'Shropshire Lass' =

Light pink shrub rose cultivar

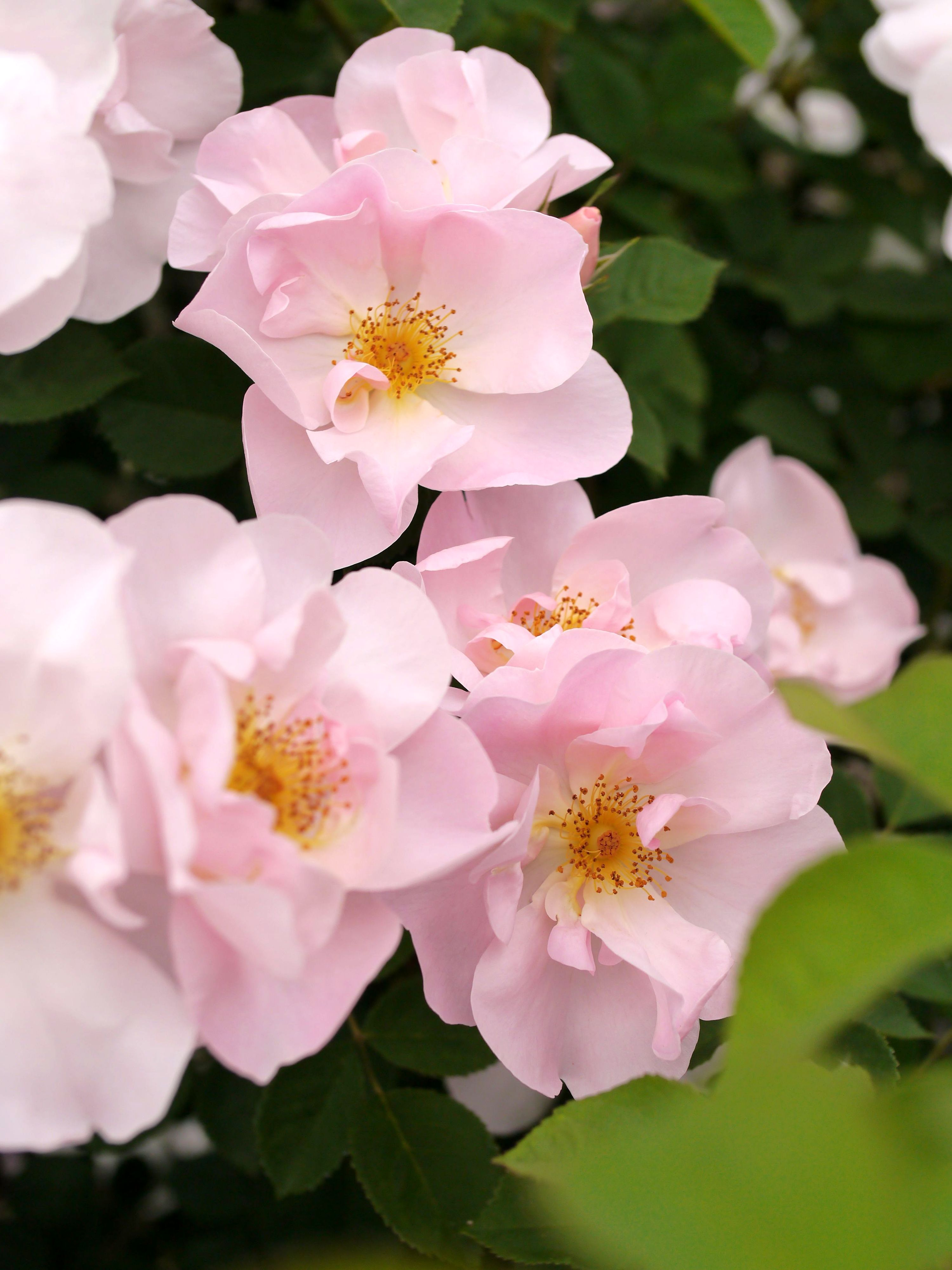
- Rosa Shropshire Lass'
- Genus: Rosa hybrid
- Hybrid parentage: 'Madame Butterfly' × 'Madame Legras de St. Germain'
- Cultivar group: Shrub rose
- Cultivar: AUSbury
- Breeder: David C. H. Austin
- Origin: Great Britain, 1968

Rosa 'Shropshire Lass' is a tall pink shrub rose cultivar, bred by British rose breeder David C. H. Austin, and introduced into the UK by David Austin Roses Limited (UK) in 1968. 'Shropshire Lass' was one of Austin's earliest shrub roses, and a precursor to Austin's English rose collection.

== Description ==
'Shropshire Lass' is a tall shrub rose, 5 to 8 ft (1.5–2.4 m) in height, with a 3 to 4 ft (0.91–1.22 m) spread. It can be trained as a climbing rose, and can grow up to sixteen feet on a wall. It makes an excellent support for late-blooming clematis. The rose has a mild fragrance. Its flowers are large, 4 to 5 in (100–130 mm), with a single to semi-double, saucer-shaped bloom form. 'Shropshire Lass' is a once-blooming rose during the summer, but flowers abundantly. Flowers open as a light pink and fade to white as they age. They have prominent gold stamens that fade over time to white. Leaves are thin and unattractive. The plant has many prickles on its thin stems.

== History ==
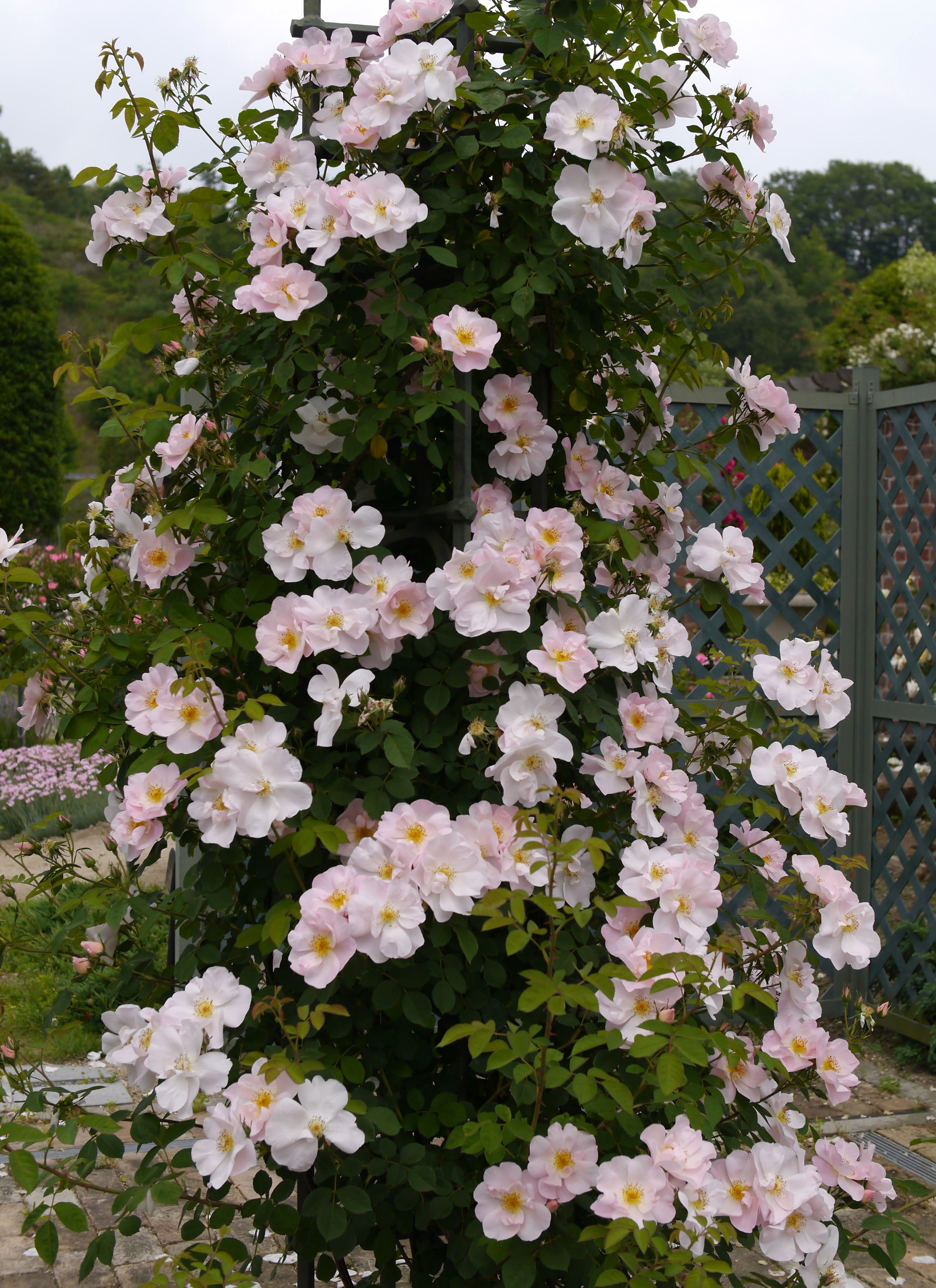
'Shropshire Lass'trained as a climber

=== David Austin roses ===
David C. H. Austin (1926–2018) was an award-winning rose breeder, nursery owner and writer from Shropshire, England. When he was young, he was attracted to the beauty of old garden roses, especially the Gallicas, the Centifolias and the Damasks, which were popular in nineteenth century France. Austin began breeding roses in the 1950s with the goal of creating new shrub rose varieties that would possess the best qualities of old garden roses while incorporating the long flowering characteristics of hybrid tea roses and floribundas.

His first commercially successful rose cultivar was 'Constance Spry', which he introduced in 1961. He created a new, informal class of roses in the 1960s, which he named "English Roses". Austin's roses are generally known today as "David Austin Roses". Austin attained international commercial success with his new rose varieties. Some of his most popular roses include 'Wife of Bath' (1969), 'Graham Thomas' (1983), 'Abraham Darby' (1985) and 'Gertrude Jekyll' (1986).

=== 'Shropshire Lass' ===
Austin developed 'Shropshire Lass' by crossing the pink Hybrid tea, 'Madame Butterfly', with the white blend 'Alba', 'Madame Legras de St. Germain'. The cultivar was introduced into the UK by David Austin Roses Limited (UK) in 1968. 'Shropshire Lass' was one of Austin's earliest shrub roses, and a precursor to Austin's English rose collection.
