= Rosa 'Comtes de Champagne' =

Apricot shrub rose cultivar

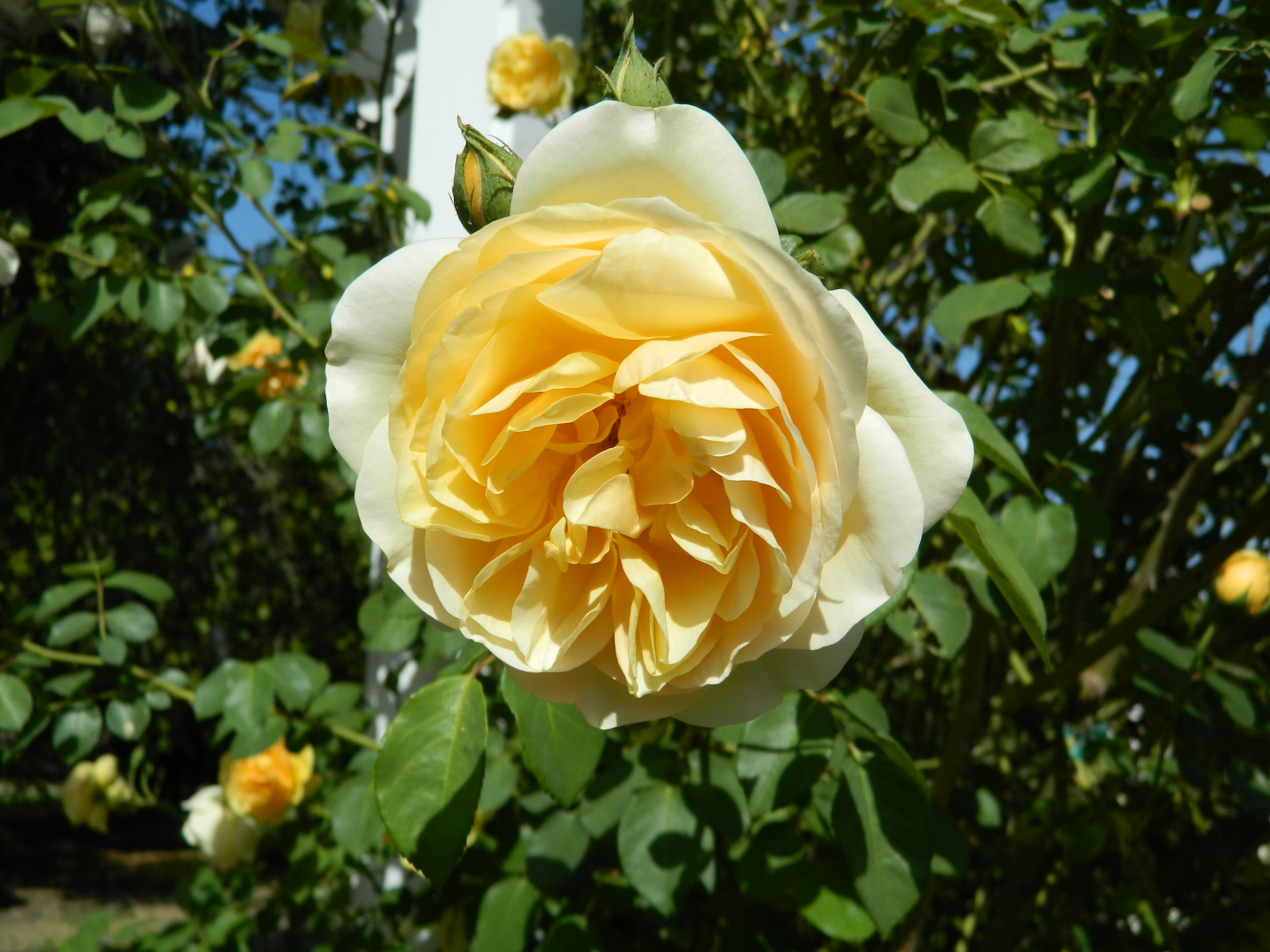
- Rosa 'Comtes de Champagne'
- Genus: Rosa hybrid
- Hybrid parentage: 'Unnamed seedling' x 'Tamora'
- Cultivar group: Shrub rose
- Cultivar: 'AUSufo'
- Marketing names: 'Comtes de Champagne', 'Coniston'
- Breeder: David C. H. Austin
- Origin: Great Britain, 1992

Rosa 'Comtes de Champagne' (a.k.a. AUSufo) is an apricot shrub rose cultivar, developed by British rose breeder David C. H. Austin in 1992 and introduced into the UK by David Austin Roses Limited (UK) in 2001. The rose was named for the champagne, Comtes de Champagne, produced by the French winery, Taittinger.

== Description ==
'Comtes de Champagne' is a medium-tall, bushy shrub rose, 3 to 4 ft (0.91–1.22 m) in height, with a 4 to 5 ft (1.2–1.5 m) spread. The rose has a sweet honey like fragrance. Its flowers are 3 to 4 in (76–102 mm) in diameter, with a semi-double (8-15 petals) cupped bloom form. Yellow buds open to a yellow cupped flower, which fades to a pale apricot as the bloom ages. Flowers are carried in clusters. Leaves are medium in size, semi-glossy and dark green. 'Comtes de Champagne' blooms in flushes throughout the growing season.

== History ==
=== David Austin roses ===
David C. H. Austin (1926–2018) was an award-winning rose breeder, nursery owner and writer from Shropshire, England. When he was young, he was attracted to the beauty of old garden roses, especially the Gallicas, the Centifolias and the Damasks, which were popular in nineteenth century France. Austin began breeding roses in the 1950s with the goal of creating new shrub rose varieties that would possess the best qualities of old garden roses while incorporating the long flowering characteristics of hybrid tea roses and floribundas.

His first commercially successful rose cultivar was 'Constance Spry', which he introduced in 1961. He created a new, informal class of roses in the 1960s, which he named "English Roses". Austin's roses are generally known today as "David Austin Roses". Austin attained international commercial success with his new rose varieties. Some of his most popular roses include 'Wife of Bath' (1969), 'Graham Thomas' (1983), 'Abraham Darby' (1985) and 'Gertrude Jekyll' (1986).

=== 'Comtes de Champagne' ===
Austin developed the new cultivar in 1992, by crossing apricot shrub rose, 'Tamora' with an unnamed seedling. The rose was introduced into the UK by David Austin Roses Limited (UK) in 2001. The rose was named for the champagne, Comtes de Champagne, produced by the legendary French winery, Taittinger.
