= Rosa 'Strawberry Hill' =

Pink shrub rose cultivar

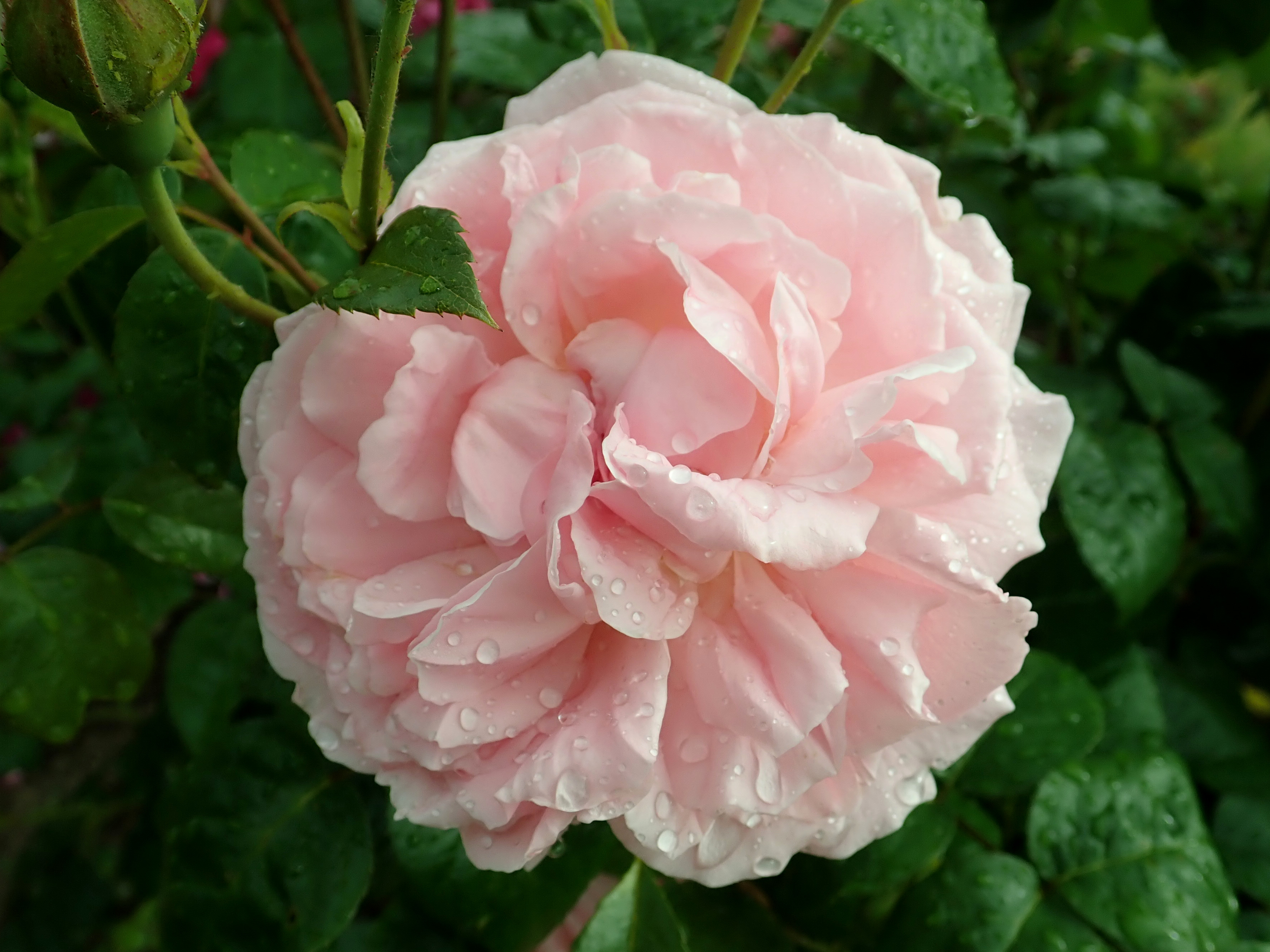
- Rosa Strawberry Hill'
- Genus: Rosa hybrid
- Cultivar group: Shrub rose
- Cultivar: 'AUSrimini'
- Breeder: David C. H. Austin
- Origin: Great Britain, 2006

Rosa 'Strawberry Hill' (a.k.a. AUSrimini) is a medium-pink shrub rose cultivar, bred by British rose breeder David C. H. Austin in 2001, and introduced into the UK by David Austin Roses Limited (UK) in 2006. The cultivar was named after Strawberry Hill House, an 18th-century Gothic Revival house in Twickenham, London.

== Description ==
'Strawberry Hill' is a medium, bushy shrub rose, 3 to 4 ft (0.91–1.22 m) in height, with a 3 to 4 ft (0.91–1.22 m) spread. The rose has a strong, myrrh fragrance. Its flowers are large in size, 4 to 5 in (100–130 mm), with a cupped, old rose bloom form. Flower buds are medium-sized and pointed. Bloom colour is a medium pink fading to light pink at the edges. 'Strawberry Hill' blooms in small clusters throughout the season. Leaves are glossy and dark green. The plant is a vigorous grower.

== History ==
=== David Austin roses ===
David C. H. Austin (1926–2018) was an award-winning rose breeder, nursery owner and writer from Shropshire, England. When he was young, he was attracted to the beauty of old garden roses, especially the Gallicas, the Centifolias and the Damasks, which were popular in nineteenth century France. Austin began breeding roses in the 1950s with the goal of creating new shrub rose varieties that would possess the best qualities of old garden roses while incorporating the long flowering characteristics of hybrid tea roses and floribundas.

His first commercially successful rose cultivar was 'Constance Spry', which he introduced in 1961. He created a new, informal class of roses in the 1960s, which he named "English Roses". Austin's roses are generally known today as "David Austin Roses". Austin attained international commercial success with his new rose varieties. Some of his most popular roses include 'Wife of Bath' (1969), 'Graham Thomas' (1983), 'Abraham Darby' (1985) and 'Gertrude Jekyll' (1986).

=== 'Strawberry Hill' ===
Austin developed 'Strawberry Hill' in 2001 from a cross between two unnamed parents. The new cultivar was introduced into the UK by David Austin Roses Limited (UK) in 2006. The cultivar was named after Strawberry Hill House, an 18th-century Gothic Revival house, built by Horace Walpole in Twickenham, London.
