= Rosa 'The Mayflower' =

Pink shrub rose cultivar

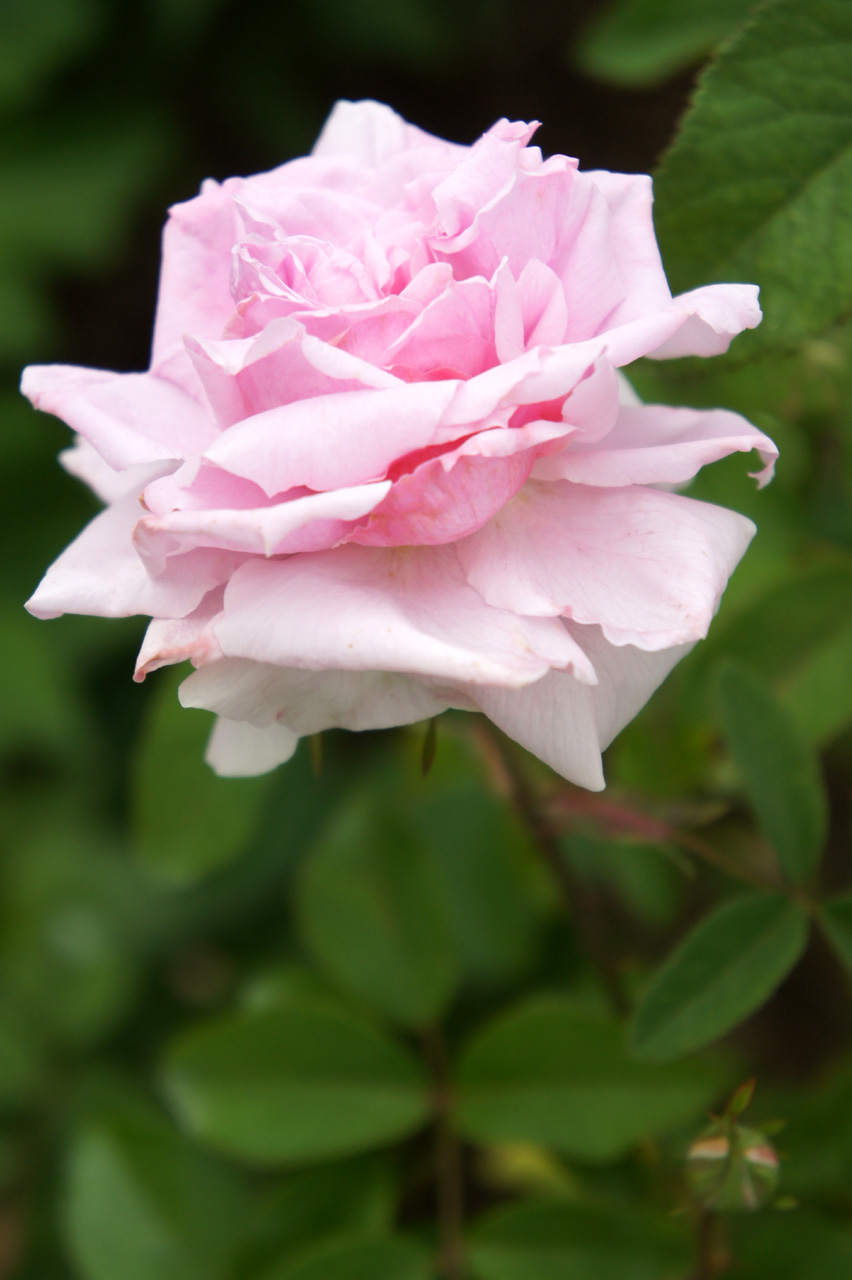
- Rosa 'The Mayflower'
- Genus: Rosa hybrid
- Hybrid parentage: 'Unnamed parent' x ''The Countryman'
- Cultivar group: Shrub rose
- Cultivar: 'AUStilly'
- Breeder: David C. H. Austin
- Origin: Great Britain, 1992

Rosa 'The Mayflower' (aka AUStilly) is a medium-pink shrub rose cultivar, bred by British rose breeder David C. H. Austin in 1992 and introduced into the UK by David Austin Roses Limited (UK) in 2001. It was named to celebrate the initial publication of the company's American catalogue of roses.

== Description ==
'The Mayflower' is a medium bushy, almost thornless shrub rose, 3 to 4 ft (0.91–1.22 m) in height, with a 3 to 4 ft (0.91–1.22 m) spread The rose has a moderate, Old Rose fragrance. Its flowers are 2.25 in (57 mm) in diameter, with a cupped, very full bloom form. Bloom colour is a medium pink colour. Flowers have a tendency to ball in rainy weather. 'The Mayflower' blooms in small clusters throughout the season. Leaves are matte, medium-sized and dark green. The plant is very disease resistant.

== History ==
=== David Austin roses ===
David C. H. Austin (1926–2018) was an award-winning rose breeder, nursery owner and writer from Shropshire, England. When he was young, he was attracted to the beauty of old garden roses, especially the Gallicas, the Centifolias and the Damasks, which were popular in nineteenth century France. Austin began breeding roses in the 1950s with the goal of creating new shrub rose varieties that would possess the best qualities of old garden roses while incorporating the long flowering characteristics of hybrid tea roses and floribundas.

His first commercially successful rose cultivar was 'Constance Spry', which he introduced in 1961. He created a new, informal class of roses in the 1960s, which he named "English Roses". Austin's roses are generally known today as "David Austin Roses". Austin attained international commercial success with his new rose varieties. Some of his most popular roses include 'Wife of Bath' (1969), 'Graham Thomas' (1983), 'Abraham Darby' (1985) and 'Gertrude Jekyll' (1986).

=== 'The Mayflower' ===
Austin developed 'The Mayflower' in 1992 from a cross between one unnamed parent and 'The Countryman’. The new cultivar was introduced into the UK by David Austin Roses Limited (UK) in 2001. It was named to celebrate the initial publication of the company's American rose catalogue. 'The Mayflower' was used to propagate one child plant, 'Susan Williams-Ellis'.
