= Rosa 'Canterbury' =

Medium pink shrub rose cultivar

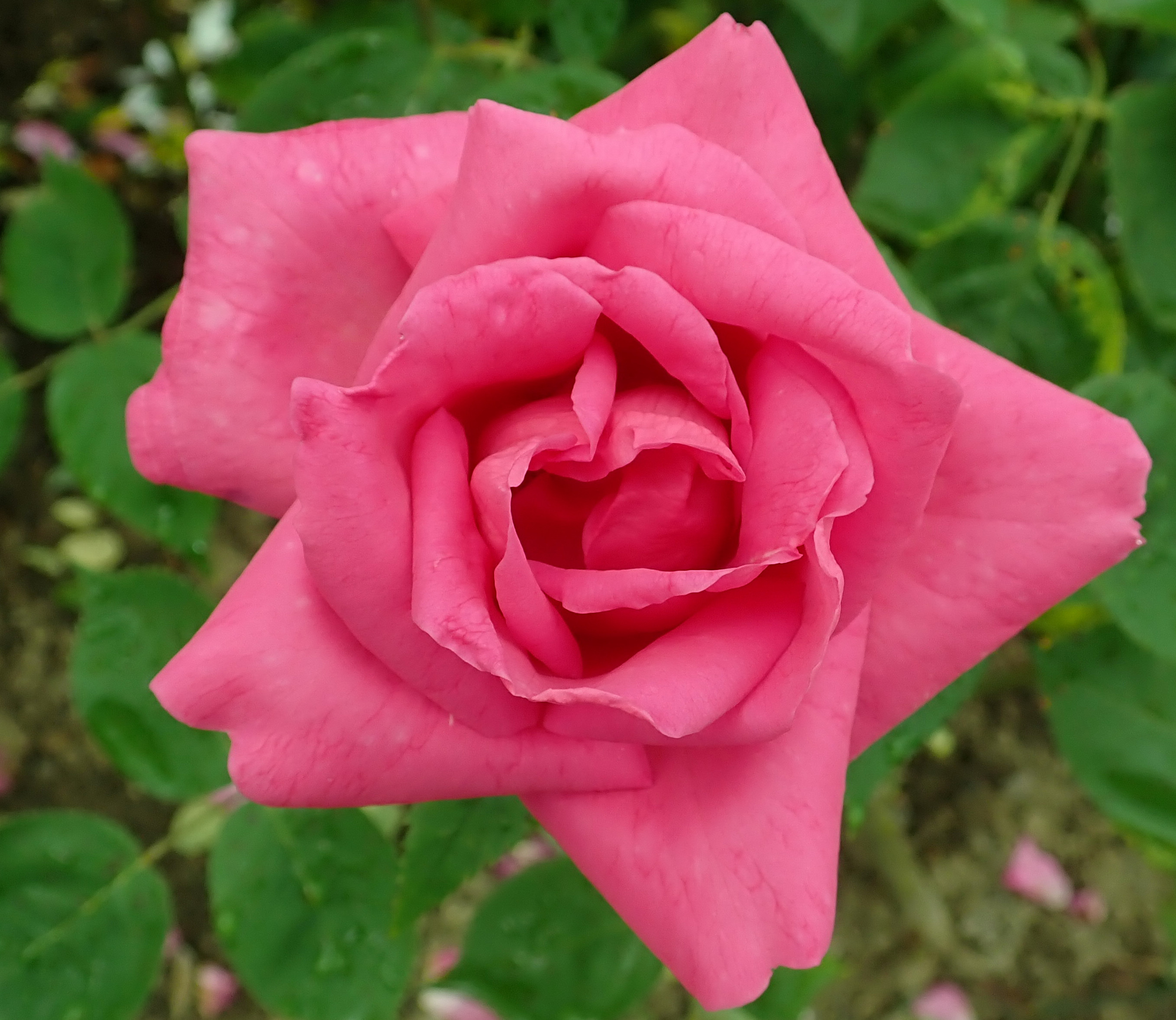
- Rosa Canterbury'
- Genus: Rosa hybrid
- Hybrid parentage: ('Constance Spry' x 'Monique') x 'Unnamed Seedling'
- Cultivar group: Shrub rose
- Cultivar: 'AUSbury'
- Breeder: David C. H. Austin
- Origin: Great Britain, 1969

Rosa 'Canterbury' (a.k.a. AUSbury) is a medium pink shrub rose cultivar, bred by British rose breeder David C. H. Austin, and introduced into the UK by David Austin Roses Limited (UK) in 1969. 'Canterbury' is named for the eleventh century Canterbury Cathedral in Kent, England where Thomas Becket was murdered in 1170.

== Description ==
'Canterbury' is a medium-tall, bushy shrub rose, 3 to 5 ft (0.91–1.52 m) in height, with a 3 to 4 ft (0.91–1.22 m) spread. It has a mild fragrance. The flowers are large, 4 to 5 in (100–130 mm), with a semi-double bloom form. 'Canterbury' will sometimes repeat its flowering later in the season. The plant has a lax, rounded growing habit and dark green leaves. It is susceptible to mildew and rust. 'Canterbury' is not a fast grower. It often takes a few years to develop and produce abundant flowers.

== History ==
=== David Austin roses ===
David C. H. Austin (1926–2018) was an award-winning rose breeder, nursery owner and writer from Shropshire, England. When he was young, he was attracted to the beauty of old garden roses, especially the Gallicas, the Centifolias and the Damasks, which were popular in nineteenth century France. Austin began breeding roses in the 1950s with the goal of creating new shrub rose varieties that would possess the best qualities of old garden roses while incorporating the long flowering characteristics of hybrid tea roses and floribundas.

His first commercially successful rose cultivar was 'Constance Spry', which he introduced in 1961. He created a new, informal class of roses in the 1960s, which he named "English Roses". Austin's roses are generally known today as "David Austin Roses". Austin attained international commercial success with his new rose varieties. Some of his most popular roses include 'Wife of Bath' (1969), 'Graham Thomas' (1983), 'Abraham Darby' (1985) and 'Gertrude Jekyll' (1986).

=== 'Canterbury' ===
Austin developed 'Canterbury' by crossing ('Constance Spry' x 'Monique') and an 'Unnamed Seedling'. The cultivar was introduced into the UK by David Austin Roses Limited (UK) in 1969. The rose was named for the 11th century Canterbury Cathedral in Kent, England. Thomas Becket was murdered at the cathedral in 1170.
