= Rosa 'The Ancient Mariner' =

Pink shrub rose cultivar

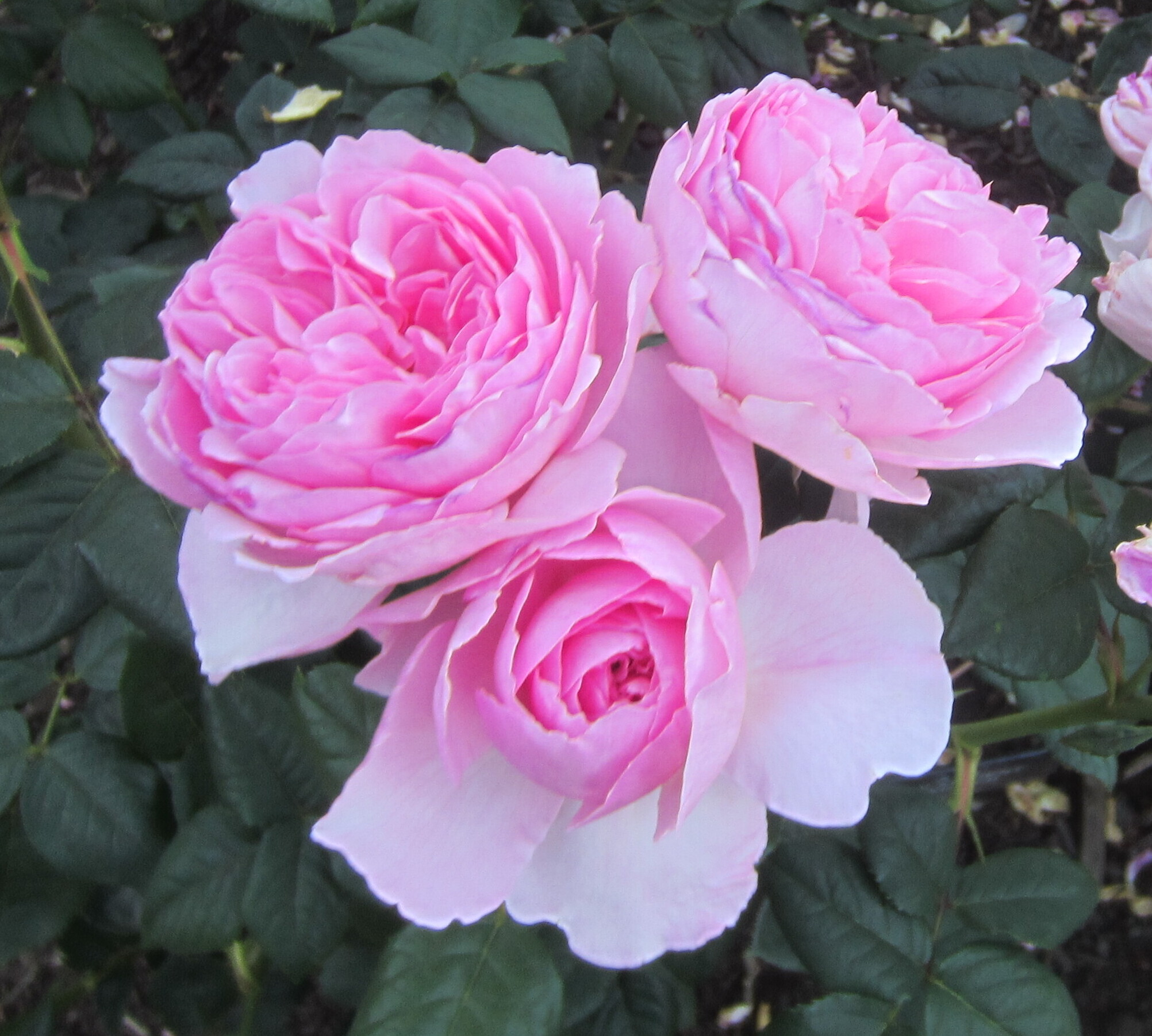
- Rosa 'The Ancient Mariner'
- Genus: Rosa hybrid
- Cultivar group: Shrub rose
- Cultivar: 'AUSoutcry'
- Breeder: David C. H. Austin
- Origin: Great Britain, 2015

Rosa 'The Ancient Mariner' (aka AUSoutcry) is a pink shrub rose cultivar, developed by British rose breeder David C. H. Austin before 2011 and introduced into the UK by David Austin Roses Limited (UK) in 2015. The rose was named for Samuel Taylor Coleridge’s famous poem, The Rime of the Ancient Mariner.

== Description ==
'The Ancient Mariner' is a medium-tall bushy shrub rose, 4 to 5 ft (1.2–1.5 m) in height, with a 3 to 4 ft (0.91–1.22 m) spread. The rose has a strong myrrh scent. Its flowers are 3 to 4 in (76–102 mm) in diameter, with a very full (40+ petals) cupped bloom form. The plant has large, oval buds. Bloom colour is medium pink with lighter pink at the edges. Flowers are carried in clusters. Leaves are medium in size and light green. The rose blooms in flushes throughout the growing season.

== History ==
=== David Austin roses ===
David C. H. Austin (1926–2018) was an award-winning rose breeder, nursery owner and writer from Shropshire, England. When he was young, he was attracted to the beauty of old garden roses, especially the Gallicas, the Centifolias and the Damasks, which were popular in nineteenth century France. Austin began breeding roses in the 1950s with the goal of creating new shrub rose varieties that would possess the best qualities of old garden roses while incorporating the long flowering characteristics of hybrid tea roses and floribundas.

His first commercially successful rose cultivar was 'Constance Spry', which he introduced in 1961. He created a new, informal class of roses in the 1960s, which he named "English Roses". Austin's roses are generally known today as "David Austin Roses". Austin attained international commercial success with his new rose varieties. Some of his most popular roses include 'Wife of Bath' (1969), 'Graham Thomas' (1983), 'Abraham Darby' (1985) and 'Gertrude Jekyll' (1986).

=== 'The Ancient Mariner' ===
Austin developed 'The Ancient Mariner' cultivar before 2011 by crossing unnamed, non-patented parents. The rose was named for Samuel Taylor Coleridge’s famous poem, The Rime of the Ancient Mariner. It was introduced into the UK by David Austin Roses Limited (UK) in 2015.
