= Rosa 'The Squire' =

Crimson-red shrub rose cultivar

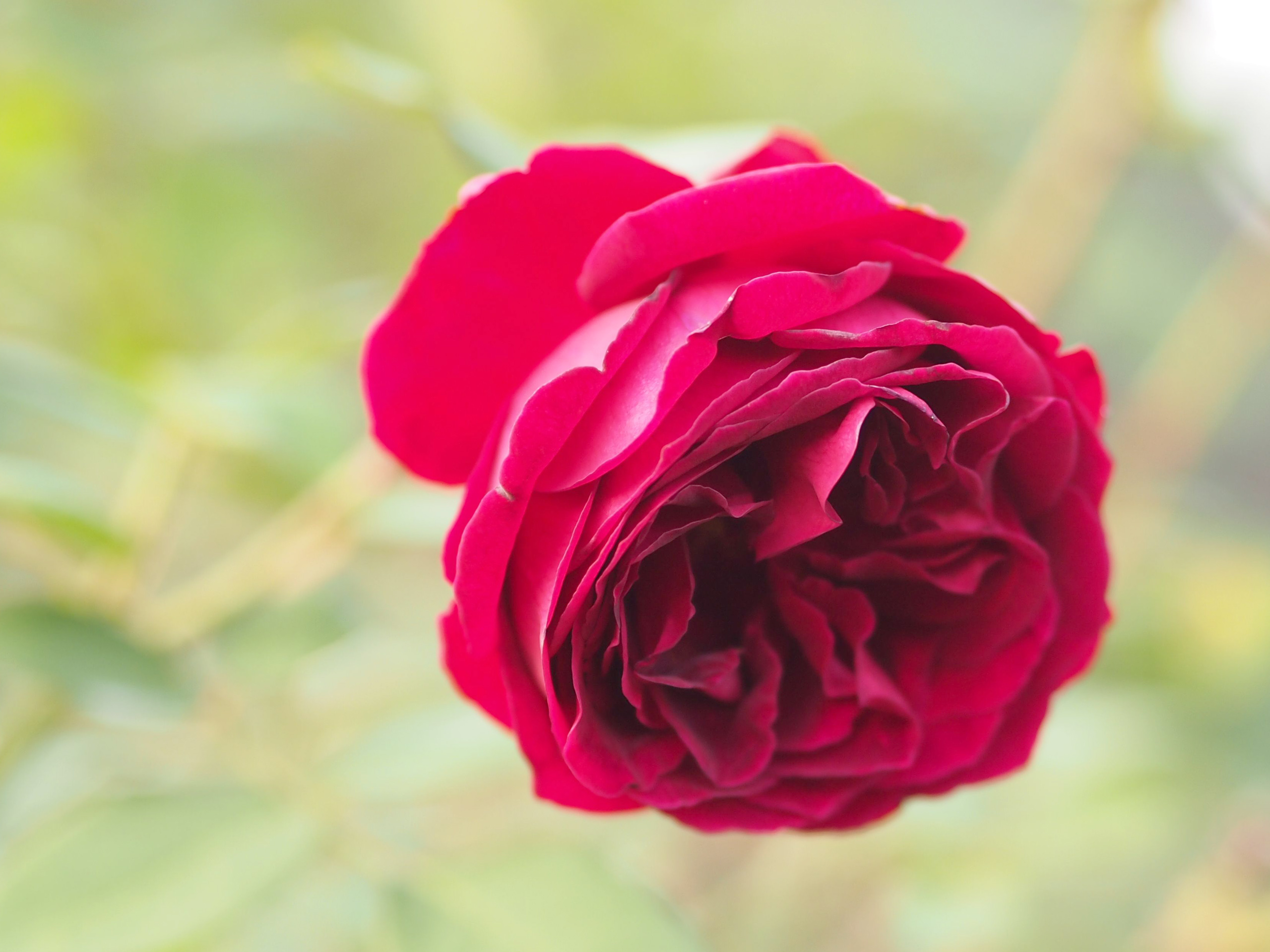
- Rosa 'The Squire'
- Genus: Rosa hybrid
- Hybrid parentage: 'The Knight' x 'Chateau de Clos Vougeot'
- Cultivar group: Shrub rose
- Cultivar: 'AUSquire'
- Breeder: David C. H. Austin
- Origin: Great Britain, 1976

Rosa 'The Squire' (aka AUSquire) is a crimson shrub rose, bred by British rose breeder, David C. H. Austin in 1976. It was widely praised as the best crimson rose of Austin's English Roses collection, when it was first introduced.

== Description ==
'The Squire' is an upright, open shrub rose, 3.5 to 5 ft (1.1–1.5 m) in height, with a 3 to 4 ft (0.91–1.22 m) spread. Medium-sized, double (120) petals are mildly cupped and rosette-shaped. The flowers are borne singly or in clusters of 1–5. Short, fat buds open to flowers that are bright crimson with darker red-black hues. The flowers fade to a dark pink colour and very quickly in very hot weather. 'The Squire' has a strong, old rose fragrance. It also has dull, dark green foliage and many prickles. This rose is a better repeat bloomer than Austin's other early roses and is prone to mildew.

== History ==
=== David Austin roses ===
David C. H. Austin (1926 – 2018) was an award-winning rose breeder, nursery owner and writer from Shropshire, England. He began breeding roses in the 1950s with the goal of creating new shrub rose varieties that would possess the best qualities of old-fashioned roses while incorporating the long flowering characteristics of hybrid tea roses and floribundas. His first commercially successful rose cultivar was 'Constance Spry', which he introduced in 1961. He created a new, informal class of roses in the 1960s, which he named "English Roses". Austin's roses are generally known today as "David Austin Roses". Austin attained international commercial success with his new rose varieties. Some of his most popular roses include 'Wife of Bath' (1969), 'Graham Thomas' (1983), and 'Abraham Darby' (1985)

=== 'The Squire' ===
Austin developed 'The Squire' by crossing 'The Knight' and 'Chateau de Clos Vougeot' in 1976. Both parents were chosen for their deep crimson flowers, but both are considered weak growers. 'The Knight', one of Austin's roses, was later discontinued. When 'The Squire' was first introduced, it was praised "as the perfect new 'old' crimson rose." Since its introduction, it has been replaced by better new "old" Austin roses. 'The Squire' was used to hybridize four child plants, 'Fisherman's Friend' (Austin, 1987), 'L. D. Braithwaite', (Austin, 1988), 'Othello' (Austin, 1986) and 'The Prince' (Austin, 1990).

== Sources ==
- Quest-Ritson, Brigid; Quest-Ritson, Charles (1993). Encyclopedia of Roses. DK Publishing. ISBN 978-0756688684.
- Phillips, Roger; Rix, Martyn (1993). The Quest for the Rose. New York: Random House. ISBN 978-0-679-43573-0.
