= Rosa 'Golden Celebration' =

Yellow shrub rose cultivar

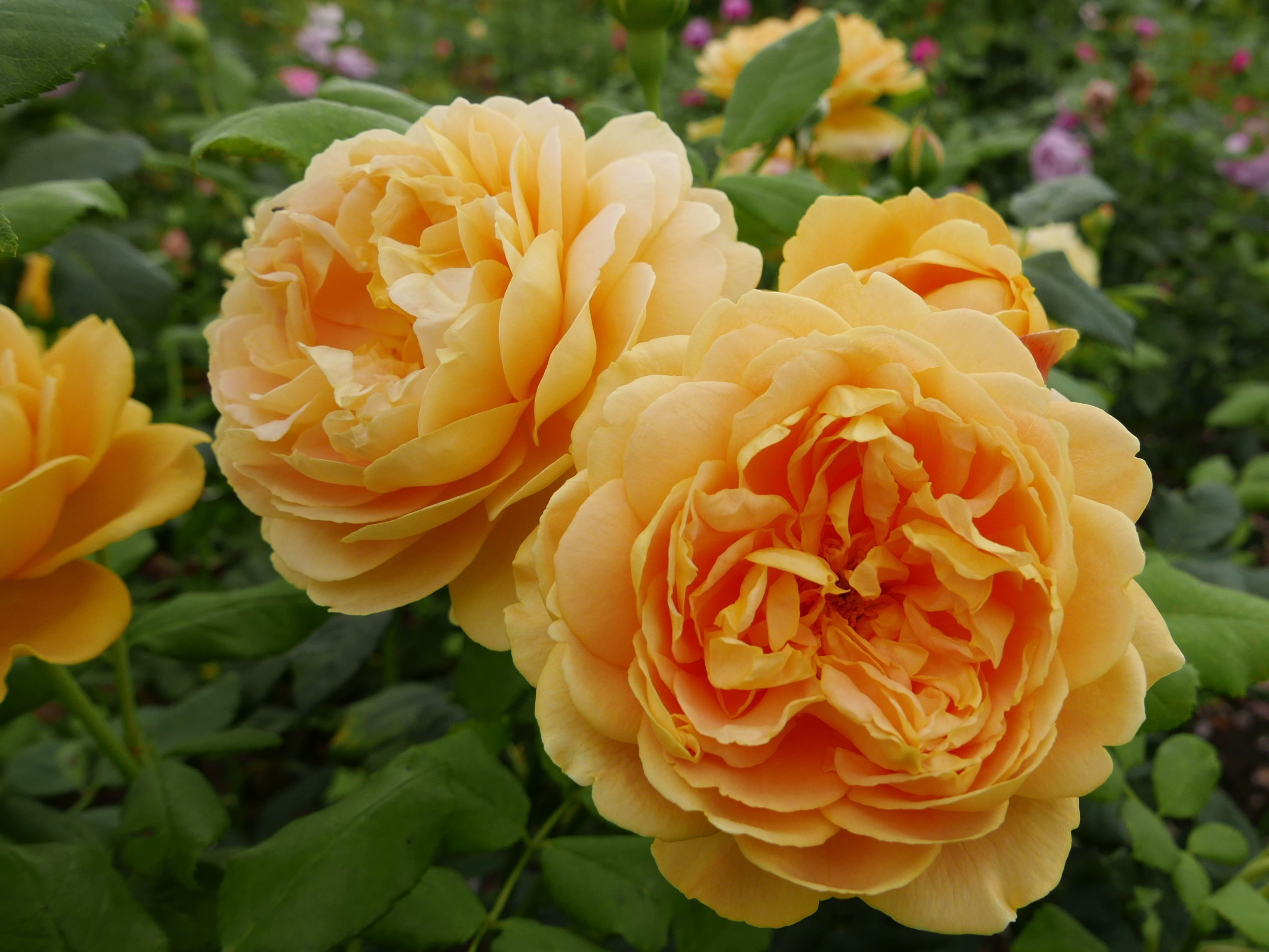
- Rosa 'Golden Celebration'
- Genus: Rosa hybrid
- Hybrid parentage: 'Charles Austin' x 'Abraham Darby'
- Cultivar group: Shrub rose
- Cultivar: 'AUSgold'
- Breeder: David C. H. Austin
- Origin: Great Britain, 1992

Rosa 'Golden Celebration' (a.k.a. AUSgold) is a yellow shrub rose cultivar, bred by British rose breeder, David C. H. Austin. It was introduced into the UK by David Austin Roses Limited (UK) in 1992. 'Golden Celebration' is part of the David Austin English Rose Collection. It was awarded the Royal Horticultural Society's Award of Garden Merit in 2001.

== Description ==
'Golden Celebration' is a medium-tall bushy shrub rose, 4 to 5 ft (1.2–1.5 m) in height, with a 3 to 4 ft (0.91–1.22 m) spread. It has a strong, fruity fragrance. The flowers are large, 4 to 5 in (100–130 mm), and very full (40+ petals). Rounded, orange-red buds open to deep yellow cupped flowers with apricot centers. They are sometimes carried singly, but are primarily borne in small clusters of 3–7. The rose blooms in flushes throughout the season. It has large, medium green foliage, nearly thornless stems and a lax growing habit. It is fairly disease resistant, but is susceptible to blackspot. 'Golden Celebration' does well in hot climates, where it will reach 6 ft (1.8 m) in height.

== History ==
=== David Austin roses ===
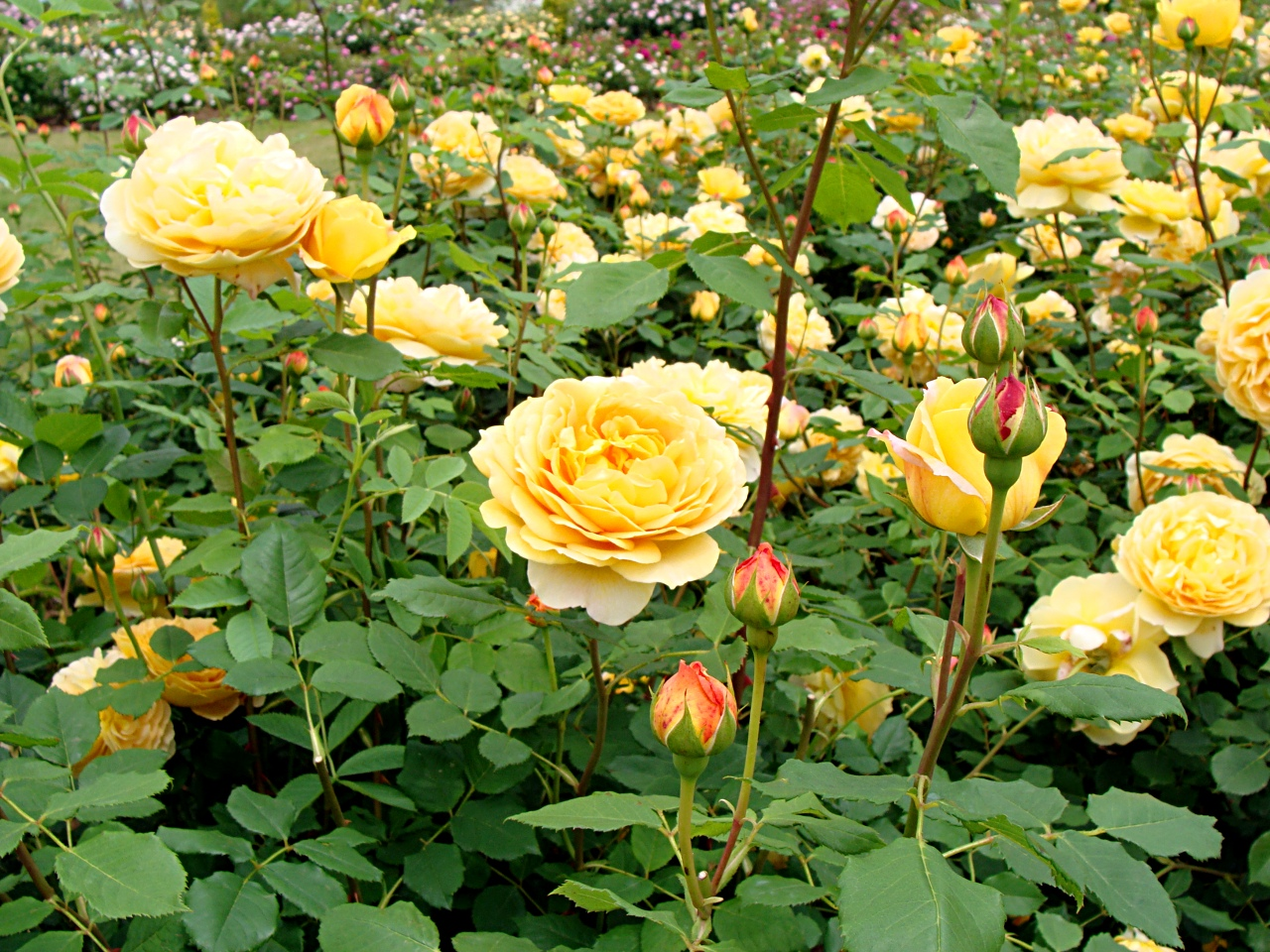
'Golden Celebration'

David C. H. Austin (1926 – 2018) was an award-winning rose breeder, nursery owner and writer from Shropshire, England. He began breeding roses in the 1950s with the goal of creating new shrub rose varieties that would possess the best qualities of old-fashioned roses while incorporating the long flowering characteristics of hybrid tea roses and floribundas. His first commercially successful rose cultivar was 'Constance Spry', which he introduced in 1961. He created a new, informal class of roses in the 1960s, which he named "English Roses". Austin's roses are generally known today as "David Austin Roses". Austin attained international commercial success with his new rose varieties. Some of his most popular roses include 'Wife of Bath' (1969), 'Graham Thomas' (1983), 'Abraham Darby' (1985) and 'Gertrude Jekyll' (1986).

=== 'Golden Celebration' ===
Austin developed 'Golden Celebration' using the apricot shrub roses, 'Charles Austin' x 'Abraham Darby'. The cultivar was introduced into the UK by David Austin Roses Limited (UK) in 1992. The rose is part of the David Austin English Rose Collection, and is one of the largest-flowered English Roses. 'Golden Celebration' was awarded the Royal Horticultural Society's Award of Garden Merit in 2001. The rose cultivar was used to hybridize five child plants: 'The Alnwick Rose' (2001), 'Crocus Rose' (2000), 'Jubilee Celebration' (2002), 'Portlandia' (2002) and 'Golden Zest' (2005).

== Sources ==
- Quest-Ritson, Brigid; Quest-Ritson, Charles (2003). Encyclopedia of Roses. DK Publishing. ISBN 978-0756688684.
- Phillips, Roger; Rix, Martyn (1993). The Quest for the Rose. New York: Random House. ISBN 978-0-679-43573-0.
