= Rosa 'Gertrude Jekyll' =

Pink shrub rose cultivar

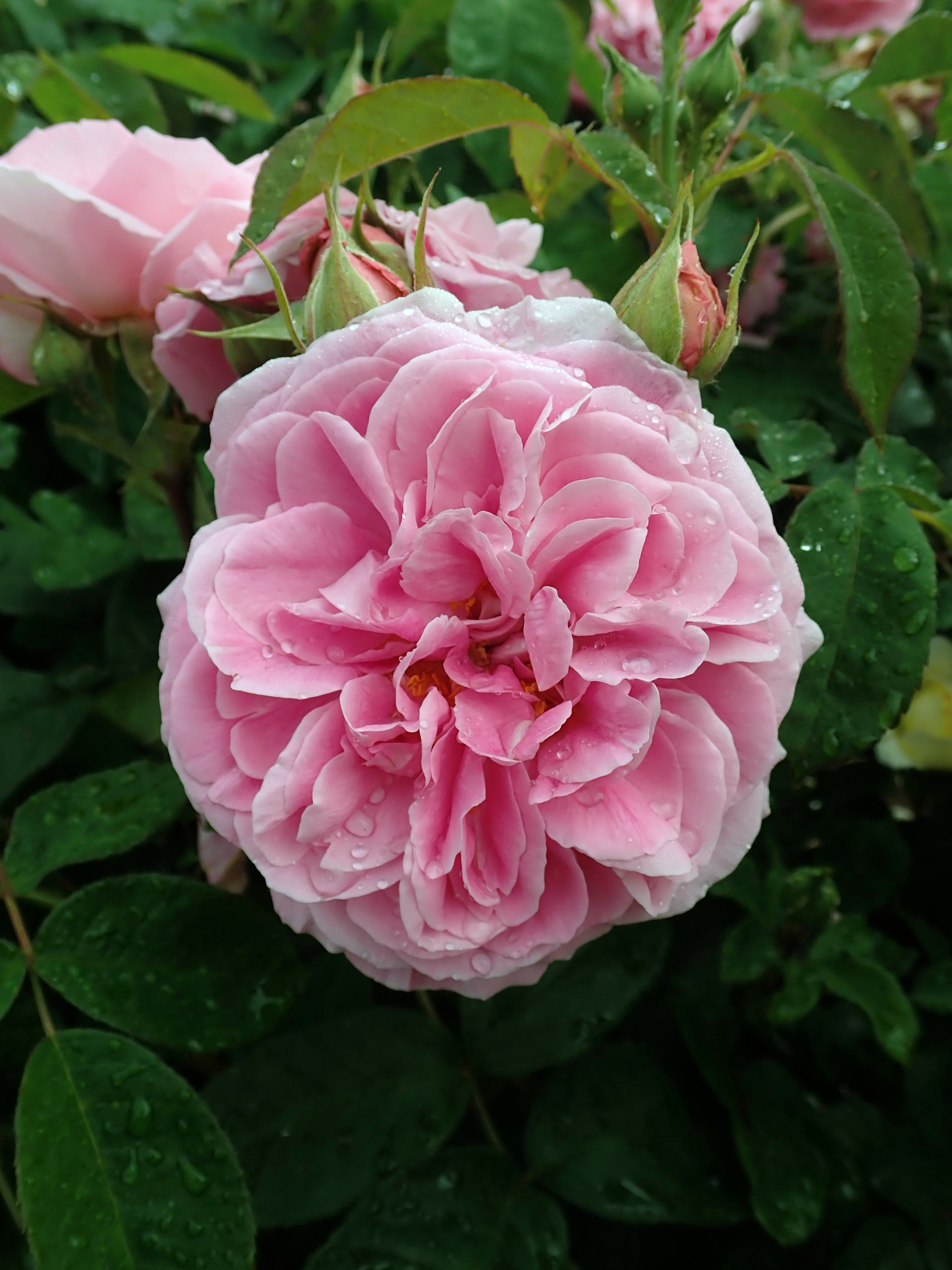
- Rosa 'Gertrude Jekyll'
- Genus: Rosa hybrid
- Hybrid parentage: 'Wife of Bath' x 'Comte de Chambord'
- Cultivar group: Shrub rose
- Cultivar: 'AUSbord'
- Breeder: David C. H. Austin
- Origin: Great Britain, 1986

Rosa 'Gertrude Jekyll' (aka AUSbord) is a pink shrub rose cultivar, bred by British rose breeder, David C. H. Austin in 1986. It was named in honour of the famous British writer and garden designer, Gertrude Jekyll (1843–1932). 'Gertrude Jekyll' is one of the most popular of the David Austin's English roses. It was awarded the Royal Horticultural Society's Award of Garden Merit in 1994.

== Description ==
'Gertrude Jekyl' is a tall bushy shrub rose, 6 to 9 ft (1.8–2.7 m) in height, with a 3 to 4 ft (0.91–1.22 m) spread. It has a fully double, quartered bloom form and a strong, old rose fragrance. The flowers are large, 4 to 5 in (100–130 mm), and are bright pink with a light red center, fading to pale pink at the edges. They are borne in small clusters of 3–5. The plant has long, pointed, dark green foliage and prickles. 'Gertrude Jekyll' is a vigorous grower and a repeat bloomer during the season. It can reach 9 ft (2.7 m) in height in hot climates and can be grown as a short climber.

== History ==
=== David Austin roses ===
David C. H. Austin (1926 – 2018) was an award-winning rose breeder, nursery owner and writer from Shropshire, England. He began breeding roses in the 1950s with the goal of creating new shrub rose varieties that would possess the best qualities of old-fashioned roses while incorporating the long flowering characteristics of hybrid tea roses and floribundas. His first commercially successful rose cultivar was 'Constance Spry', which he introduced in 1961. He created a new, informal class of roses in the 1960s, which he named "English Roses". Austin's roses are generally known today as "David Austin Roses". Austin attained international commercial success with his new rose varieties. Some of his most popular roses include 'Wife of Bath' (1969), 'Canterbury' (1969), and 'Abraham Darby' (1985)

=== 'Gertrude Jekyll' ===
Austin developed 'Gertrude Jekyll' using the shrub rose, 'Wife of Bath' and the Portland rose, 'Comte de Chambord'. The rose was named in honour of the famous British writer and garden designer, Gertrude Jekyll (1843–1932). It is one of the most popular of the David Austin's English roses. It was awarded the Royal Horticultural Society's Award of Garden Merit in 2012.

== Sources ==
- Quest-Ritson, Brigid; Quest-Ritson, Charles (2003). Encyclopedia of Roses. DK Publishing. ISBN 978-0756688684.
- Phillips, Roger; Rix, Martyn (1993). The Quest for the Rose. New York: Random House. ISBN 978-0-679-43573-0.
