= Rosa 'Wife of Bath' =

Rose cultivar

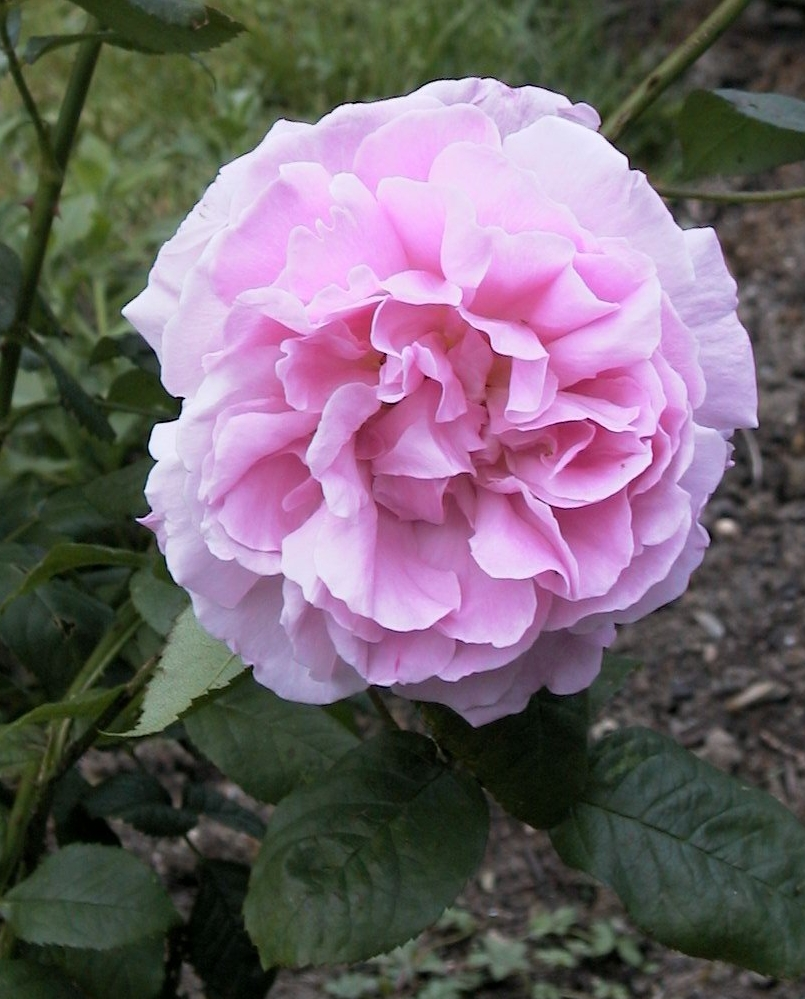
- Hybrid parentage: 'Mme Caroline Testout' × ('Ma Perkins' × 'Constance Spry')
- Cultivar group: Modern shrub / English rose
- Cultivar: 'Wife of Bath'
- Marketing names: 'AUSbath', 'Auswife', 'Glücksburg', 'Rosarium Glücksburg', 'The Wife of Bath'
- Breeder: David Austin
- Origin: England, 1969

Rosa 'Wife of Bath' (a.k.a. AUSbath), is a pink shrub rose cultivar developed by David C.H. Austin in England in 1969. It was one of his early cultivars and is named after a character from Geoffrey Chaucer's The Canterbury Tales.

== History ==
=== David Austin roses ===
David C. H. Austin (1926 – 2018) was an award-winning rose breeder, nursery owner and writer from Shropshire, England. He began breeding roses in the 1950s with the goal of creating new shrub rose varieties that would possess the best qualities of old-fashioned roses while incorporating the long flowering characteristics of hybrid tea roses and floribundas. His first commercially successful rose cultivar was 'Constance Spry', which he introduced in 1961. He created a new, informal class of roses in the 1960s, which he named "English Roses". Austin's roses are generally known today as "David Austin Roses". Austin attained international commercial success with his new rose varieties. Some of his most popular roses include 'Wife of Bath' (1969), 'Canterbury' (1969), and 'Abraham Darby' (1985)

=== 'Wife of Bath' ===
'Wife of Bath' and 'Canterbury', the second cultivar Austin named in honour of the English author Geoffrey Chaucer in 1969, were the first repeat flowering varieties in his English Rose Collection. The rose cultivar was created from Joseph Pernet-Ducher's pink hybrid tea 'Madame Caroline Testout' (introduced in 1890) and a cross between the floribunda 'Ma Perkins' (Boerner, 1952) and Austin's first English rose 'Constance Spry' (introduced in 1961). David Austin used the cultivar in the development of several new English roses, including 'Gertrude Jekyll' (1986), 'Pretty Jessica' (1983) and 'Scepter'd Isle' (1989).

== Description ==
'Wife of Bath' has old-fashioned medium-sized flowers with an average diameter of 7 centimetres (2.8 in), and up to 55 petals. They develop from red round buds, and have a strong, sweet fragrance of myrrh. The slightly cupped bloom form is double to very full with many small, informally arranged petals in the middle of the flower. The center is deep pink, and contrasts with the paler reverse and the outer petals, that fade to very pale pink. They grow in clusters of 3–9, and appear continuously from early June throughout the summer.

The robust shrub grows densely and remains rather small, reaching only about 80 to 120 centimeters (2.5 to 4 ft) height at a width of 60 to 90 centimeters (2 to 3 ft).The arching shoots bear small, matte, medium green leaves. 'Wife of Bath' is disease resistant and winter hardy down to −23 °C (USDA zone 6 and warmer), and half shade tolerant. The variety is grown on its own roots and can be planted solitary, in groups, or as hedges, but is also suitable as container plant and as cut flower. Due to its size and floriferousness, the cultivar is well suited for small gardens.
