= Rosa 'Constance Spry' =

Rose cultivar

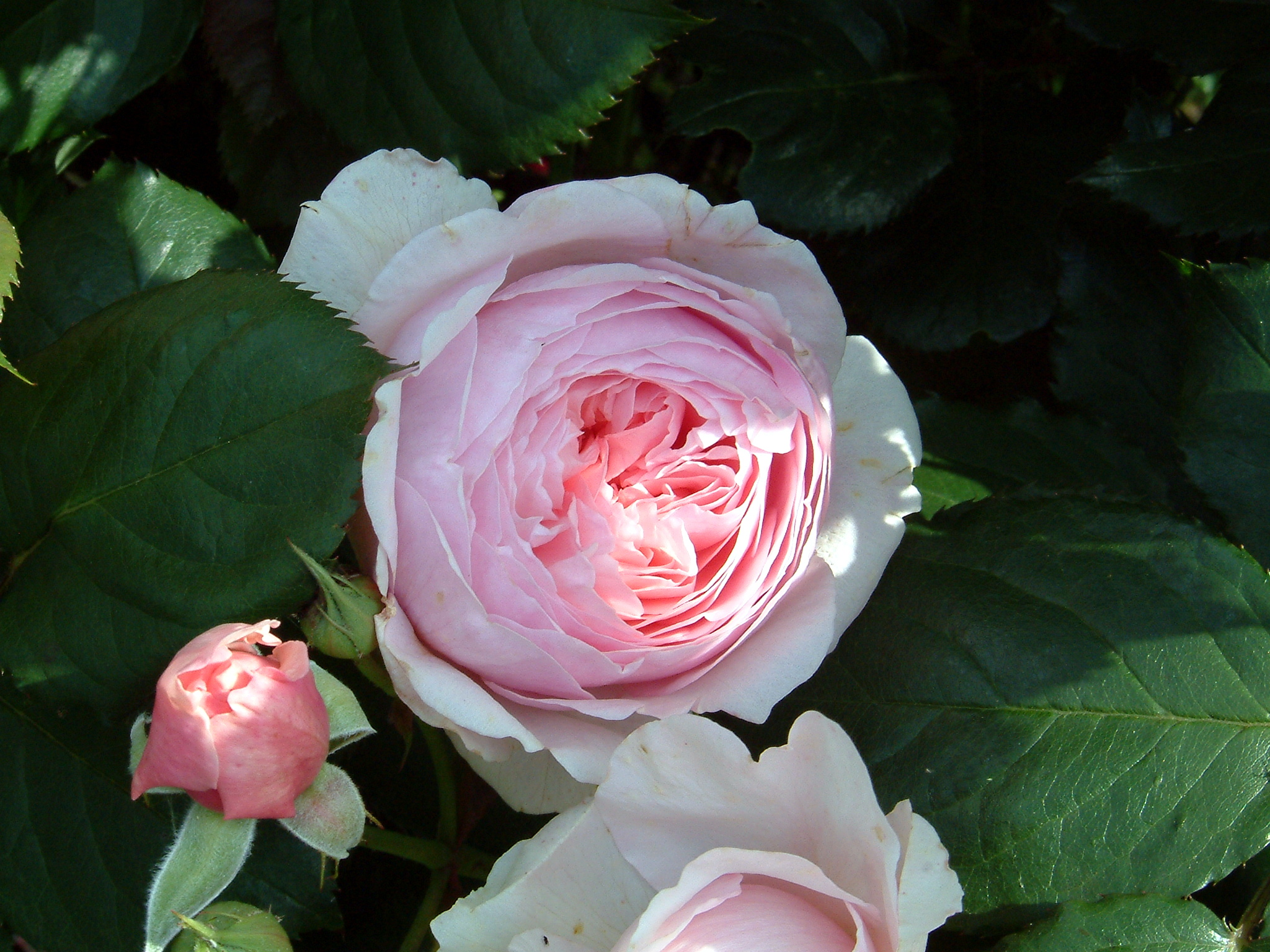
- Genus: Rosa hybrid
- Hybrid parentage: Rosa 'Dainty Maid' × 'Rosa 'Belle Isis
- Cultivar group: Modern shrub / English rose
- Cultivar: 'Constance Spry'
- Marketing names: AUSfirst, AUStance
- Breeder: David C.H. Austin
- Origin: Great Britain, 1961

Rosa 'Constance Spry' is a light pink shrub rose introduced into Great Britain in 1961. It is the first rose cultivar commercially developed by British rose breeder, David C.H. Austin. 'Constance Spry' was introduced at a time when the shrub rose was out of style, the hybrid tea rose being the most popular rose with gardeners. The new cultivar renewed the popularity of the more old fashioned type of rose.

== Description ==
'Constance Spry' is a vigorous, spreading shrub, 8 to 20 ft (243–609 cm) in height, with a 6 to 8 ft spread (182–243 cm). It has been described as a "lanky grower", and can be trained as a climber or grown to form as a large shrub. It blooms in clusters of medium to large, fully double flowers, which are cupped and globular in shape. The blooms are pale pink on the outside, and a deeper, darker pink within. The rose is noted for its strong, distinctive "myrrh like" scent, a characteristic inherited by many of its descendants. It blooms once a year for four weeks in late spring or early summer. The plant has abundant foliage and flexible canes that are easy to train.

== History ==
'Constance Spry' was the first rose developed commercially by David C.H. Austin, an amateur rose breeder at the time, living in Shropshire, England. Austin was interested in developing new rose cultivars that would look and smell like old fashioned roses. One of his early successes was crossing the Gallica rose, Rosa 'Belle Isis', and the floribunda, Rosa 'Dainty Maid'. Among the resulting seedlings was a strong, sweet smelling rose with large pink flowers. Austin showed the new cultivar to his friend and legendary horticulturalist, Graham Thomas, who showed the rose to Hillings Nursery. The nursery introduced the new cultivar in 1961. 'Constance Spry' is considered the first of the modern "English Roses".

Developed at a time when the hybrid tea rose was the most common style marketed to gardeners, the success of 'Constance Spry' renewed the popularity of a more old fashioned type of rose. The rose is named after gardening educator, author, and florist Constance Spry. Spry collected old roses from the 1930s and 1940s, and traveled extensively through Britain during World War II, giving talks to women's groups on gardening and flower arranging. She was a talented flower arranger and wrote many popular books on the subject.

Despite its only once a year flowering, the charm of 'Constance Spry's old fashioned appearance proved popular enough to prove there was a market for "reproduction" style roses. Austin continued his breeding program with 'Constance Spry' was further crossed with both modern and older roses, resulting in the fully remontant Rosa 'Wife of Bath' (1969), Rosa 'The Yeoman', 1969 and Rosa 'Chaucer' (1970), from which many of his later roses descended. 'Constance Spry' was awarded the Royal Horticultural Society's Award of Garden Merit in 1993.

== Gallery ==
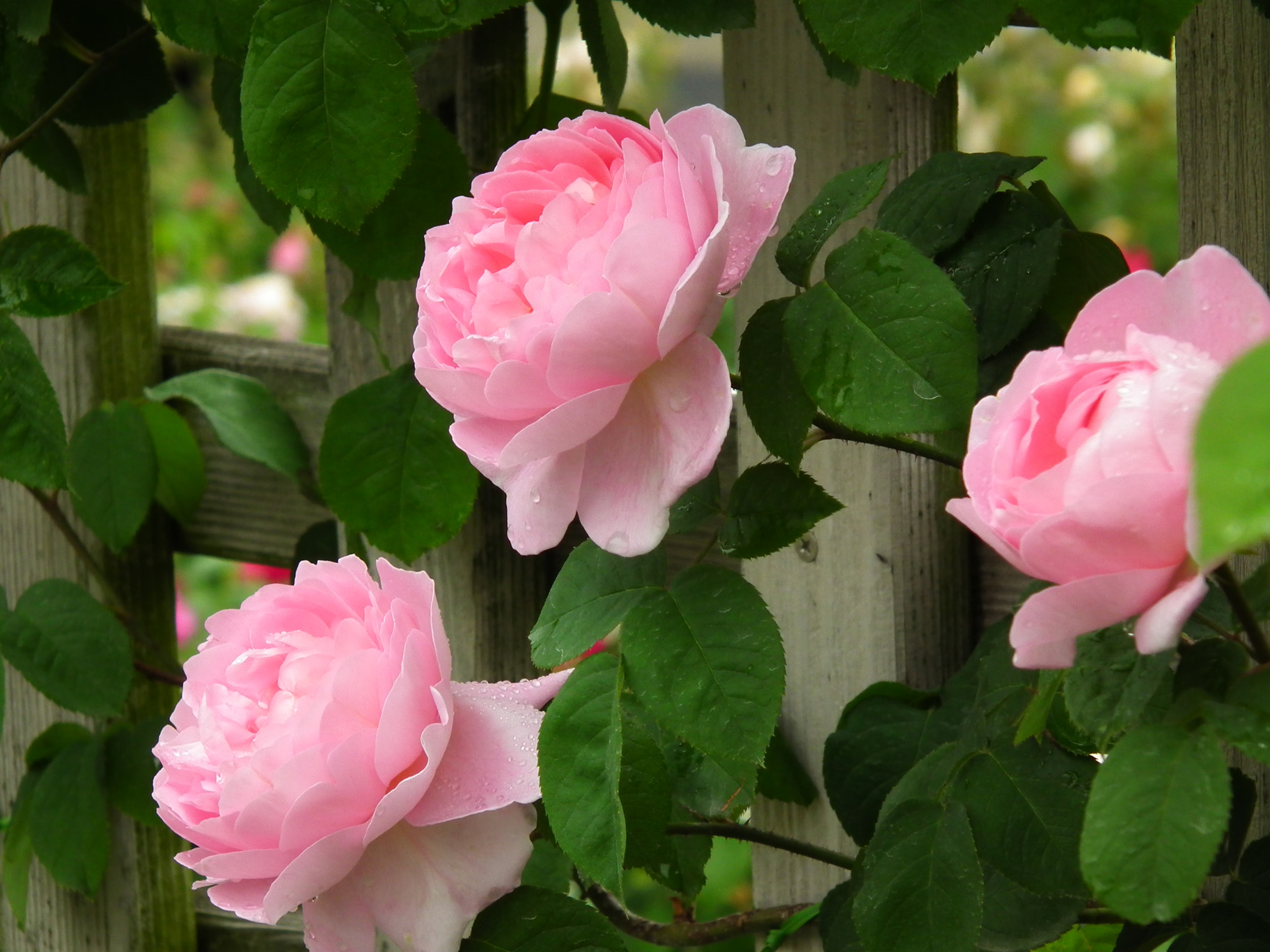
'Constance Spry' (2011)

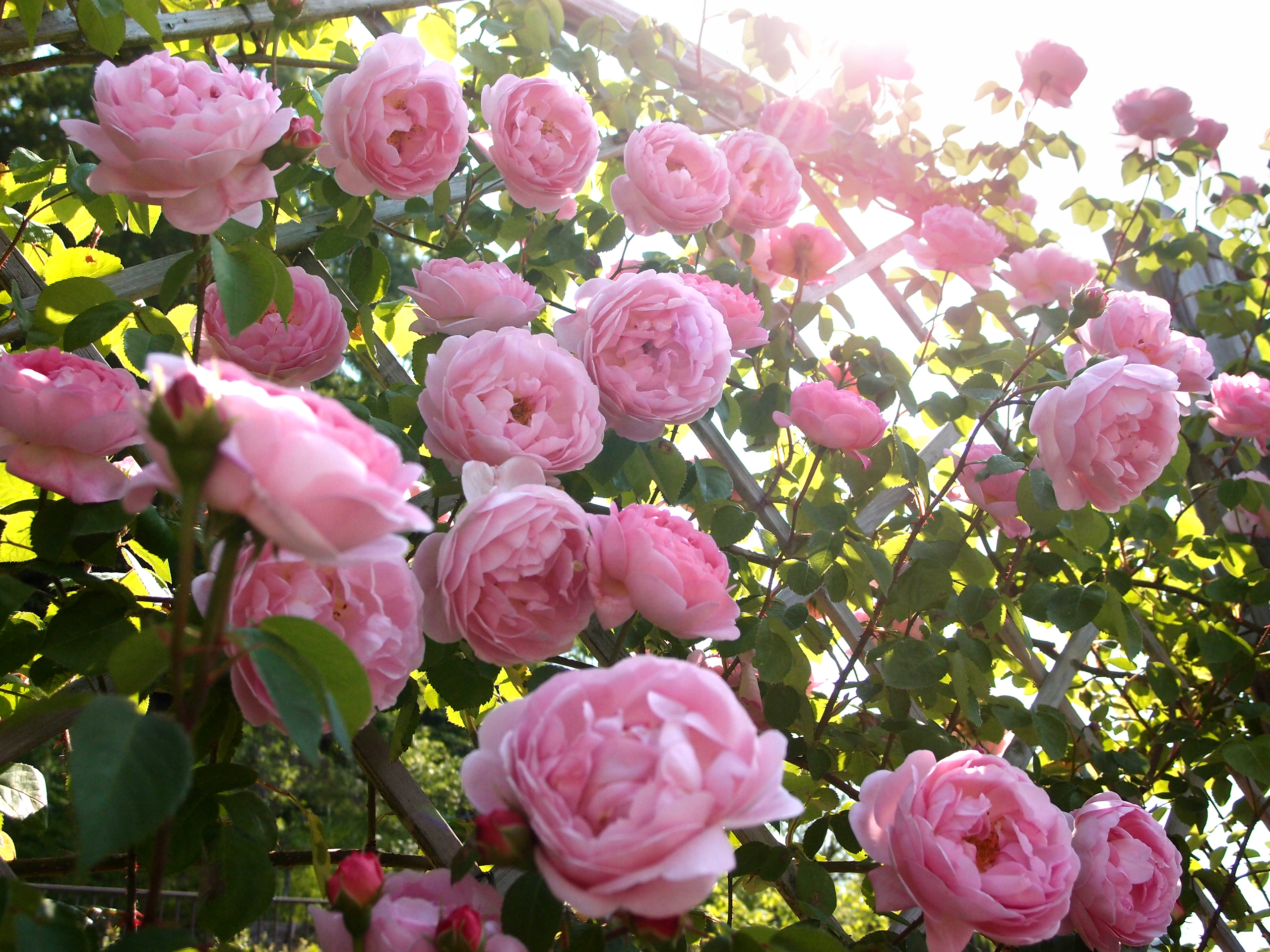
'Constance Spry' (2012)

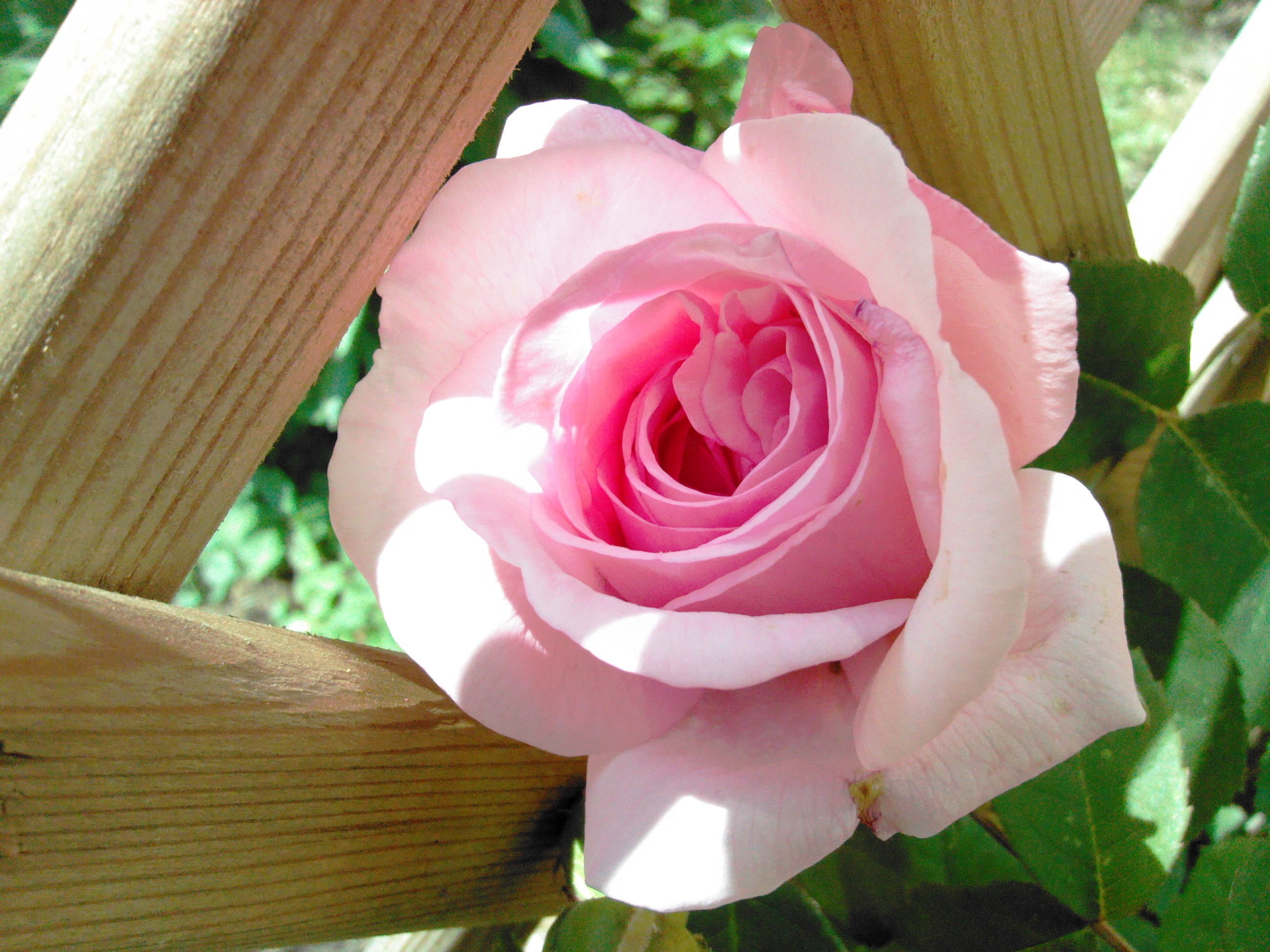
'Constance Spry' (2002)

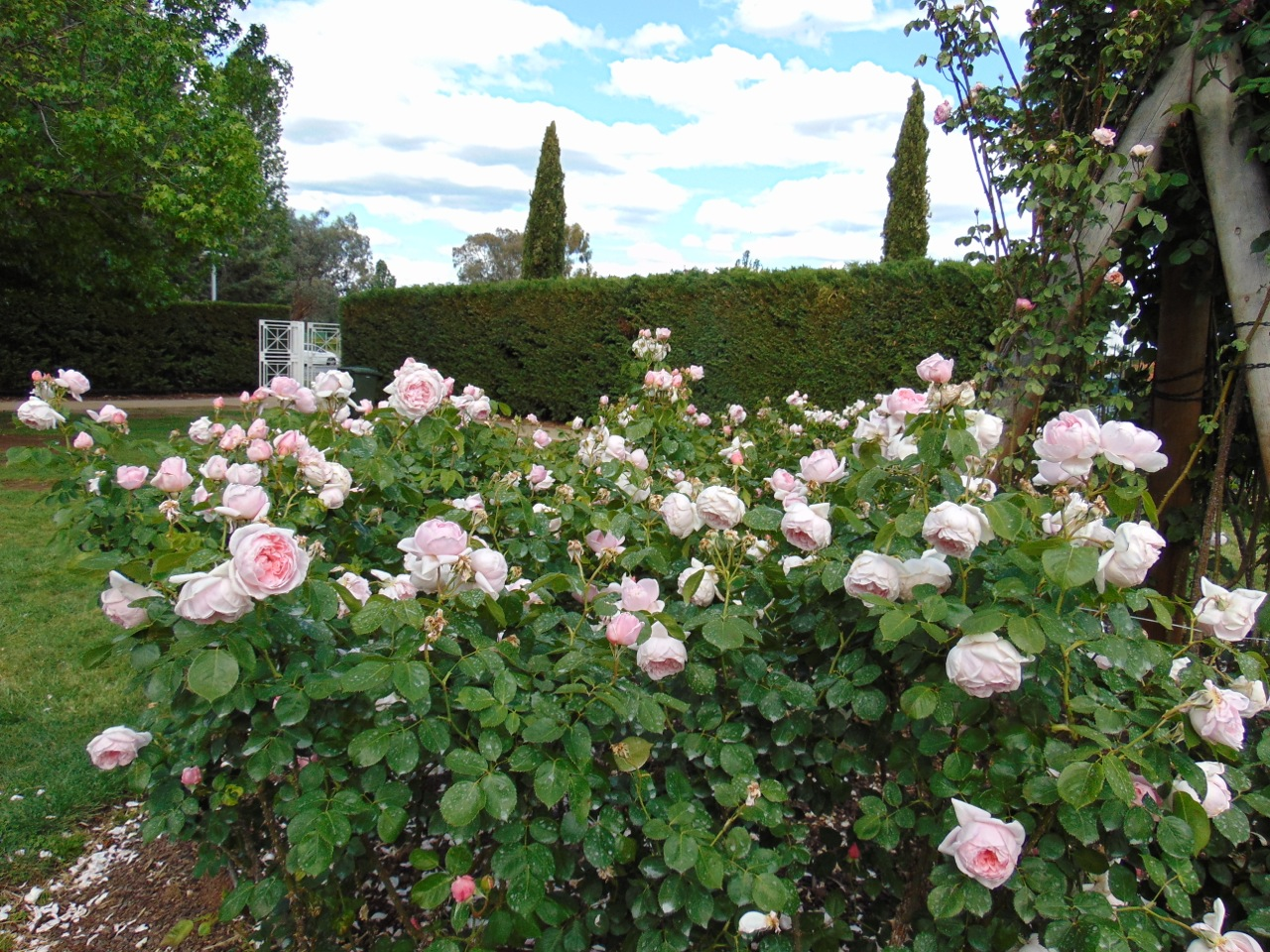
'Constance Spry' (2017)

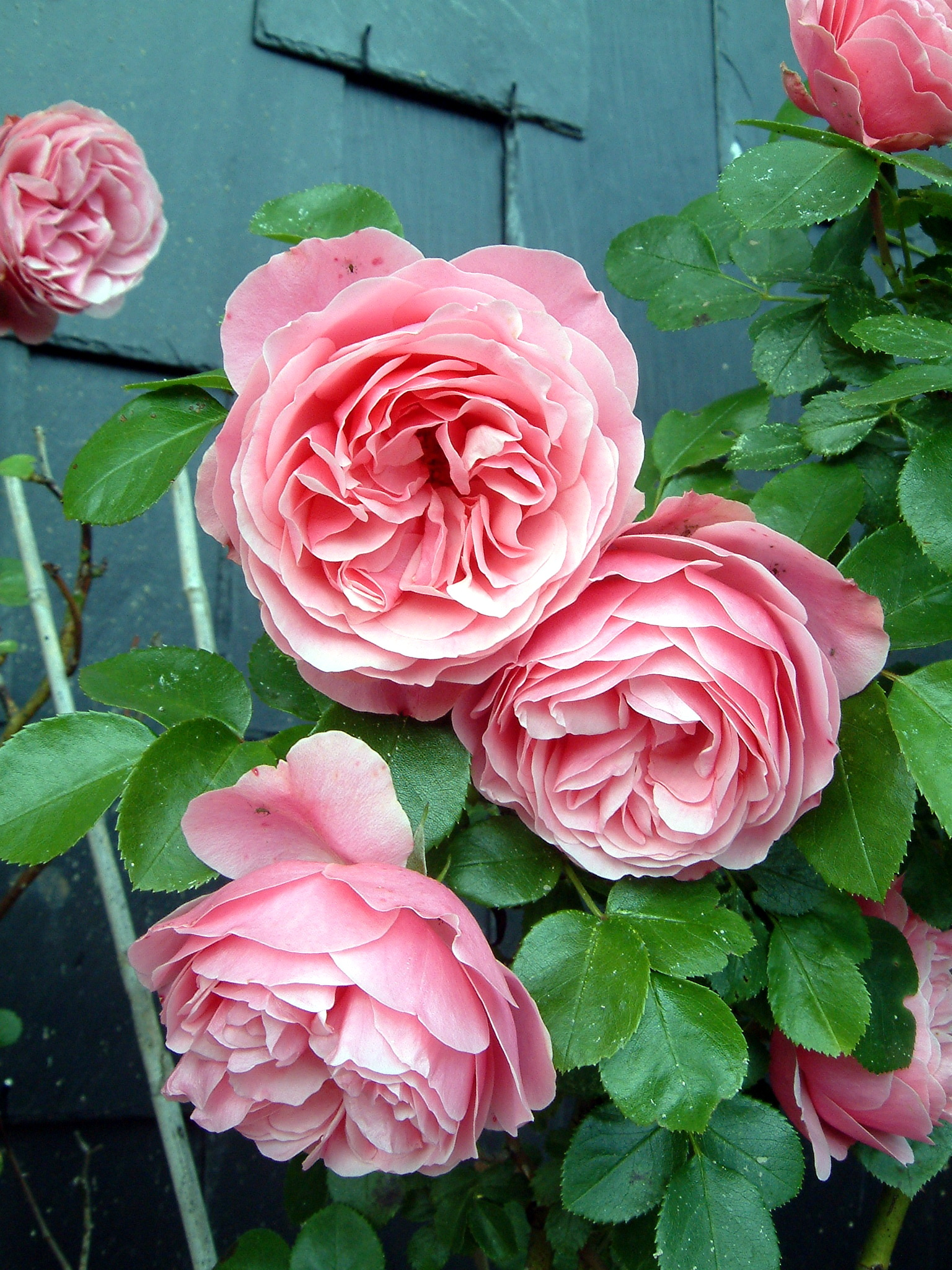
'Constance Spry' (2004)
