= Rosa 'Abraham Darby' =

Rose cultivar

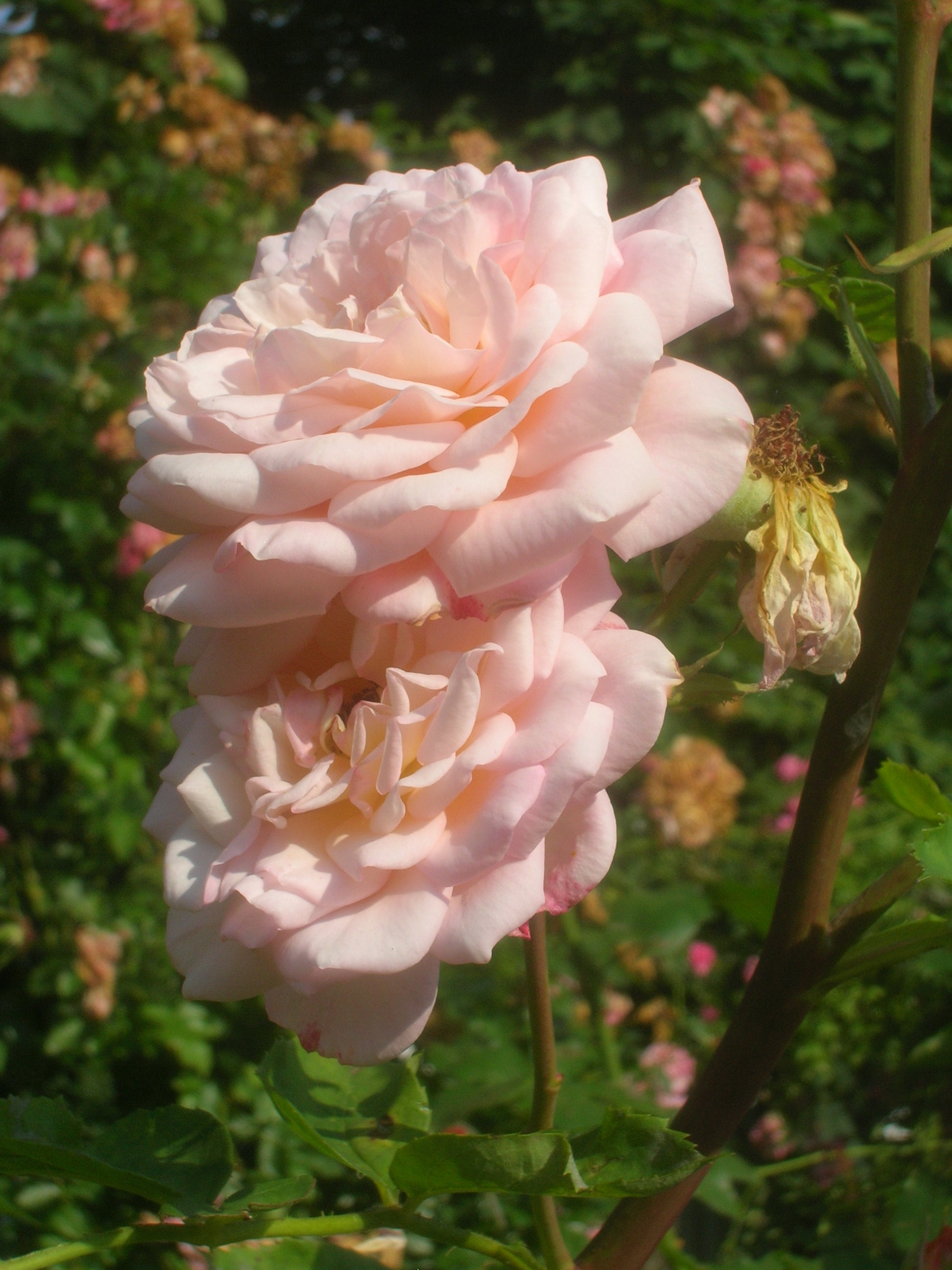
- Genus: Rosa hybrid
- Hybrid parentage: 'Aloha' x 'Yellow Cushion'
- Cultivar group: English rose
- Cultivar: 'Abraham Darby'
- Marketing names: 'AUScot', 'Candy Rain', 'Country Darby tree'
- Origin: David Austin, England, 1985

Abraham Darby (synonyms 'AUScot', Candy Rain, Country Darby tree) is a popular apricot Shrub rose cultivar which was introduced by David Austin in England in 1985. The English rose was bred by crossing the climber 'Aloha' with the floribunda 'Yellow Cushion' and is named after the industrialist Abraham Darby, the constructor of the first iron bridge, which is situated less than 15 km from David Austin's nurseries. The naming happened in collaboration with the Ironbridge Gorge Museum Trust.

'Abraham Darby' is an old-fashioned looking rose with many large, showy flowers with a classic quartered shape in an apricot-pink colour which varies with climate and age. It ranges from soft apricot pink on the inside, pale yellow on the outside in warmer areas to a rich peachy pink with lighter edges in cooler climates. Additionally the colour pales as the flower matures. The cupped flowers have an average diameter of 11 cm (4.3 in) and up to 70 petals. They usually have strong, fruity fragrance, grow in small clusters and appear abundantly throughout the season. As the rather heavy flowers tend to bow their heads, Abraham Darby is suited to be trained as a climber.

The cultivar is winter hardy down to −20 °C (USDA zone 6 – 10b) and generally disease resistant, but can be susceptible to rust. The vigorous plant grows very bushy growing approximately 150 to 300 cm (4.9 to 9.8 ft) high and 90 to 150 cm (3.0 to 4.9 ft) wide. It is almost thornless and has glossy, leathery foliage of a medium to dark green colour. Due to its long arching shoots, it can be grown as a freestanding shrub or trained as a climber, if given some support. The cultivar can be used in flower beds, rose borders, landscaping or as container rose in sunny or partially shaded locations, and is well suited as cut flower.

'Abraham Darby' is used as a parent rose and was used to hybridise the cultivars 'Crown Princess Margareta' (1991), 'Golden Celebration' (1992), 'Jude the Obscure' (1995), 'Pat Austin' (1995) and 'Marianne' (2001).

== Literature ==
- Austin, David (1992) Old Roses and English Roses
