= Rosa 'The King's Rose' =

Rose cultivar

Rosa The King's Rose
- Genus: Rosa
- Cultivar group: Floribunda
- Marketing names: 'Ausa27a16'
- Breeder: David Austin Roses, 2025

Rosa 'The King's Rose' is an English shrub rose cultivar bred by David Austin Roses. The rose was introduced in May 2025 at the Chelsea Flower Show and named in honour of King Charles III, with its creation carried out in collaboration with the King's Foundation. The variety was developed over approximately 12 years and represents the first striped rose in the David Austin collection.

== Description ==
The King's Rose produces semi-double blooms with fuchsia-pink and white stripes, a feature that recalls the character of historic Gallica roses. The flowers open to reveal yellow stamens that attract pollinators, while the rose has a light-to-medium musk fragrance with notes of fresh apple, rosewater, and subtle clove. It forms a robust, medium-sized shrub with a rounded, vase-shaped habit and heart-shaped leaves, reaching around 125 cm (4 ft) in height and 100 cm (3 ft) in width. The cultivar is repeat-flowering, disease resistant, and suitable for a variety of garden settings, including cottage gardens, mixed borders, and container planting.

The inspiration for the rose's name originated from a meeting between rose breeder David J. C. Austin and the then Prince of Wales at the Chelsea Flower Show in the 1990s. When the new striped rose flowered for the first time, Austin considered it a fitting tribute to Charles's long-standing commitment to nature, sustainability, and heritage. The King's Rose was created to support the King's Foundation, with proceeds from sales contributing to the organisation's work in education, sustainable practices, and the preservation of heritage. David Austin Roses donated £2.50 from each sale of the rose to the King's Foundation as part of the collaboration. The rose has been planted at several locations associated with the King, including Highgrove Gardens, Dumfries House, and the Castle of Mey.
