= Michael Marriott =

Michael Marriott may refer to:

- Michael Marriott (economist) (1926–1975), British public figure and economist
- Michael Marriott (rosarian) (fl. 1970s–2020s), British rosarian
