= Rosa 'Lichfield Angel' =

White blend shrub rose

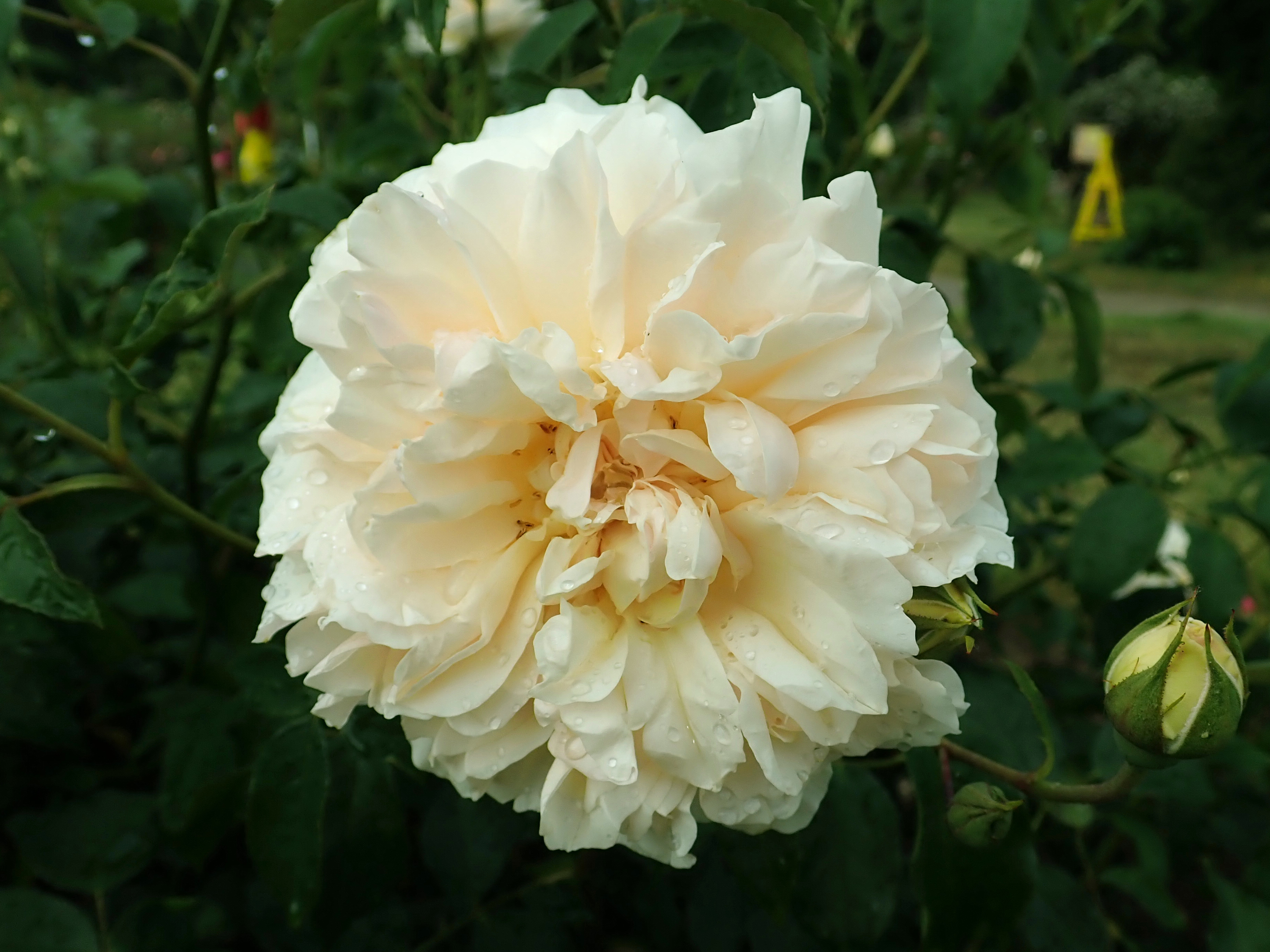
- Genus: Rosa hybrid
- Cultivar group: Shrub rose
- Cultivar: 'AUSrelate'
- Breeder: David C. H. Austin
- Origin: Great Britain, 2006

Rosa 'Lichfield Angel (a.k.a. AUSrelate) is a white blend shrub rose, bred by British rose breeder, David C. H. Austin before 2005. It was introduced into the UK by David Austin Roses Limited (UK) in 2006. The rose is part of the David Austin English Rose Collection. It was awarded the Royal Horticultural Society's Award of Garden Merit in 2012.

== Description ==
'Lichfield Angel' is a medium-sized, vigorous bushy shrub rose, 3 to 4 ft (0.91–1.22 m) in height, with a 2 to 3 ft (0.61–0.91 m) spread. It has large flowers with an average 4 to 5 in (100–130 mm) in diameter, with up to 110 petals on each bloom. Light pink-peach buds open to a large domed, rosette-shaped bloom form. The flowers are cream in colour or varying shades of white and have a moderate, clove fragrance. 'Lichfield Angel' blooms repeatedly throughout the season. The plant is nearly thornless and has medium, semi-glossy, dark green foliage.

== History ==
=== David Austin roses ===
David C. H. Austin (1926 – 2018) was an award-winning rose breeder, nursery owner and writer from Shropshire, England. He began breeding roses in the 1950s with the goal of creating new shrub rose varieties that would possess the best qualities of old-fashioned roses while incorporating the long flowering characteristics of hybrid tea roses and floribundas. His first commercially successful rose cultivar was 'Constance Spry', which he introduced in 1961. He created a new, informal class of roses in the 1960s, which he named "English Roses". Austin's roses are generally known today as "David Austin Roses". Austin attained international commercial success with his new rose varieties. Some of his most popular roses include 'Wife of Bath' (1969), 'Graham Thomas' (1983), and 'Abraham Darby' (1985)

=== 'Lichfield Angel' ===
'Lichfield Angel' was bred by Austin before 2005 and introduced in the UK by David Austin Roses Limited (UK) in 2006. The cultivar was developed from a cross between two unnamed, unpatented parents. 'Lichfield Angel' is part of the David Austin English Rose Collection. It was awarded the Royal Horticultural Society's Award of Garden Merit in 2012. 'Lichfield Angel' was named after the Lichfield Angel, an eighth century limestone sculptured panel of the Archangel Gabriel, discovered in 2003 in Lichfield Cathedral in the UK.

== Sources ==
- Phillips, Roger; Rix, Martin (2004). The Ultimate Guide toRoses. Pan Macmillan. ISBN 978-1405049207.
- Quest-Ritson, Brigid; Quest-Ritson, Charles (2003). Encyclopedia of Roses. DK Publishing. ISBN 978-0756688684.
- Wilcox, Peter (2011). The Gold, the Angel and the Gospel Book. Lichfield Cathedral. ISBN 978-0-9558887-7-9.
