= Rosa 'Princess Anne' =

Deep pink shrub rose cultivar

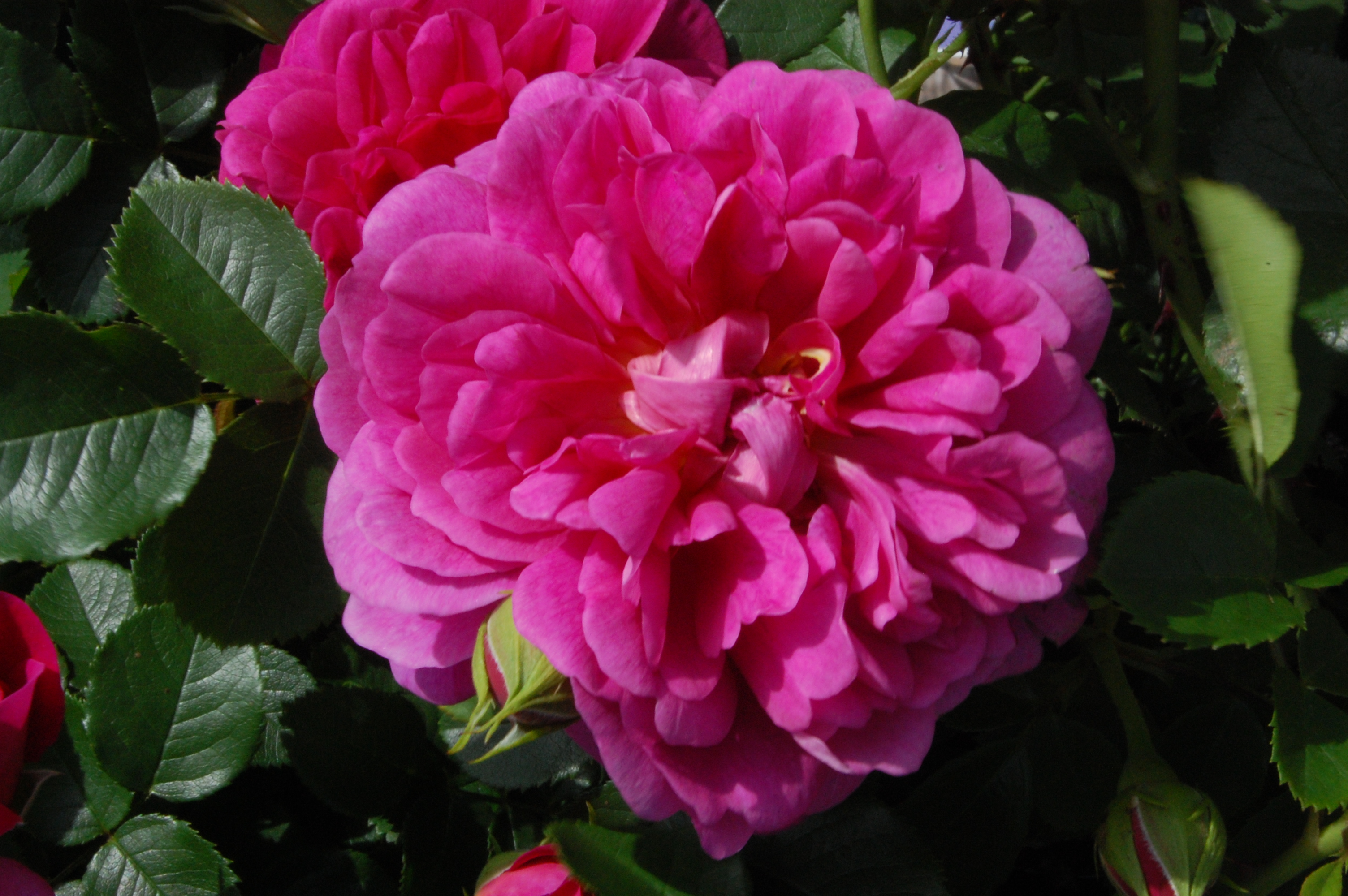
- Rosa 'Princess Anne'
- Genus: Rosa hybrid
- Hybrid parentage: 'Unnamed seedlings'
- Cultivar group: Shrub rose
- Cultivar: 'AUSkitchen'
- Breeder: David C. H. Austin
- Origin: Great Britain, 2010

Rosa 'Princess Anne' (a.k.a. AUSkitchen) is a deep pink shrub rose, bred by British rose breeder, David C. H. Austin before 2009. It was introduced into the United Kingdom by David Austin Roses Limited (UK) in 2010. The rose is named after Anne, Princess Royal.

== Description ==
'Princess Anne' is a bushy compact shrub rose, up to 3 ft (0.91 m) in height, with a 28 in (710 mm) spread. This rose makes an excellent short climbing rose. It has narrow, large flowers with a rosette-shaped bloom form. Flowers are borne in large clusters (85+) of petals. Buds open to dark pink roses that soon fade to a bright pink. The undersides are pink with undertones of yellow. 'Princess Anne' can have a mild to strong tea fragrance and has glossy green foliage. It is very disease resistant and blooms in flushes from late spring to fall.

== History ==
=== David Austin roses ===
David C. H. Austin (1926 – 2018) was an award-winning rose breeder, nursery owner and writer from Shropshire, England. He began breeding roses in the 1950s with the goal of creating new shrub rose varieties that would possess the best qualities of old-fashioned roses while incorporating the long flowering characteristics of hybrid tea roses and floribundas. His first commercially successful rose cultivar was 'Constance Spry', which he introduced in 1961. He created a new, informal class of roses in the 1960s, which he named "English Roses". Austin's roses are generally known today as "David Austin Roses". Austin attained international commercial success with his new rose varieties. Some of his most popular roses include 'Wife of Bath' (1969), 'Graham Thomas' (1983), and 'Abraham Darby' (1985)

=== 'Princess Anne' ===
'Princess Anne' was bred by Austin before 2009. The cultivar was developed from a cross between two unnamed, unpatented parents. It was named in honor of Anne, Princess Royal. It was introduced into the United Kingdom by David Austin Roses Limited (UK) in 2010.
