= Rosa 'Claire Austin' =

White blend shrub rose cultivar

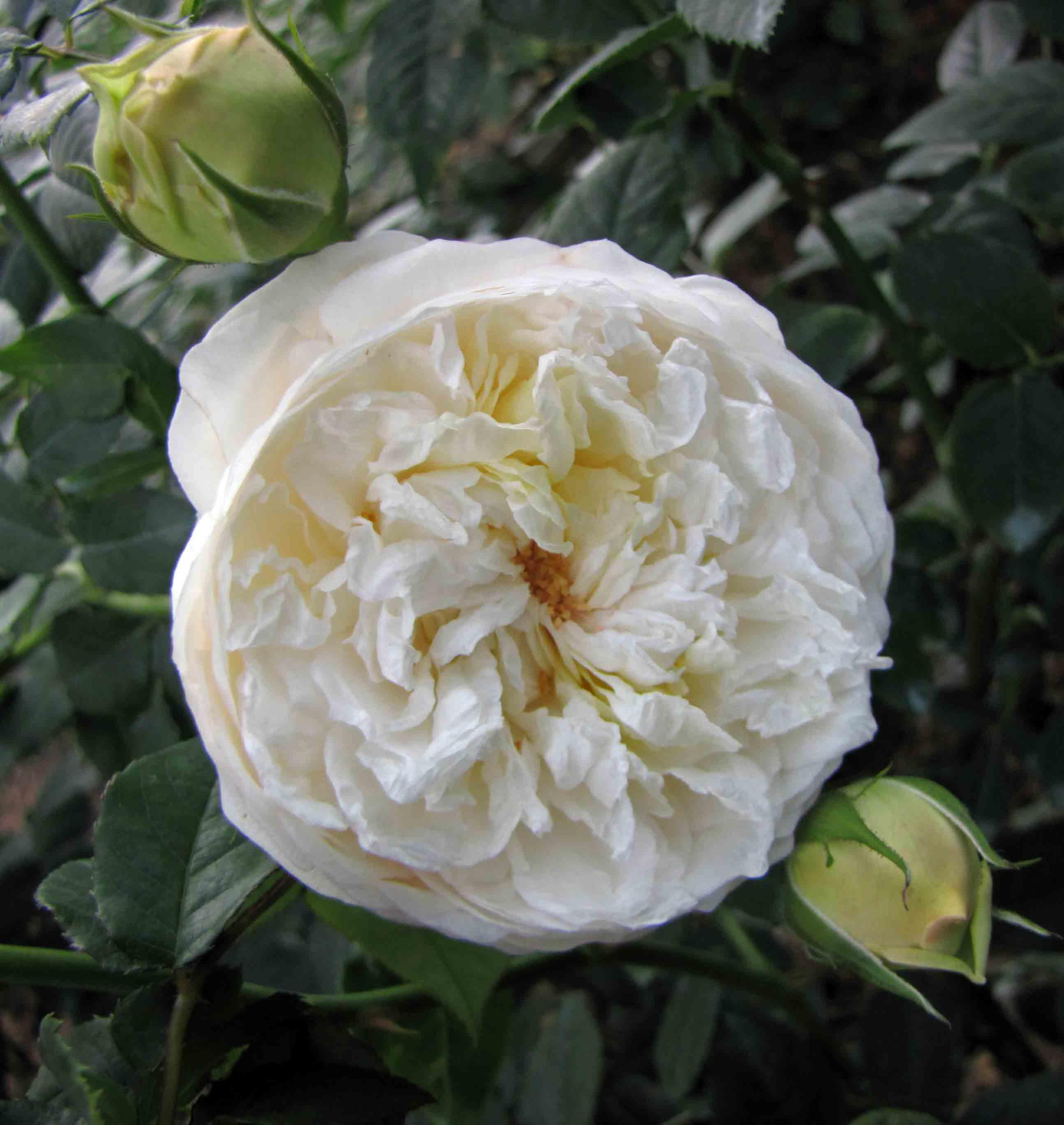
- Rosa 'Claire Austin'
- Genus: Rosa hybrid
- Cultivar group: Shrub rose
- Cultivar: 'AUSprior'
- Breeder: David C. H. Austin
- Origin: Great Britain, 2007

Rosa 'Claire Austin' (a.k.a. AUSprior) is a white blend climbing rose, bred by British rose breeder, David C. H. Austin before 2007. It was introduced into the United Kingdom by David Austin Roses Limited (UK) in 2007.

== Description ==
'Claire Austin' is a vigorous upright shrub rose, up to 144 in (3,700 mm) in height, with a 2 to 3 ft (0.61–0.91 m) spread. This rose makes an excellent short climbing rose. It has medium size full globular flowers with a cupped bloom form. Flowers are borne mostly solitary or in small clusters. Pale lemon buds open to creamy white flowers. The rose has a strong myrrh and vanilla fragrance and has matt green foliage and red prickles. The shrub blooms in flushes throughout the season. Blooms tend to ball up in rainy weather.

== History ==
=== David Austin roses ===
David C. H. Austin (1926 – 2018) was an award-winning rose breeder, nursery owner and writer from Shropshire, England. He began breeding roses in the 1950s with the goal of creating new shrub rose varieties that would possess the best qualities of old-fashioned roses while incorporating the long flowering characteristics of hybrid tea roses and floribundas. His first commercially successful rose cultivar was 'Constance Spry', which he introduced in 1961. He created a new, informal class of roses in the 1960s, which he named "English Roses". Austin's roses are generally known today as "David Austin Roses". Austin attained international commercial success with his new rose varieties. Some of his most popular roses include 'Wife of Bath' (1969), 'Canterbury' (1969), and 'Abraham Darby' (1985)

=== 'Claire Austin' ===
This rose was bred by Austin before 2007 and named for his daughter, Claire. She owns a nursery specializing in irises, peonies and daylillies. The lineage of the 'Claire Austin' is unknown.
