= Rosa 'Yellow Button' =

Yellow blend shrub rose cultivar

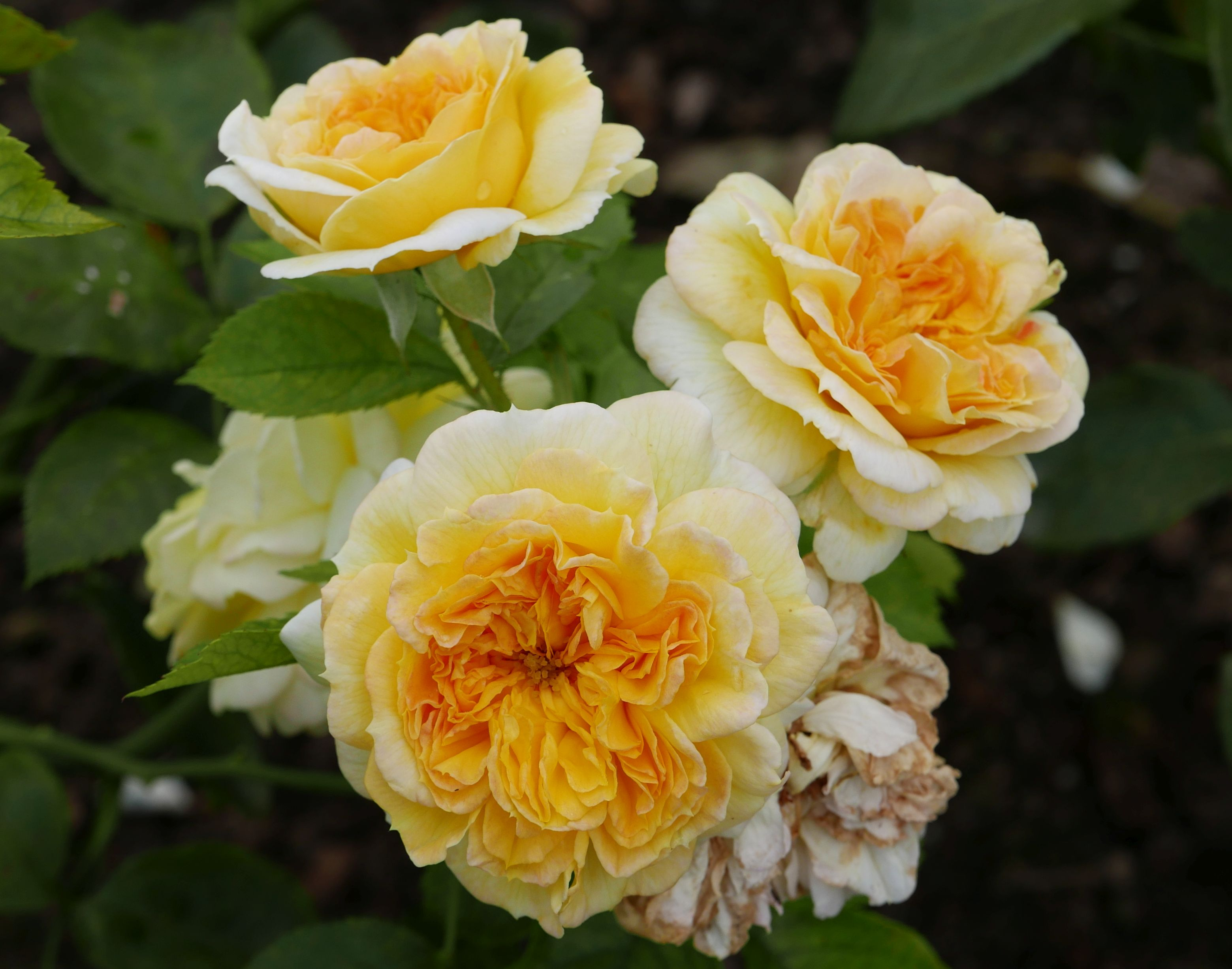
- Rosa 'Yellow Button'
- Genus: Rosa hybrid
- Hybrid parentage: 'Wife of Bath' x 'Chinatown
- Cultivar group: Shrub rose
- Cultivar: 'AUSlow'
- Breeder: David C. H. Austin
- Origin: Great Britain, 1975

Rosa 'Yellow Button' (aka AUSlow) is a yellow blend shrub rose, bred by British rose breeder, David C. H. Austin in 1975. It was the first yellow rose of Austin's English Rose Collection.

== Description ==
'Yellow Button' is a bushy shrub rose, 3 to 4 ft (0.91–1.22 m) in height, with a 2 to 3 ft (0.61–0.91 m) spread. It has very full (40+) pom-pom shaped petals, born in clusters of 3–9. Buds open to flowers that are a bright yellow and fades quickly to white, beginning at the edges. This creates a pretty contrast between the bright yellow center and the pale outer petals. The rose has a mild, fruity, often musky fragrance and has dark green foliage and red prickles. The shrub occasionally blooms later in the summer. 'Yellow Button' is not a hardy shrub, and requires regular attention to keep it healthy. It thrives best in cool climates.

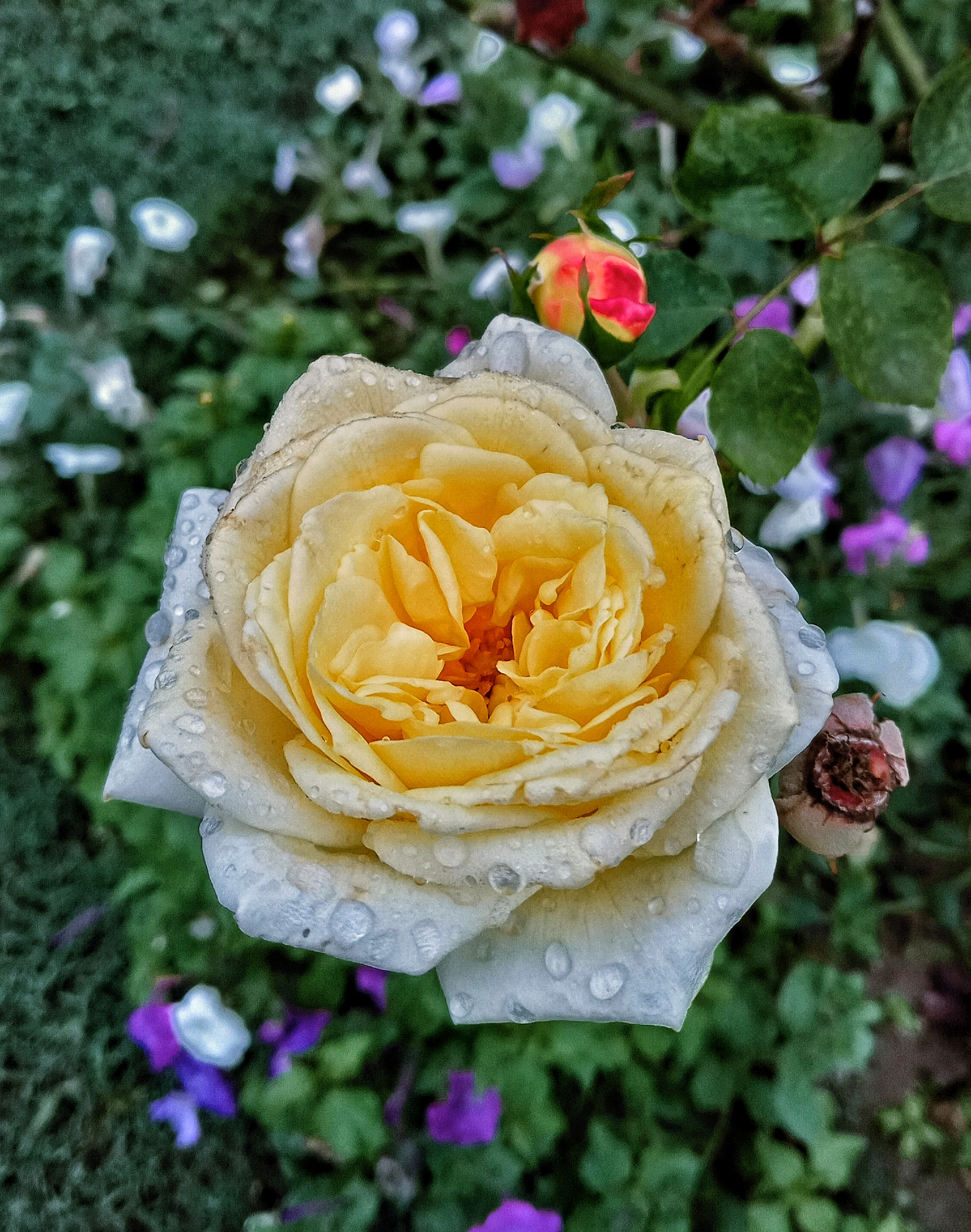
Rosa 'Yellow Button'

== History ==
=== David Austin roses ===
David C. H. Austin (1926 – 2018) was an award-winning rose breeder, nursery owner and writer from Shropshire, England. He began breeding roses in the 1950s with the goal of creating new shrub rose varieties that would possess the best qualities of old-fashioned roses while incorporating the long flowering characteristics of hybrid tea roses and floribundas. His first commercially successful rose cultivar was 'Constance Spry', which he introduced in 1961. He created a new, informal class of roses in the 1960s, which he named "English Roses". Austin's roses are generally known today as "David Austin Roses". Austin attained international commercial success with his new rose varieties. Some of his most popular roses include 'Wife of Bath' (1969), 'Canterbury' (1969), and 'Abraham Darby' (1985)

=== 'Yellow Button' ===
Austin developed 'Yellow Button' using stock parents, 'Wife of Bath' and 'Chinatown' in 1975. It was the first of Austin's English Roses in yellow. This rose was used to hybridize one child plant, 'The Pilgrim' (Austin, 1991)

== Sources ==
- Quest-Ritson, Brigid; Quest-Ritson, Charles (1993). Encyclopedia of Roses. DK Publishing. ISBN 978-0756688684.
- Phillips, Roger; Rix, Martyn (1993). The Quest for the Rose. New York: Random House. ISBN 978-0-679-43573-0.
