= Rosa 'Queen of Sweden' =

Pink shrub rose cultivar

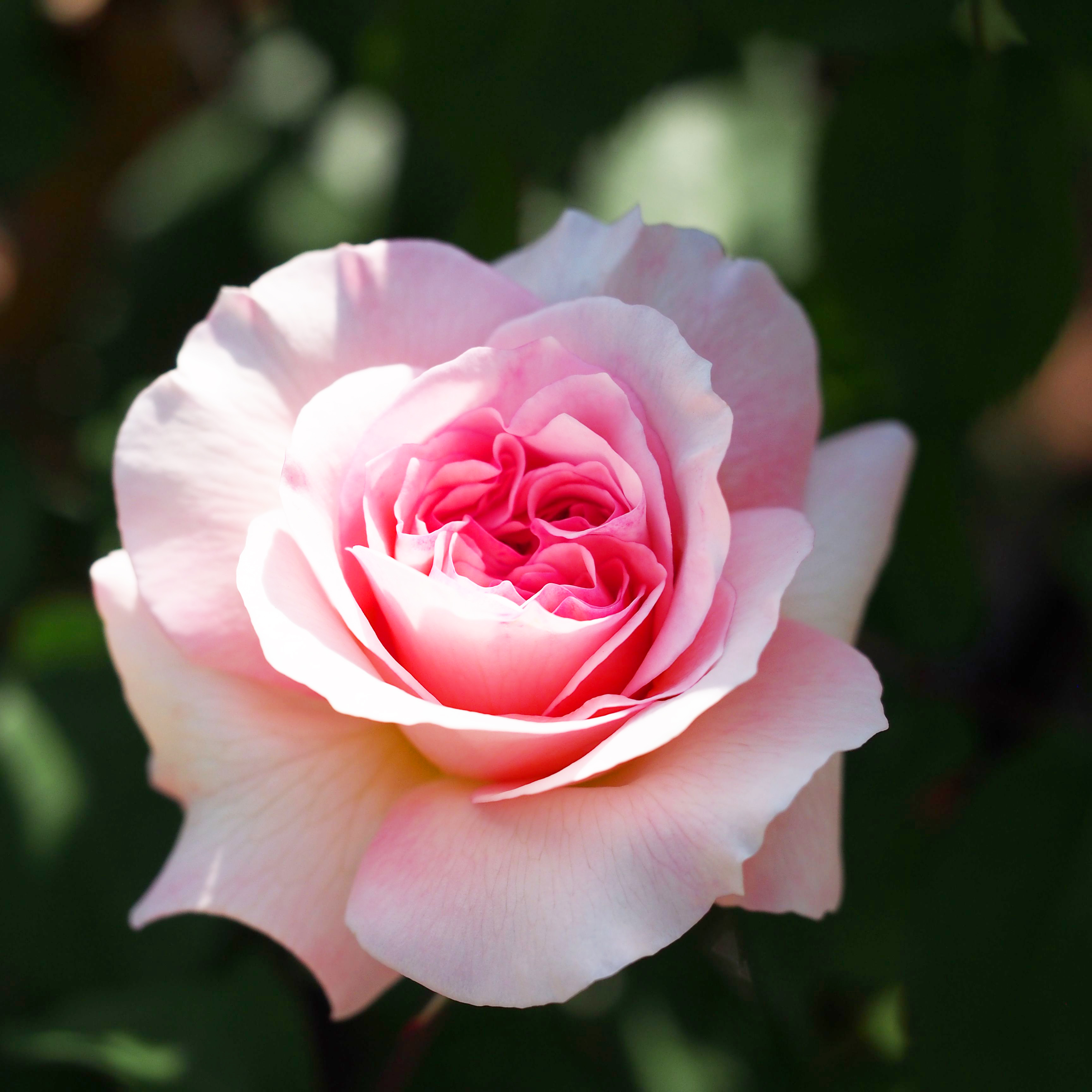
- Rosa 'Queen of Sweden'
- Genus: Rosa hybrid
- Hybrid parentage: 'Unnamed seedling x 'Charlotte'
- Cultivar group: Shrub rose
- Cultivar: 'AUStiger'
- Breeder: David C. H. Austin
- Origin: Great Britain, 2004

Rosa 'Queen of Sweden' (aka AUStiger) is a pink shrub rose cultivar, bred by British rose breeder, David C. H. Austin, and introduced into the UK by David Austin Roses Limited (UK) in 2004. The rose is part of the David Austin English Rose Collection.

== Description ==
'Queen of Sweden' is a medium bushy shrub rose, 3 to 5 ft (0.91–1.52 m) in height, with a 2 to 3 ft (0.61–0.91 m) spread.It has a mild fragrance of myrrh. The flowers are medium-sized, 2.75 in (70 mm) and very full (40+ petals), shallow cupped bloom form. The color begins as a blend of apricot and pink, turning to light pink as the flower ages. The rose blooms in flushes throughout the season. Foliage is matte and medium green.

== History ==
=== David Austin roses ===
David C. H. Austin (1926 – 2018) was an award-winning rose breeder, nursery owner and writer from Shropshire, England. He began breeding roses in the 1950s with the goal of creating new shrub rose varieties that would possess the best qualities of old-fashioned roses while incorporating the long flowering characteristics of hybrid tea roses and floribundas. His first commercially successful rose cultivar was 'Constance Spry', which he introduced in 1961. He created a new, informal class of roses in the 1960s, which he named "English Roses". Austin's roses are generally known today as "David Austin Roses". Austin attained international commercial success with his new rose varieties. Some of his most popular roses include 'Wife of Bath' (1969), 'Canterbury' (1969), and 'Abraham Darby' (1985)

=== 'Queen of Sweden' ===
Austin developed 'Queen of Sweden' by crossing an 'Unnamed seedling' with the yellow shrub rose, 'Charlotte'. The new cultivar was introduced into the UK by David Austin Roses Limited (UK) in 2004. The rose is part of the David Austin English Rose Collection.

== Sources ==
- Quest-Ritson, Brigid; Quest-Ritson, Charles (2003). Encyclopedia of Roses. DK Publishing. ISBN 978-0756688684.
- Phillips, Roger; Rix, Martyn (1993). The Quest for the Rose. New York: Random House. ISBN 978-0-679-43573-0.
