= Rosa 'Jude the Obscure' =

Pale apricot shrub rose

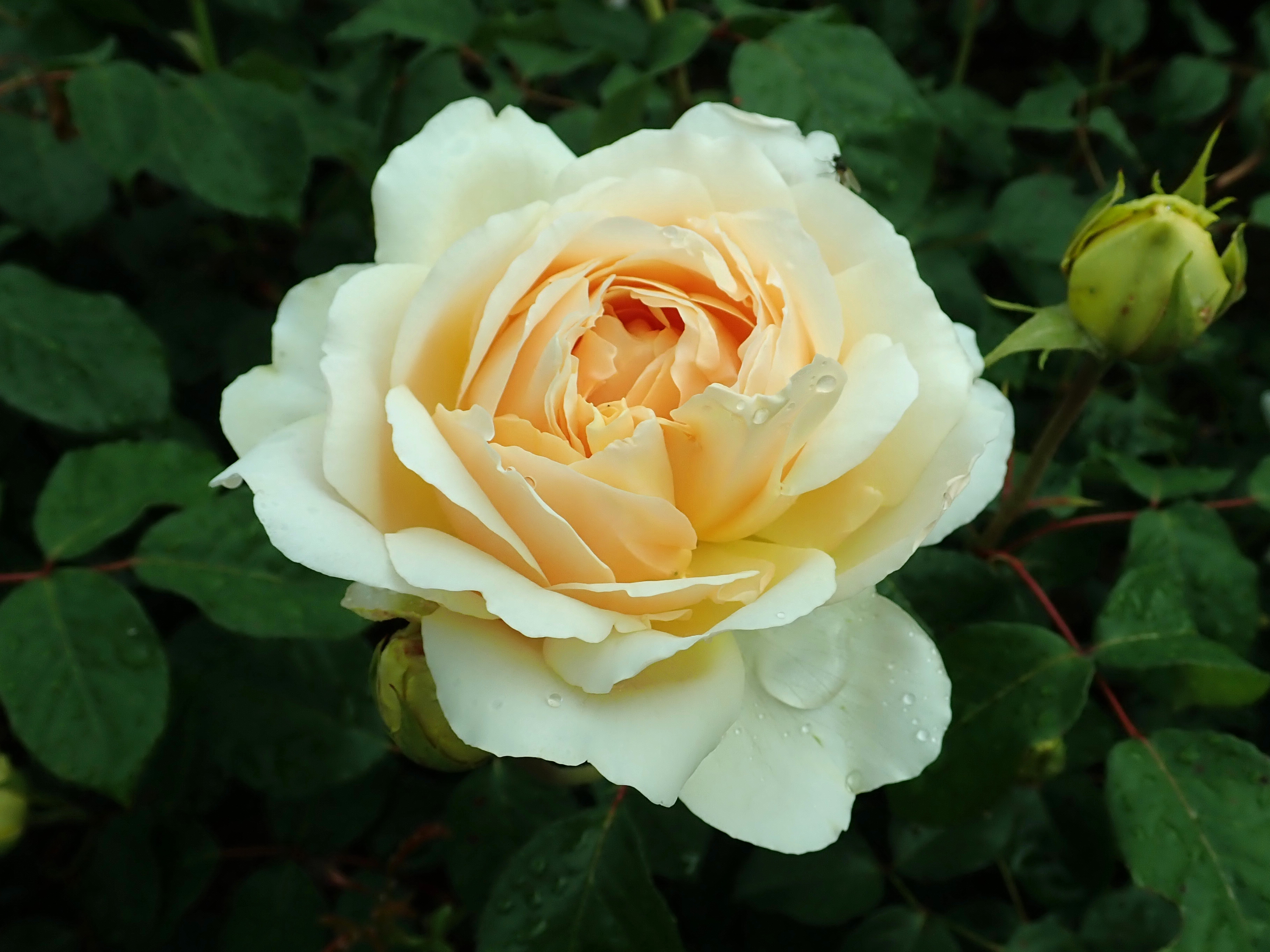
- Genus: Rosa hybrid
- Hybrid parentage: 'Abraham Darby' x 'Windrush'
- Cultivar group: Shrub rose
- Cultivar: 'AUSjo'
- Breeder: David C. H. Austin
- Origin: Great Britain, 1995

Rosa 'Jude the Obscure (a.k.a. AUSjo) is a pale apricot shrub rose, bred by British rose breeder, David C. H. Austin in 1989. It was introduced into the UK by David Austin Roses Limited (UK) in 1995. The rose is named after the 19th century novel, Jude the Obscure, by the British writer, Thomas Hardy.

== Description ==
'Jude the Obscure' is a medium-sized, bushy shrub rose, up to 4 ft (1.2 m) in height, with a 4 ft (1.2 m) spread. It has large flowers with an average 4 to 5 in (100–130 mm) in diameter. Ovoid, apricot buds open to a fully double, cupped bloom form that appear ruffled when they are fully open. The flowers are pale apricot with a cream center and pale, almost white outer petals. The rose has a strong, fruity fragrance. 'Jude the Obscure' blooms in flushes throughout the season. The plant is prickly with lax stems and has medium, semi-glossy, dark green foliage. It is very disease resistant.

== History ==
David C. H. Austin (1926 – 2018) began breeding roses in the 1950s, with the goal of creating new shrub rose varieties that would possess the best qualities of old-fashioned roses while incorporating the long flowering characteristics of hybrid tea roses and floribundas. He created a new, informal class of roses in the 1960s, which he named "English Roses". )

'Jude the Obscure' was bred by Austin 1989 and introduced in the UK by David Austin Roses Limited (UK) in 1995. The cultivar was developed from a cross between the two shrub roses, 'Abraham Darby' x 'Windrush'. The rose variety is named after the 19th century novel, Jude the Obscure, by the British writer, Thomas Hardy.

== Sources ==
- Phillips, Roger; Rix, Martin (2004). The Ultimate Guide to Roses. Pan Macmillan. ISBN 978-1405049207.
- Quest-Ritson, Brigid; Quest-Ritson, Charles (2003). Encyclopedia of Roses. DK Publishing. ISBN 978-0756688684.
