= Rosa 'Heritage' =

Light pink shrub rose cultivar

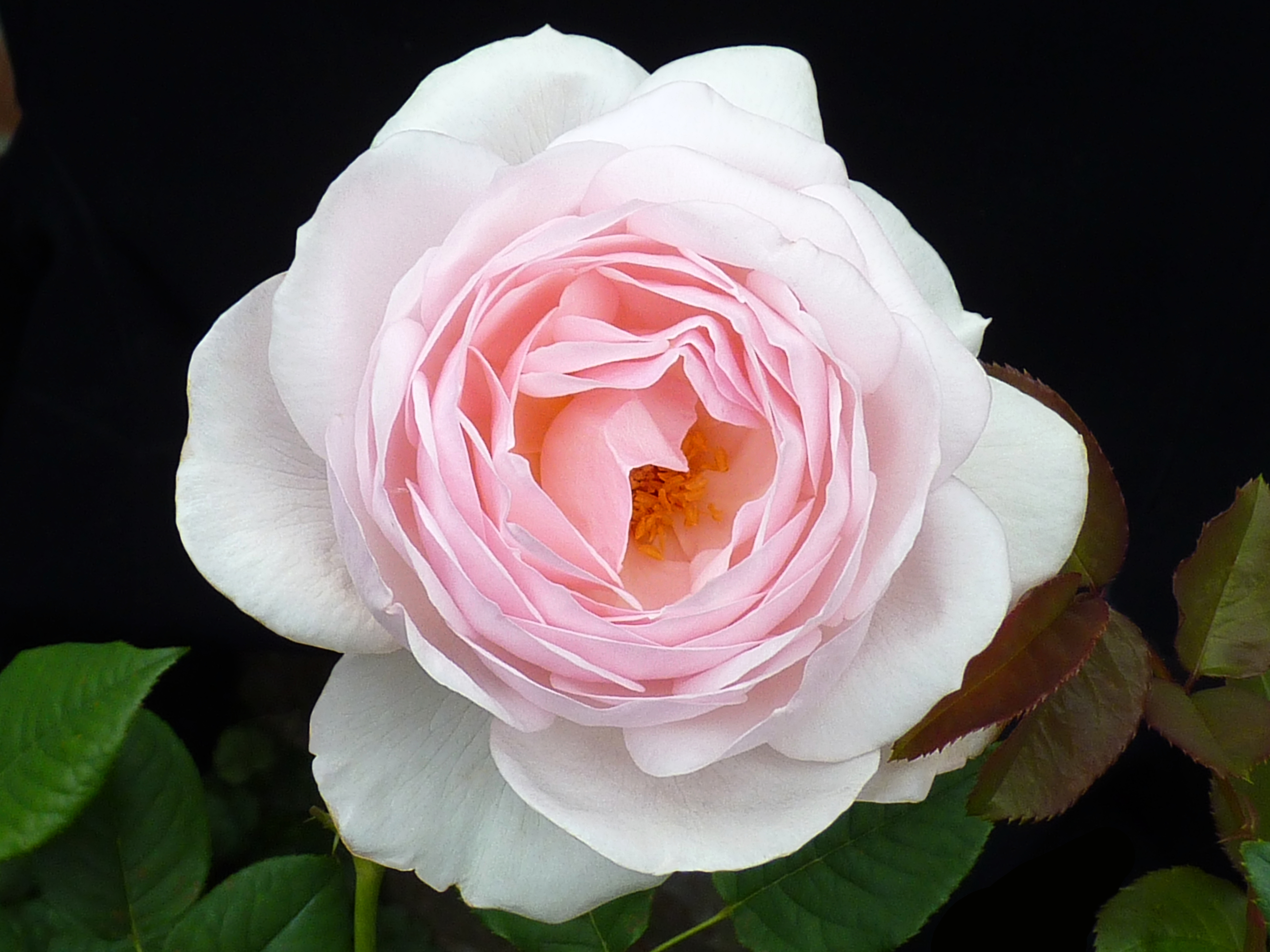
- Rosa 'Heritage'
- Genus: Rosa hybrid
- Hybrid parentage: 'Unnamed Seedling' × ('Iceberg' × 'Wife of Bath')
- Cultivar group: Shrub rose
- Cultivar: 'AUSblush', 'English Heritage', 'Roberta'
- Breeder: David C. H. Austin
- Origin: Great Britain, 1984

Rosa 'Heritage' (aka AUSblush) is a pink shrub rose cultivar, bred by British rose breeder, David C. H. Austin and introduced into the UK by David Austin Roses Limited (UK) in 1984. The rose is one of the most popular roses of the David Austin English Rose Collection.

== Description ==
'Heritage' is a bushy, upright shrub rose, 4 to 5 ft (1.2–1.5 m) in height, with a 2 to 4 ft (0.61–1.22 m) spread. It has a full (26 to 40 petals), cupped, rosette bloom form and a strong, fruity fragrance. The flowers are large, 4 to 5 in (100–130 mm), and are soft pink in colour with a lighter pink or white at the edges. They are borne in small clusters of 3–7. The plant has long, lax stems and the flowers fall apart easily; 'Heritage' does not make a good cut flower. It is an excellent repeat bloomer and will flower repeatedly until early winter. Leaves are large, dark green and glossy. The plant does best in cool climates and is nearly thornless.

== History ==
=== David Austin roses ===
David C. H. Austin (1926 – 2018) was an award-winning rose breeder, nursery owner and writer from Shropshire, England. He began breeding roses in the 1950s with the goal of creating new shrub rose varieties that would possess the best qualities of old-fashioned roses while incorporating the long flowering characteristics of hybrid tea roses and floribundas. His first commercially successful rose cultivar was 'Constance Spry', which he introduced in 1961. He created a new, informal class of roses in the 1960s, which he named "English Roses". Austin's roses are generally known today as "David Austin Roses". Austin attained international commercial success with his new rose varieties. Some of his most popular roses include 'Wife of Bath' (1969), 'Canterbury' (1969), and 'Abraham Darby' (1985)

=== 'Heritage' ===
Austin developed 'Heritage' using an 'Unnamed Seedling' x ('Iceberg' x ('Wife of Bath'). It was introduced into the UK by David Austin Roses Limited (UK) in 1984. The rose is part of the David Austin English Rose Collection and is one of Austin's most popular English roses.

== Sources ==
- Quest-Ritson, Brigid; Quest-Ritson, Charles (2003). Encyclopedia of Roses. DK Publishing. ISBN 978-0756688684.
- Phillips, Roger; Rix, Martyn (1993). The Quest for the Rose. New York: Random House. ISBN 978-0-679-43573-0.
