= David C. H. Austin =

British rose breeder and writer (1926–2018)

David C.H. Austin Sr. OBE VMH
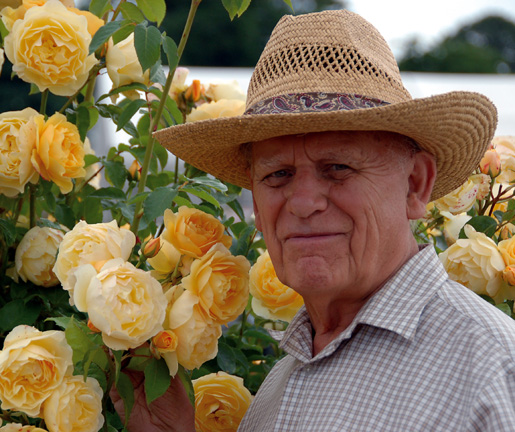
- Born: 16 February 1926; Albrighton, Shropshire, England
- Died: 18 December 2018 (aged 92); Shropshire, England
- Spouse: Pat Austin

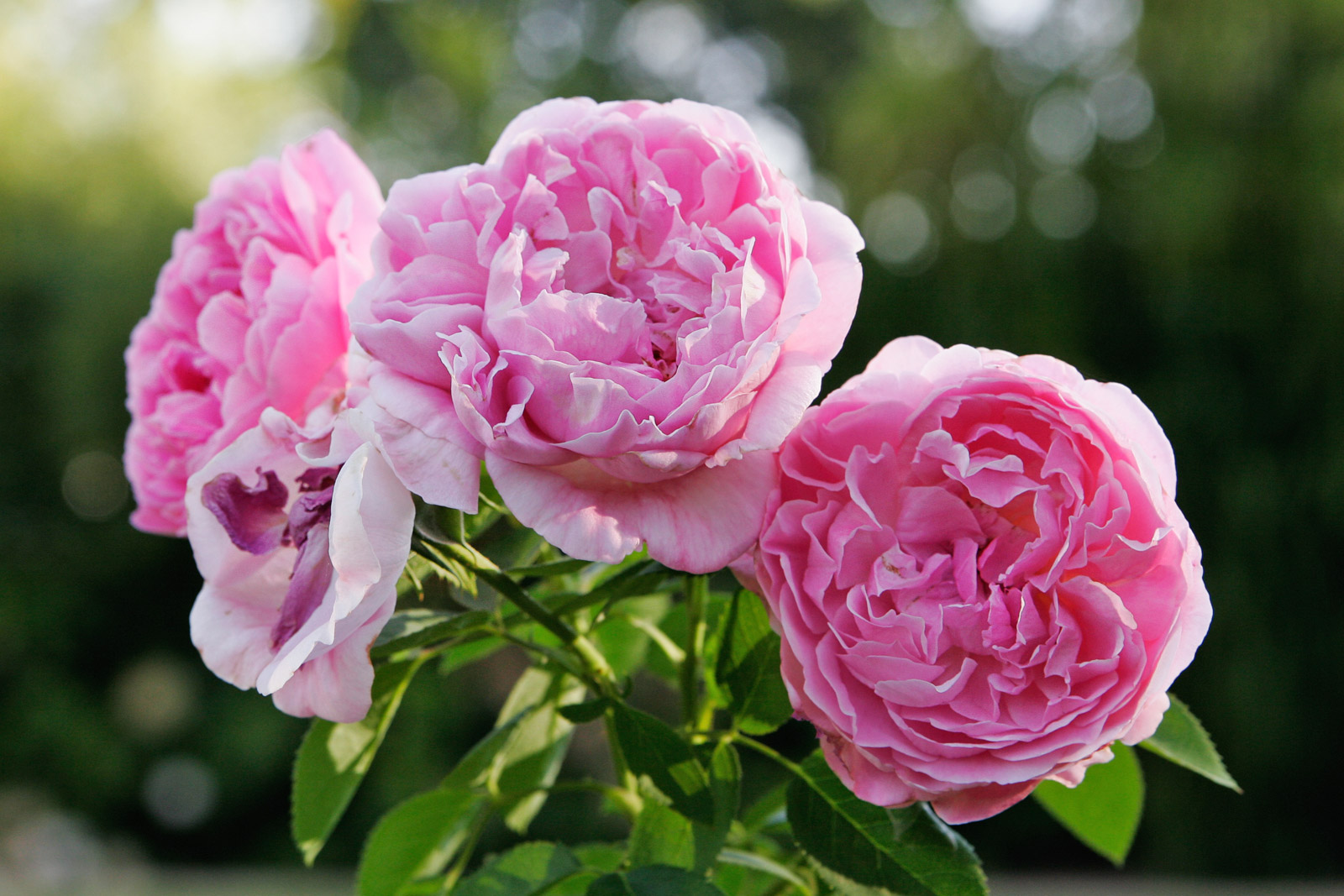
David Austin English Rose 'Mary Rose' 1983 (named after the ship Mary Rose) in the Albury, New South Wales, Botanical Gardens

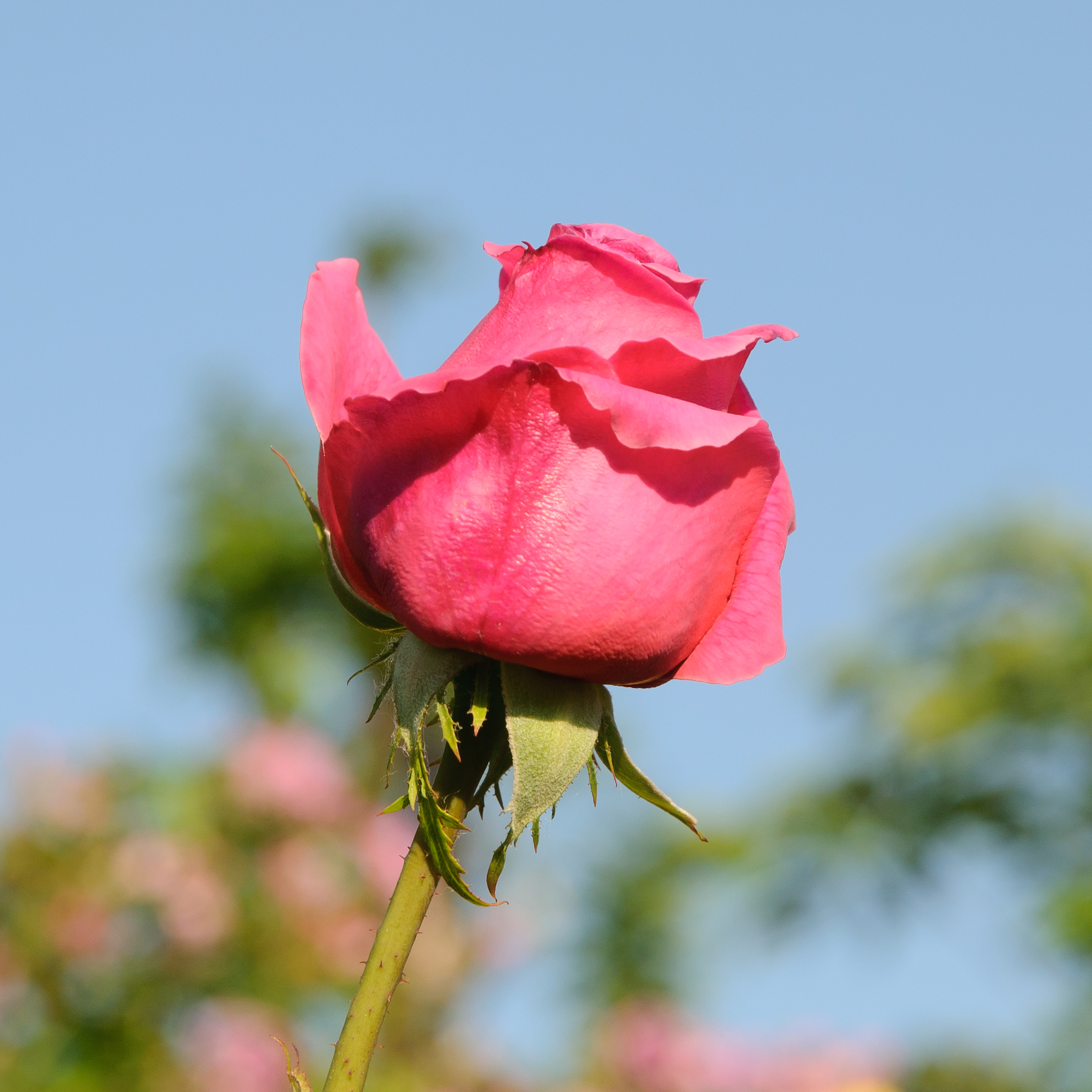
Rosa 'Othello' (named after the tragedy Othello) in the Volksgarten

David Charles Henshaw Austin Sr. OBE VMH (16 February 1926 – 18 December 2018) was a British rose breeder and writer who lived in Shropshire, England. His emphasis was on breeding roses with the character and fragrance of old garden roses (such as gallicas, damasks and alba roses) but with the repeat-flowering ability and wide colour range of modern roses such as hybrid teas and floribundas.

== Career ==
Austin's first commercially available rose, Rosa 'Constance Spry', was introduced in 1961. In 1967 and 1968 he introduced 'Chianti' and 'Shropshire Lass' respectively. Although these first roses bloomed only once in spring or early summer, they led, in 1969, to a series of remontant (repeat-flowering) varieties, including 'Wife of Bath' and 'Canterbury' (both in honour of the English author Geoffrey Chaucer). Austin's roses soon became the most successful group of new roses in the 20th century.

Though Austin's roses are not officially recognised as a separate class of roses by, for instance, the Royal National Rose Society or the American Rose Society, they are nonetheless commonly referred to by rosarians, at nurseries, and in horticultural literature as 'English Roses' (the term he used) or 'Austin Roses'.

Since its founding in 1969, he and his firm David Austin Roses in Albrighton, near Wolverhampton, introduced over 190 rose cultivars during his lifetime. Cultivars have been named in honour of his family, well-known rosarians, geographical landmarks in Britain, historical events, and British writers, particularly Shakespeare and Chaucer, and their works or characters. For instance, roses have honoured such diverse entities as the rosarian and artist Graham Thomas and King Henry VIII's flagship, the Mary Rose. David Austin Roses is still a family business, run by his son David J.C. Austin (1958–2026; joined the business in 1990) and his grandson Richard. For decades Austin worked closely with senior rosarian Michael Marriott.

In the 21st century, Austin separated his roses into four groups as a guide to further developments. The four groups are:

- The Old Rose Hybrids, roses with the appearance of the Old Roses but recurrent, healthy and with a wide range of colours
- The Leander Group, often with Rosa wichurana in their breeding, with larger bushes and arching growth tending to make them pillar or low climbing roses
- The English Musk Roses, based on 'Iceberg' and the Noisette roses, with pale green, slender and airy growth. The musk rose scent is missing from most, though other scents are present in many.
- The English Alba Hybrids, with tall, rather blue-leaved bushes like the old Alba roses.

In 2003, David Austin Sr. was awarded the Victoria Medal of Honour by the Royal Horticultural Society for his services to horticulture and the Dean Hole Medal from the Royal National Rose Society. He received an Honorary MSc from the University of East London for his work on rose breeding. He received the lifetime achievement award from the Garden Centre Association in 2004 and was appointed an Officer of the Order of the British Empire (OBE) in the 2007 Birthday Honours for services to horticulture.

In 2010, he was named a "Great Rosarian of the World".

He died in December 2018 aged 92, and was buried at the parish church of St Mary Magdalene, Albrighton, on 4 January 2019.

== Chelsea Flower Show ==
In 2019, David Austin Roses won its 25th Gold Medal at the Chelsea Flower Show, the first since the death of David Austin in 2018 and the 37th time David Austin Roses had exhibited. The Secret Garden-themed gold medal display housed two new roses – Rosa 'Eustacia Vye' and Rosa 'Gabriel Oak' – named after characters in the work of Thomas Hardy.

== Books ==
- Austin, David (1990). The heritage of the rose (rev. ed., repr. ed.). Woodbridge: Antique Collector's Club. ISBN 1851490205.
- Austin, David (1992). Old roses and English roses (repr. ed.). Woodbridge: Antique Collector's Club. ISBN 1851491503.
- Austin, David (1993). Shrub roses and climbing roses : with hybrid tea and floribunda roses (repr. ed.). Woodbridge: Antique Collectors' Club. ISBN 185149166X.
- Martin, Clair G. (1997). 100 English roses for the American garden. New York: Workman. ISBN 0761101853.
- Austin, David (2010). David Austin's English roses. Woodbridge: Garden Art. ISBN 978-1870673709.
- Lawson, Andrew; David Austin (2011). The English roses (rev. ed.). London: Conran Octopus. ISBN 978-1840915549.
- David Austin wrote the foreword for Beales, Peter (1998). Botanica's roses : encyclopedia of roses. Random House. ISBN 0091835925.
- His annual free catalogue David Austin Handbook of Roses, mainly devoted to Austin Roses but also listing many other varieties (often in the Austin roses pedigree) on sale, contains information on roses and their care in general, as well as many rose photographs.

== "English Rose" ==
"English Rose" is the designation for roses bred by David Austin.

=== List of Austin cultivars ===
- 'Constance Spry' (1961)
- 'Chianti' (1967)
- 'Shropshire Lass' (1968)
- 'Canterbury' (1969)
- 'The Friar' (1969)
- 'The Prioress' (1969)
- 'The Yeoman' (1969)
- 'The Knight' (1969)
- 'Chaucer' (1970)
- 'Charles Austin' (1973)
- 'Lilian Austin (1973)
- 'Redcoat' (1973)
- 'Yellow Button' (1975)
- 'The Squire' (1976)
- 'The Countryman' (1979)
- 'Charmian' (1982)
- 'Leander' (1982)
- 'Hero' (1982)
- 'Wise Portia' (1982)
- 'Cressida' (1983)
- 'Dapple Dawn' (1983)
- 'Graham Thomas' (1983)
- 'Immortal Juno' (1983)
- 'Lucetta' (1983)
- 'Mary Rose' (1983)
- 'Moonbeam' (1983)
- 'Perdita' (1983)
- 'Belle Story' (1984)
- 'Troilus' (1983)
- 'Tamora' (1983)
- 'Bredon' (1984)
- 'Dove' (1984)
- 'Heritage' (1984)
- 'Mary Webb' (1984)
- 'Windrush' (1984)
- 'Wenlock' (1984)
- 'Abraham Darby' (1985)
- 'Ellen' (1985)
- 'Robbie Burns' (1985)
- 'Sir Walter Raleigh' (1985)
- 'Gertrude Jekyll' (1986)
- 'Symphony' (1986)
- 'Wild Flower' (1986)
- 'The Countryman' (1987)
- 'The Dark Lady' (1987)
- 'The Nun' (1987)
- 'William Shakespeare' (1987)
- 'Charles Rennie Mackintosh' (1988)
- 'Fisherman's Friend' (1988)
- 'Francine Austin' (1988)
- 'L D Braithwaite' (1988)
- 'Potter and Moore' (1988)
- 'Queen Nefertiti' (1988)
- 'Financial Times Centenary' (1989)
- 'Sharifa Asma' (1989)
- 'Snowdon' (1989)
- 'Ambridge Rose' (1990)
- 'Claire Rose' (1990)
- 'Jayne Austin' (1990)
- 'Lilac Rose' (1990)
- 'Peach Blossom' (1990)
- 'Bow Bells' (1991)
- 'Cottage Rose' (1991)
- 'Country Living' (1991)
- 'Evelyn' (1991)
- 'The Pilgrim' (1991)
- 'Doctor Jackson' (1992)
- 'Emily' (1992)
- 'Sir Edward Elgar' (1992)
- 'Glamis Castle' (1992)
- 'Golden Celebration' (1992)
- 'Prospero' (1982)
- 'Redouté' (1992)
- 'Charlotte' (1993)
- 'Happy Child' (1993)
- 'Tradescant' (1993)
- 'The Alexandra Rose' (1993)
- 'Eglantyne' (1994)
- 'Radio Times' (1994)
- 'Windflower' (1994)
- 'Heavenly Rosalind' (1995)
- 'Jude the Obscure' (1995)
- 'Pat Austin' (1995)
- 'Pegasus' (1995)
- 'Scepter'd Isle' (1996)
- 'A Shropshire Lad' (1996)
- 'Barbara Austin' (1997)
- 'Geoff Hamilton' (1998)
- 'Teasing Georgia' (1998)
- 'Anne Boleyn' (1999)
- 'Buttercup 98' (2000)
- 'England's Rose' (2000)
- 'Crown Princess Margareta' (2000)
- 'Grace' (2001)
- 'The Mayflower' (2001)
- 'William Shakespeare 2000' (2001)
- 'Comtes de Champagne' (2001)
- 'The Alnwick Rose' (2001)
- 'Christopher Marlowe' (2002)
- 'Jubilee Celebration' (2002)
- 'Wildeve' (2003)
- 'Scarborough Fair' (2003)
- 'Charles Darwin' (2003)
- 'Rosemoor' (2004)
- 'Queen of Sweden' (2004)
- 'Hyde Hall' (2004)
- 'Harlow Carr' (2004)
- 'Carding Mill' (2004)
- 'Gentle Hermione' (2005)
- 'Summer Song' (2005)
- 'The Shepherdess' (2005)
- 'Darcey Bussell' (2006)
- 'Huntington Rose' (2006)
- 'Lady of Megginch' (2006)
- 'Lichfield Angel' (2006)
- 'Strawberry Hill' (2006)
- 'Tea Clipper' (2006)
- 'Claire Austin' (2007)
- 'Lady Emma Hamilton' (2007)
- 'Munstead Wood' (2007)
- 'Port Sunlight' (2007)
- 'Young Lycidas' (2008)
- 'Kew Gardens' (2009)
- 'The Wegdwood Rose' (2009)
- 'Lady of Shalott' (2009)
- 'Princess Anne' (2010)
- 'Susan William-Ellis' (2010)
- 'The Lady's Blush' (2010)
- 'William and Catherine' (2011)
- 'Boscobel' (2012)
- 'Tranquillity' (2012)
- 'Royal Jubilee' (2012)
- 'Thomas A Becket' (2013)
- 'The Albrighton Rambler' (2013)
- 'Olivia Rose Austin' (2014)
- 'The Lady of the Lake' (2014)
- 'The Poets Wife' (2014)
- 'Sir Walter Scott' (2015)
- 'The Ancient Mariner (2015)
- 'Desdemona' (2015)
- 'Bathsheba' (2016)
- 'Imogen' (2016)
- 'Roald Dahl' (2016)
- 'Vanessa Bell' (2017)
- 'Dame Judi Dench' (2017)
- 'Emily Brontë' (2018)
- 'The Mill on the Floss' (2018)
- 'Tottering-by-gently' (2018)
- 'Eustacia Vye' (2019)
- 'Gabriel Oak' (2019)
- 'Silas Marner' (2020)
- 'The Country Parson' (2020)
- 'Nye Bevan' (2021)
- 'Bring Me Sunshine' (2022)
- 'Elizabeth' (2022)
- 'Dannahue' (2023)
- 'Penelope Lively' (2023)
- 'Emma Bridgewater' (2024)
- ‘The King’s Rose’ (2025)
- ‘Sir David Beckham’ (2026)

=== Selection of images ===
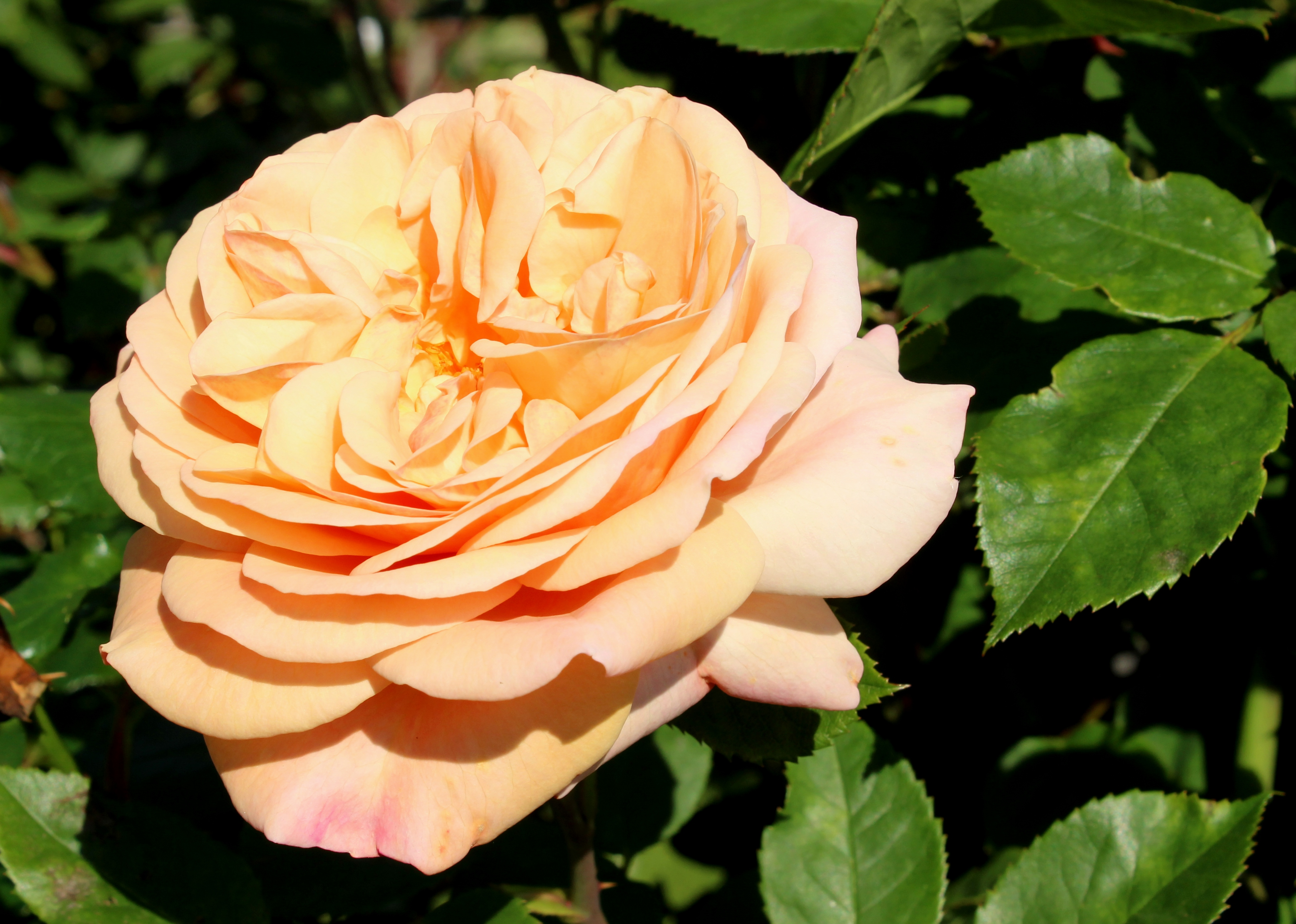
'Abraham Darby'

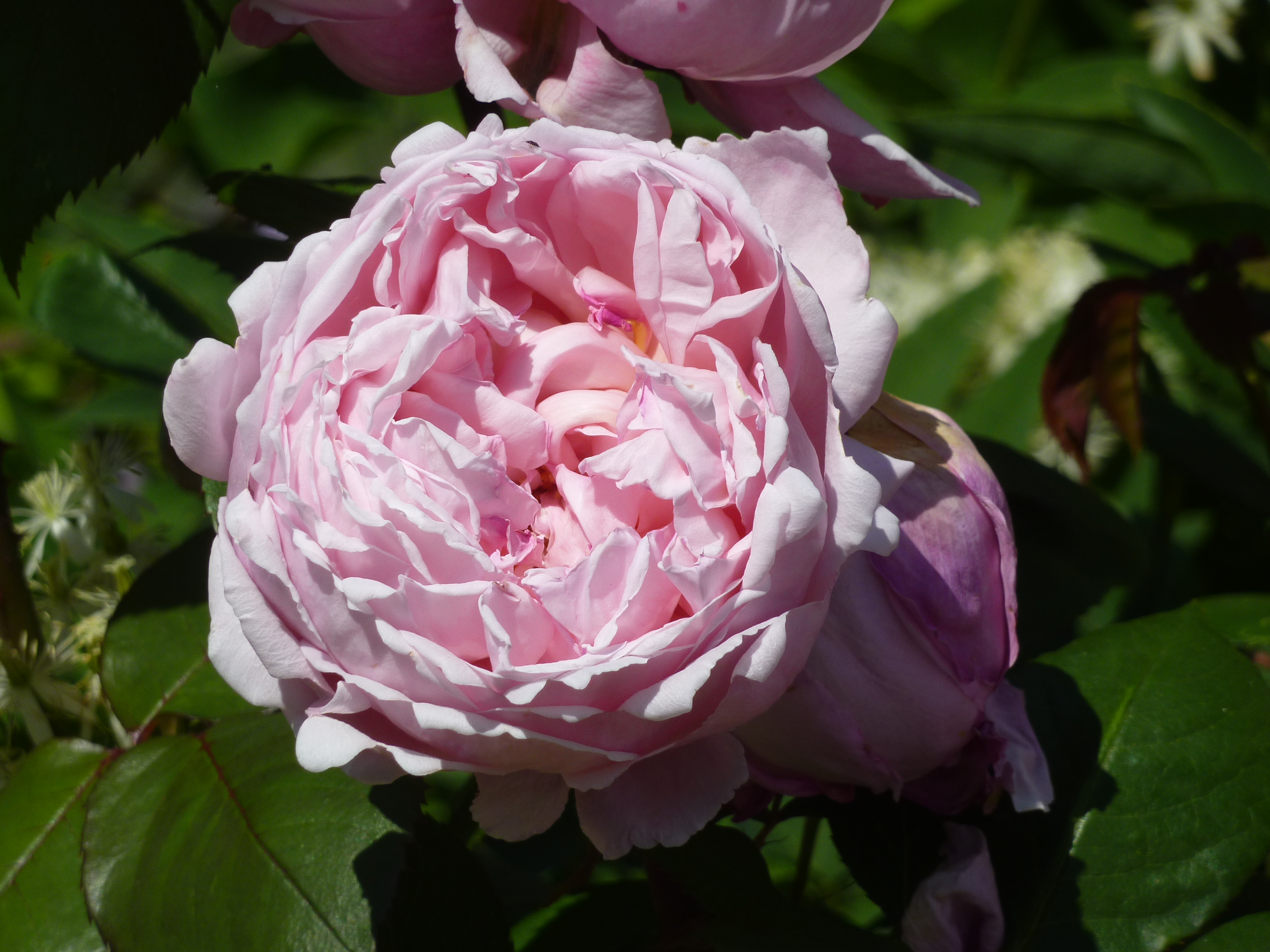
'Brother Cadfael'

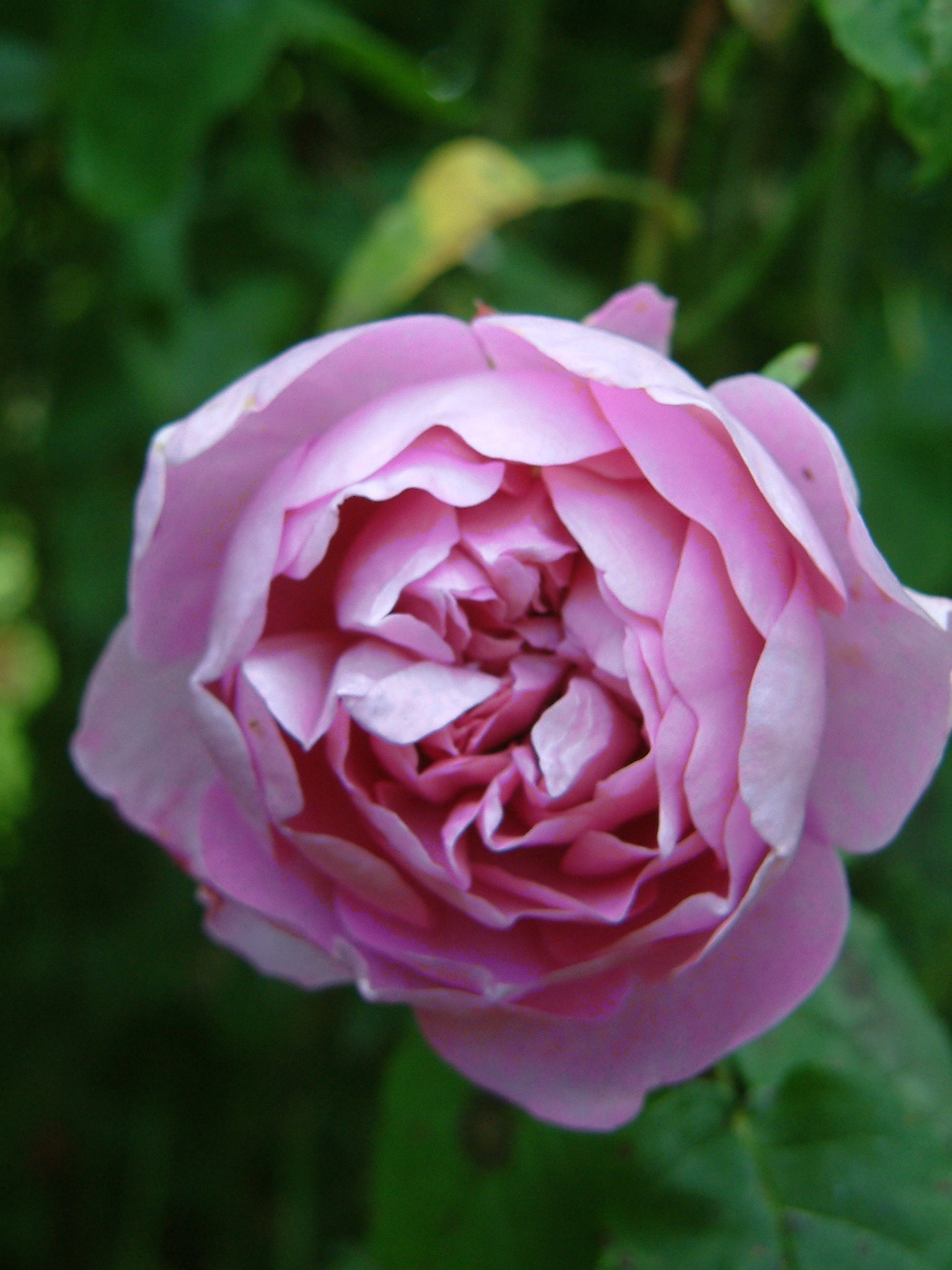
'Charles Rennie Mackintosh'

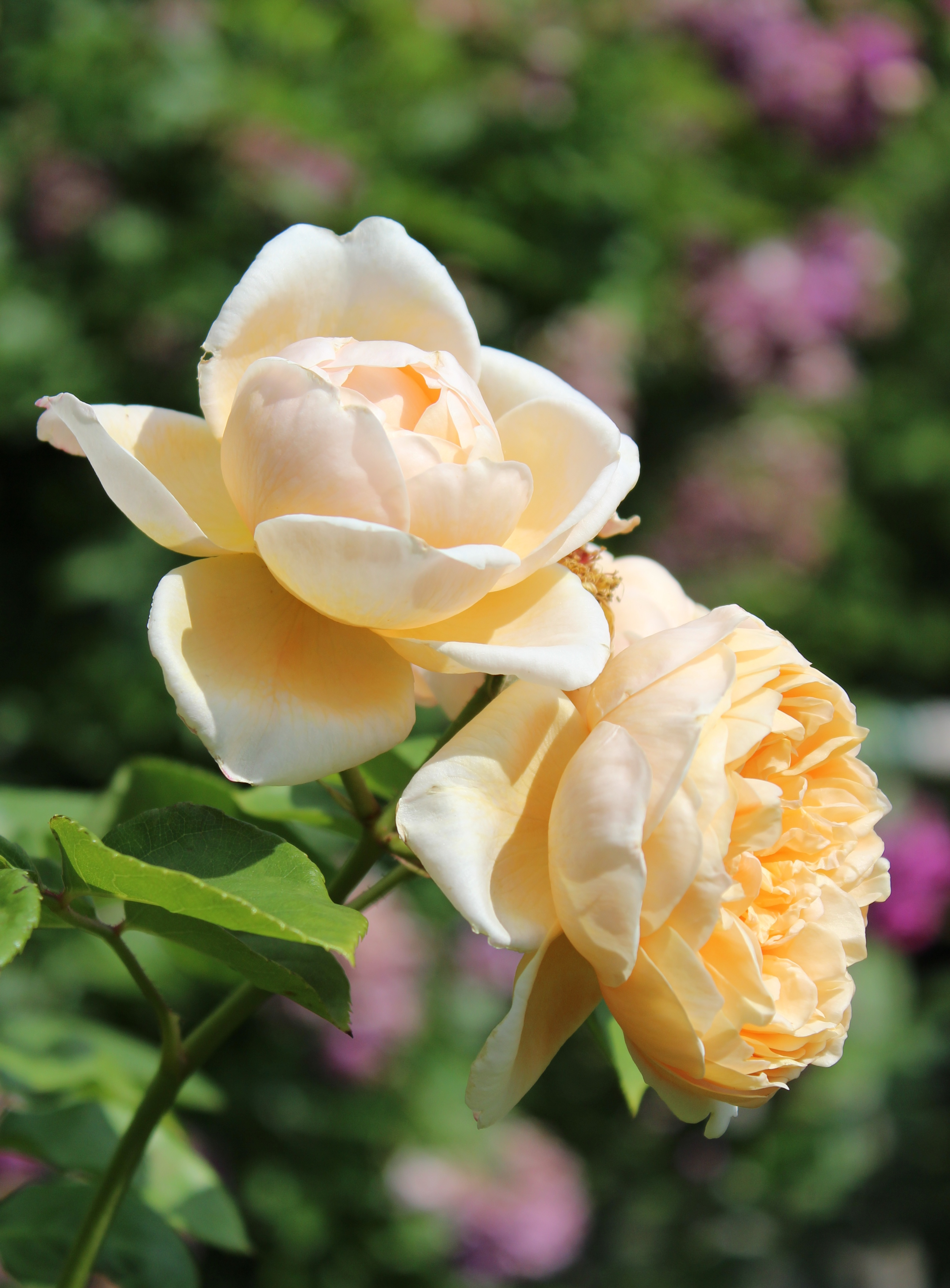
'Charlotte'

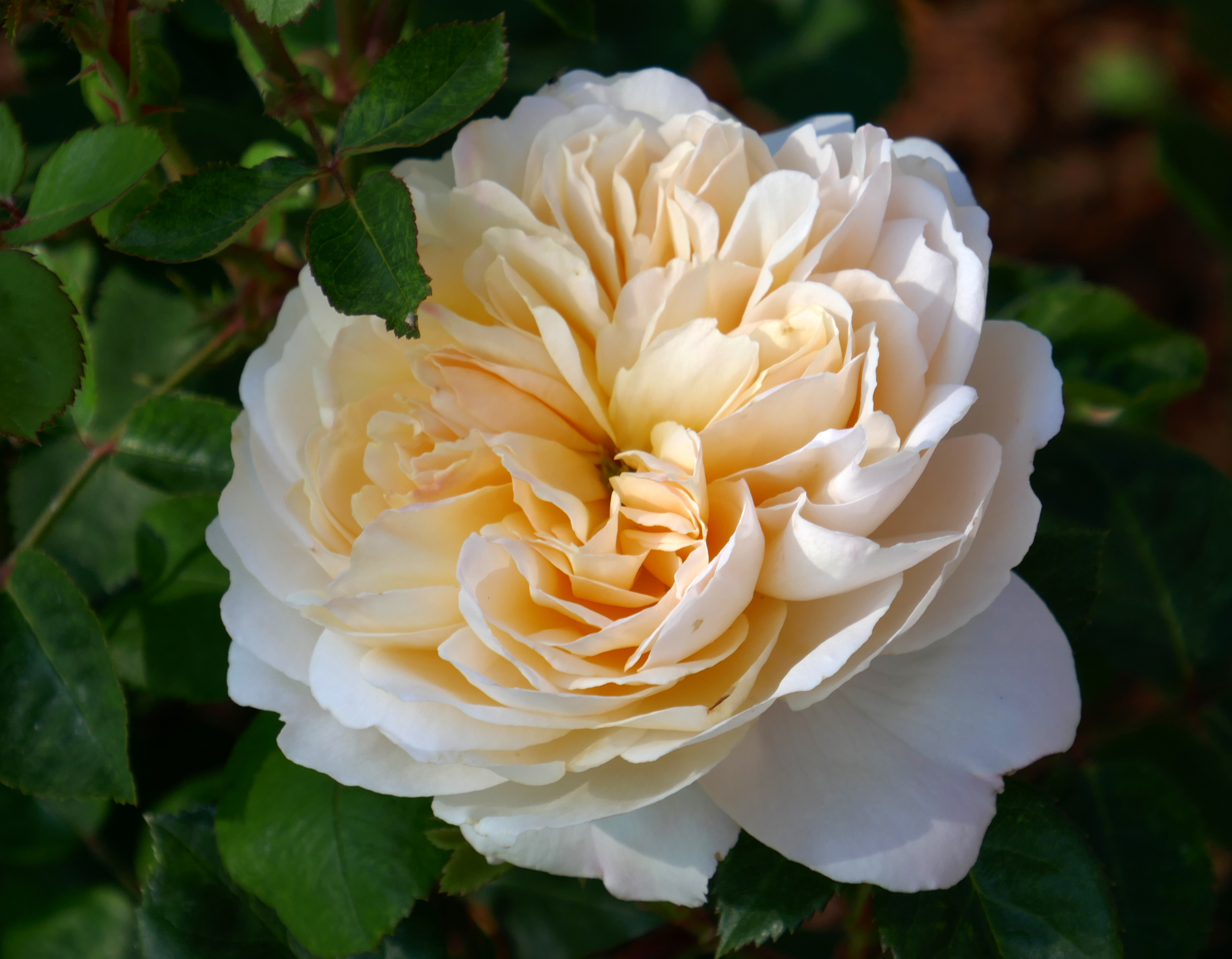
'Crocus Rose'

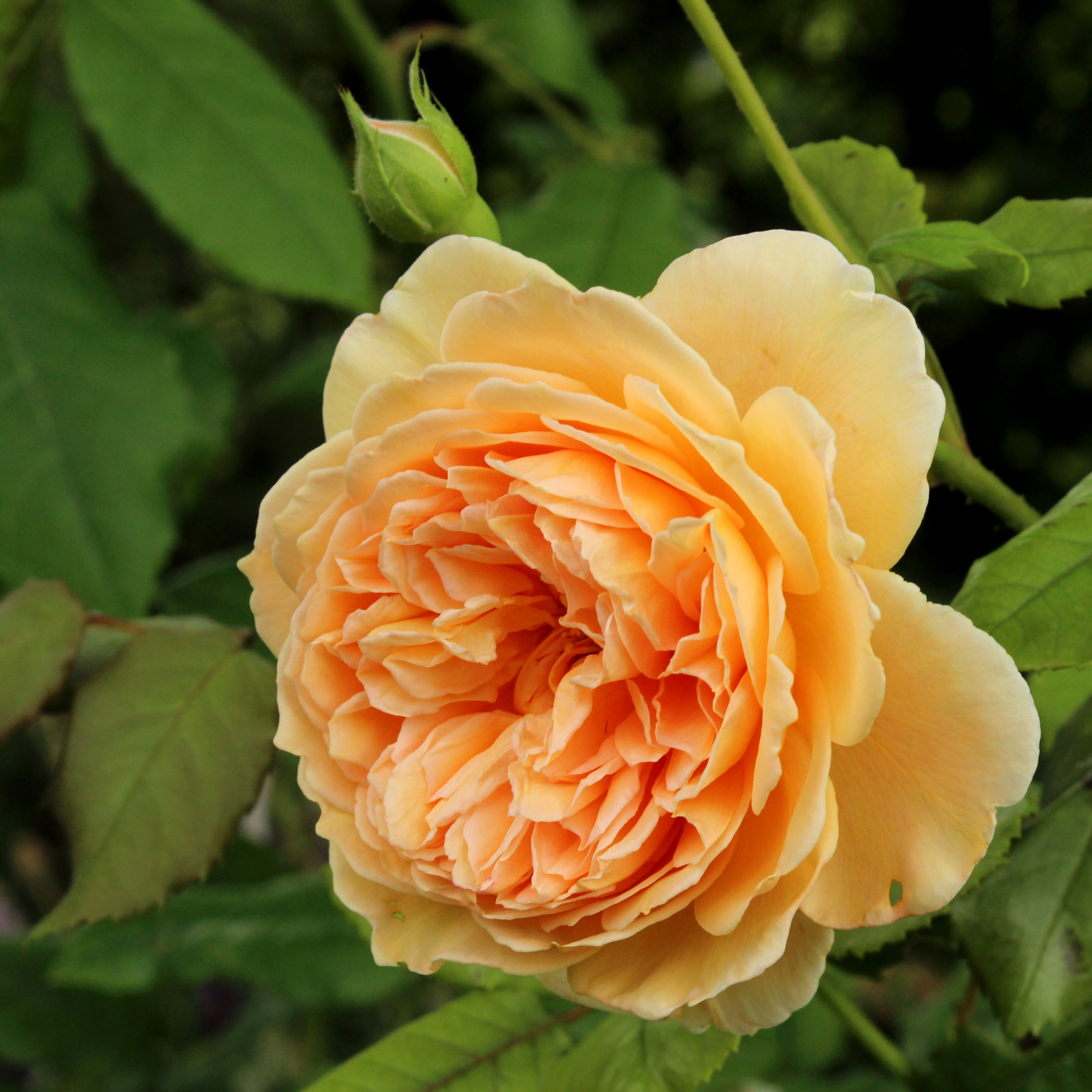
'Crown Princess Margareta'

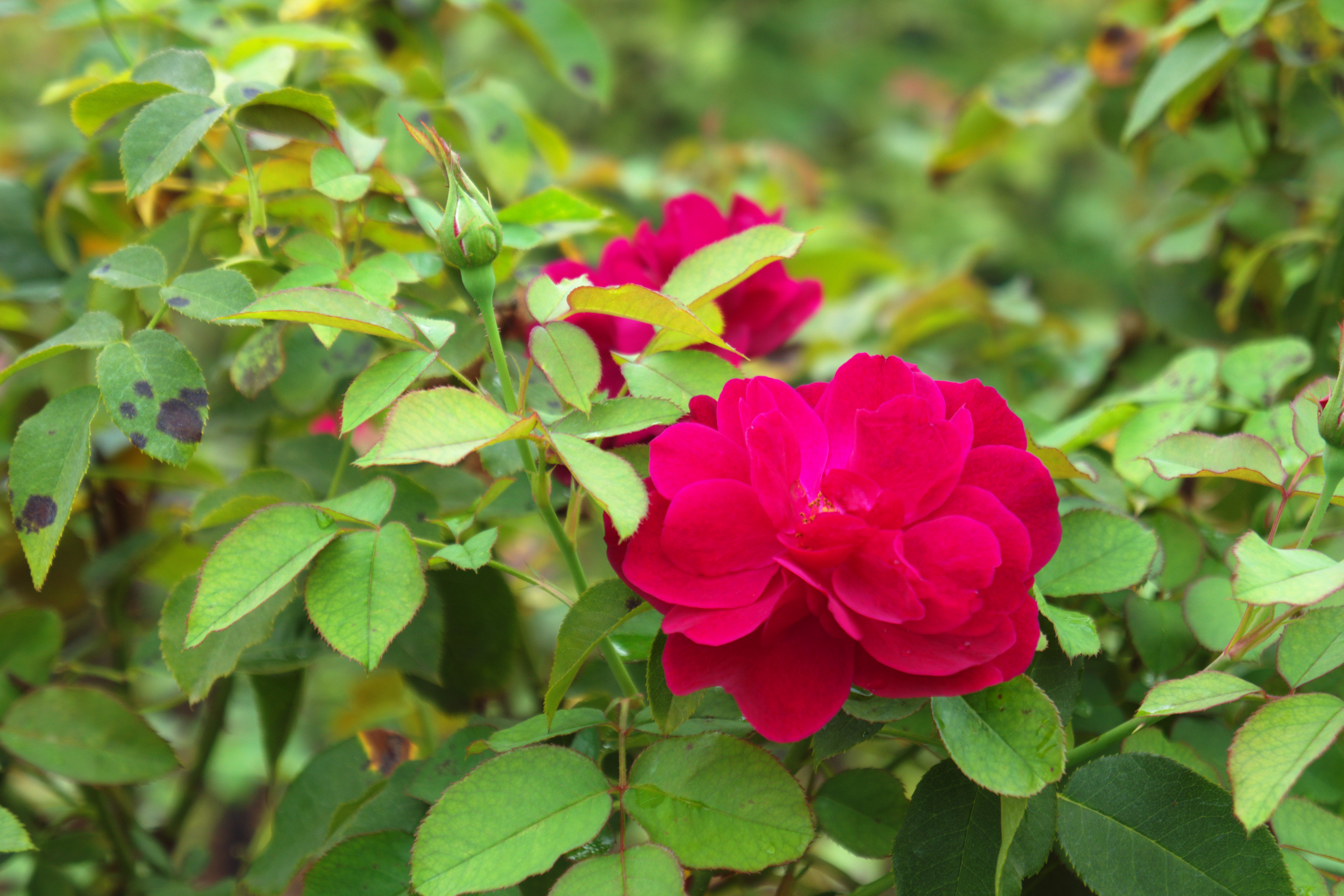
'Darcey Bussell'

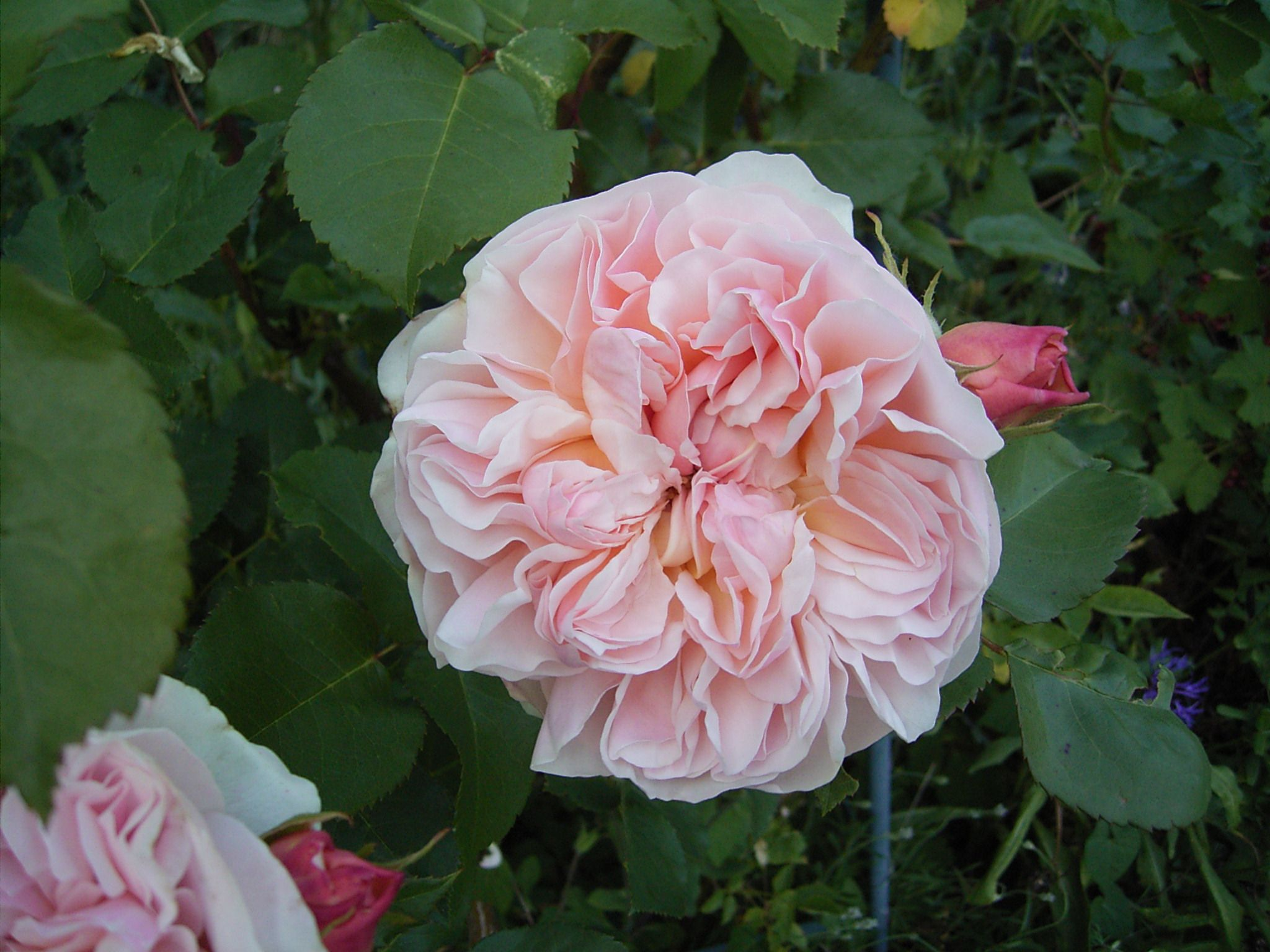
'Evelyn'

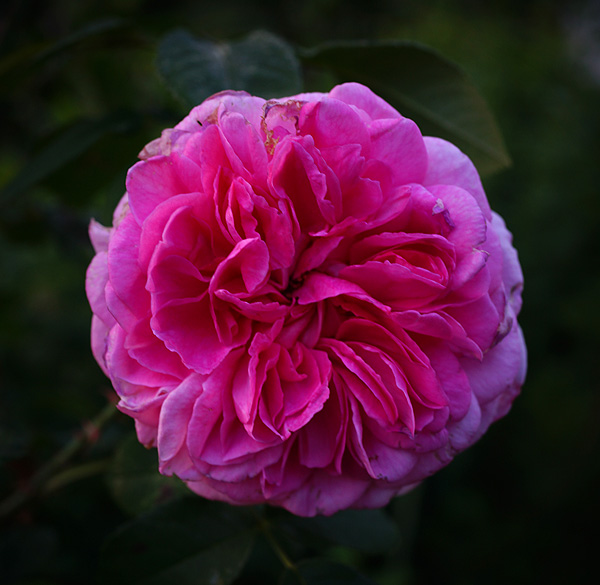
'Gertrude Jekyll'

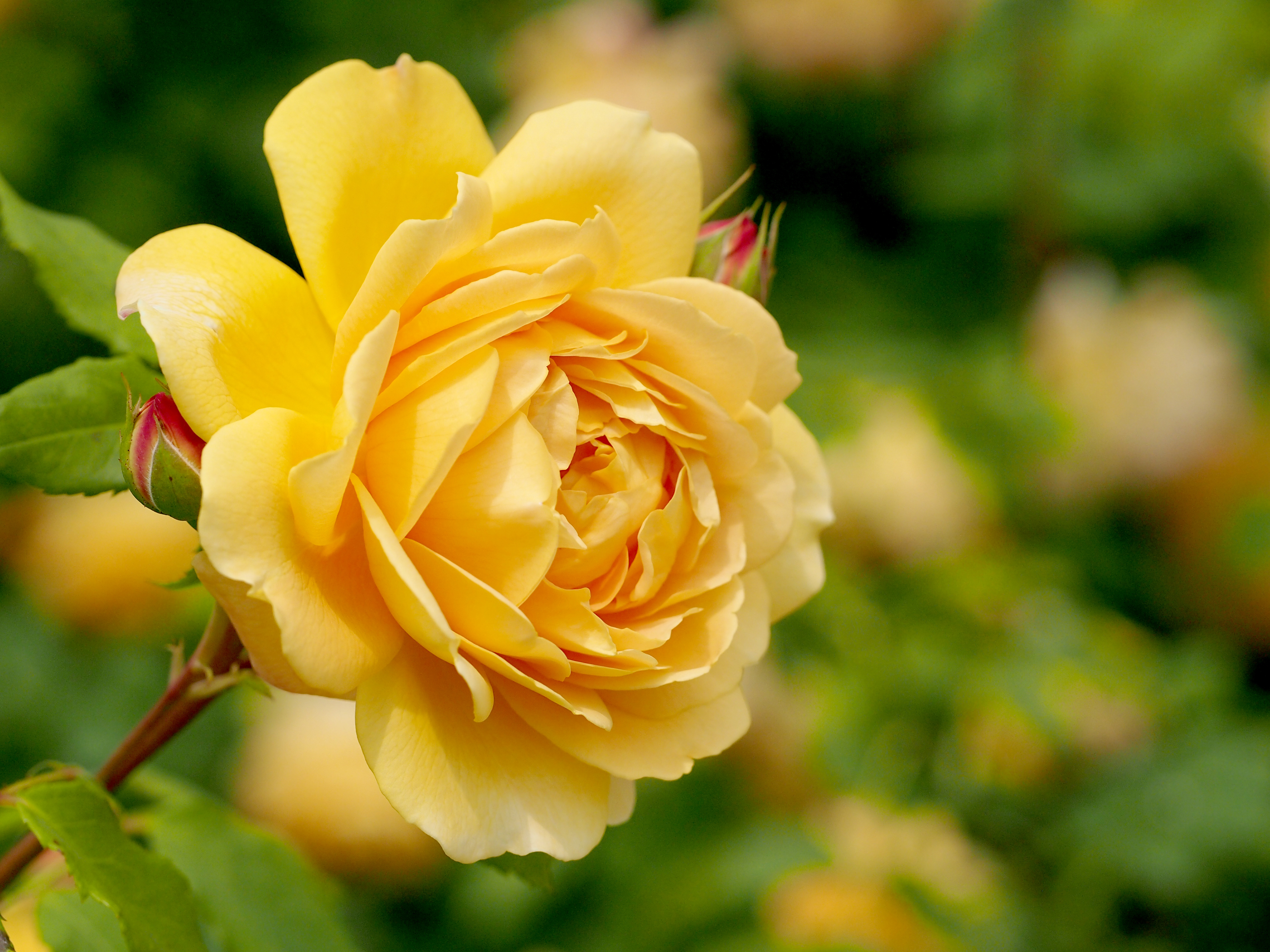
'Golden Celebration'

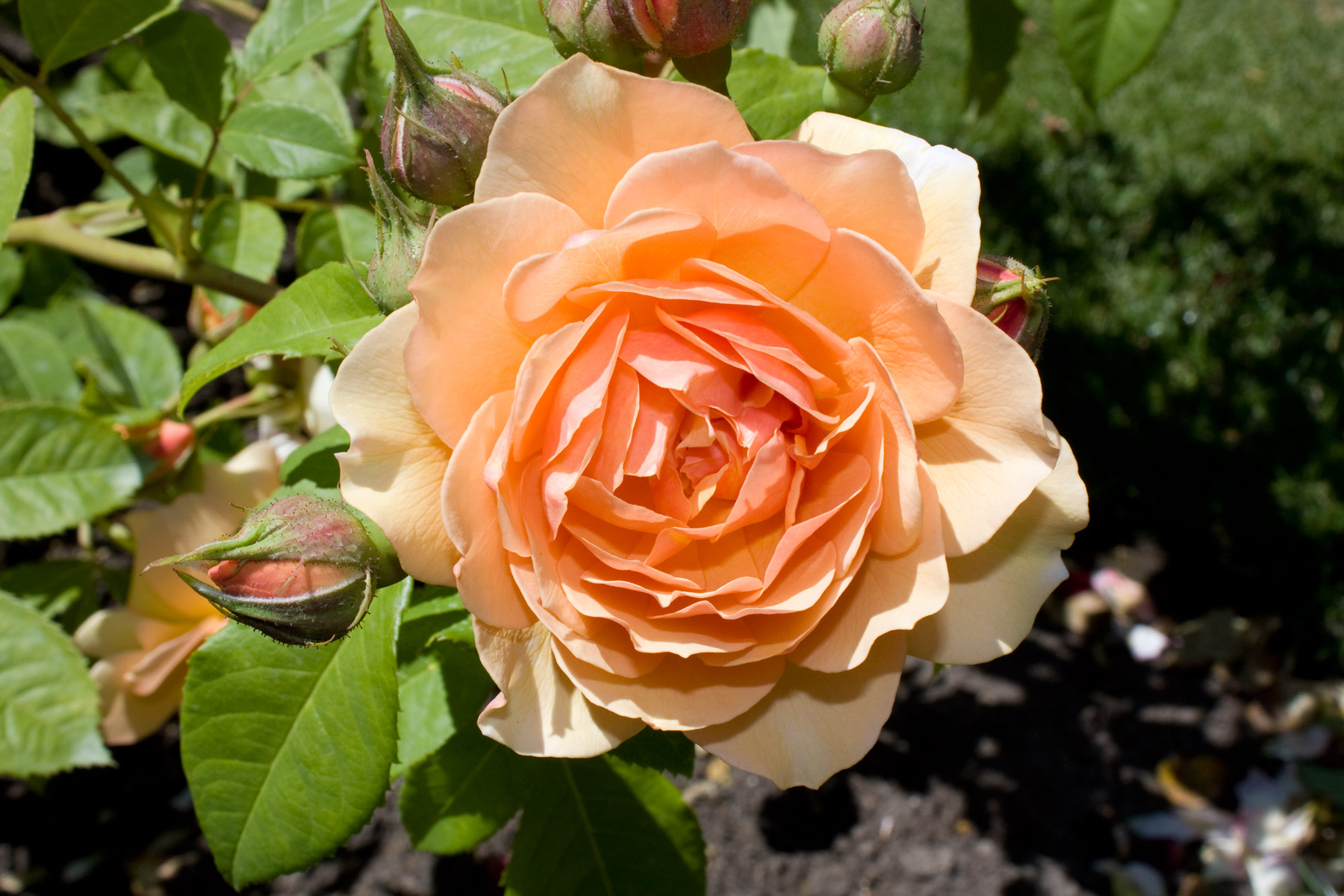
'Grace'

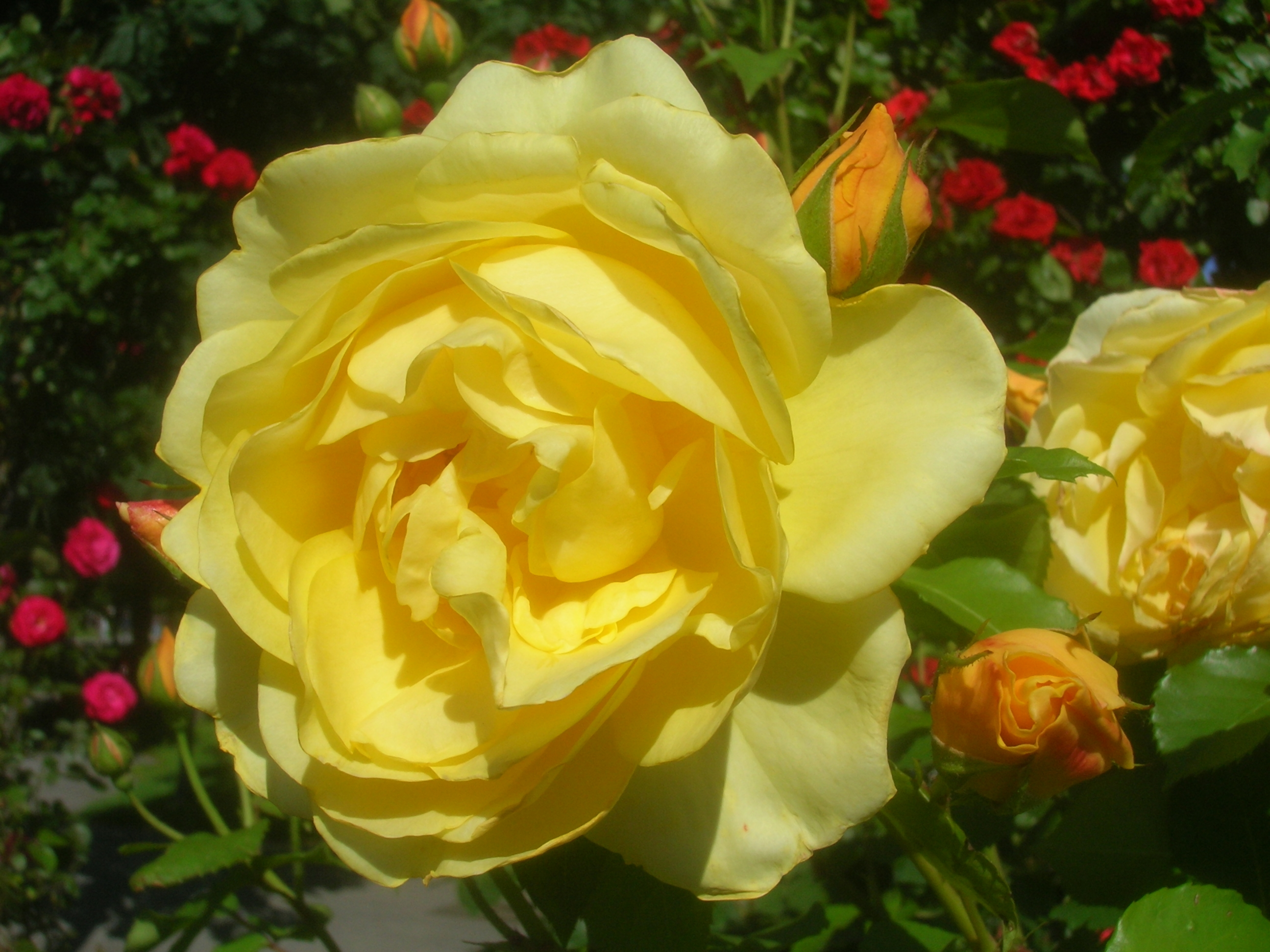
'Graham Thomas'

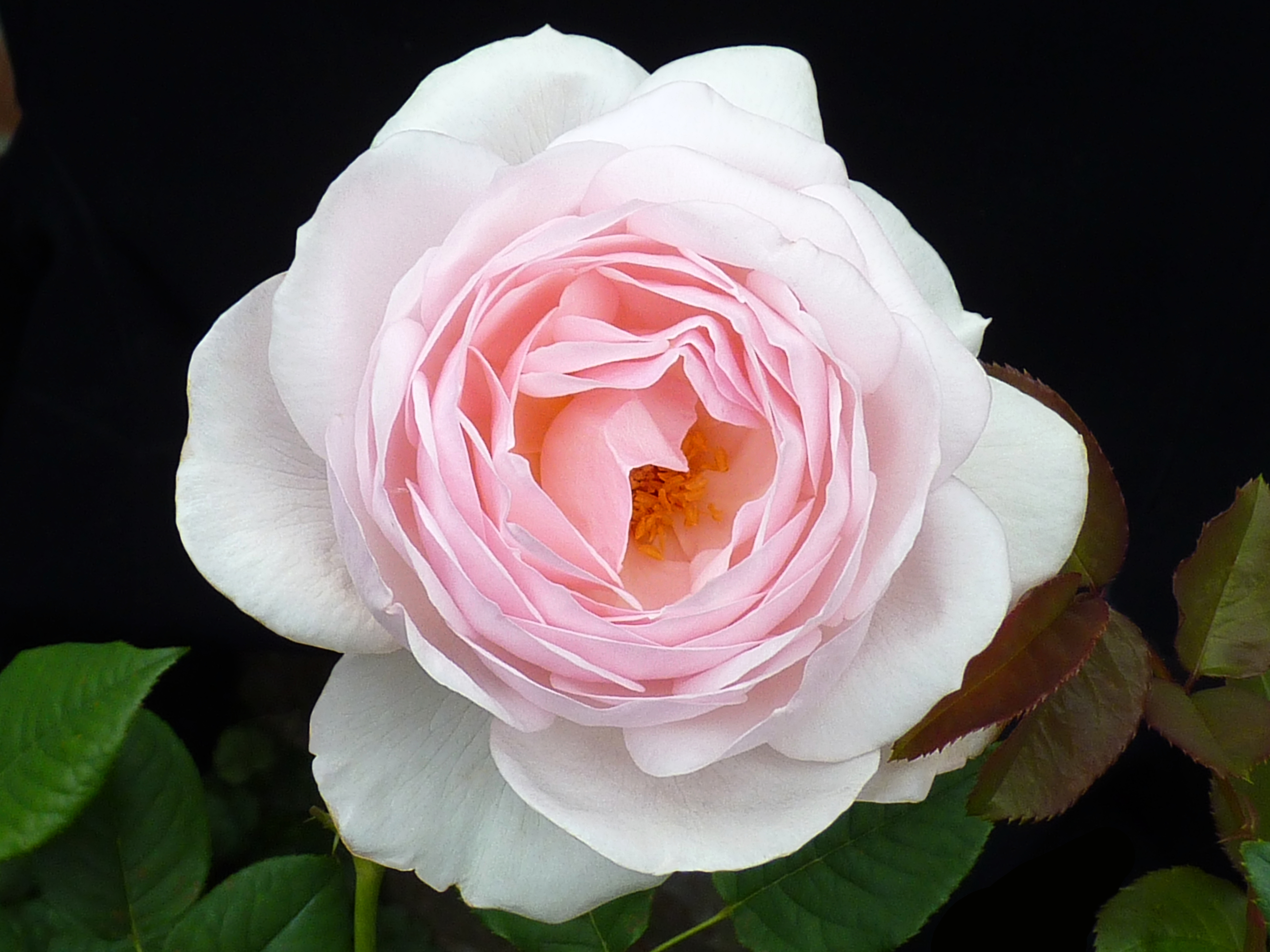
'Heritage'

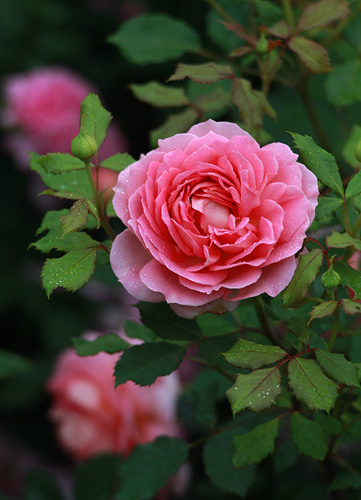
'Jubilee Celebration'

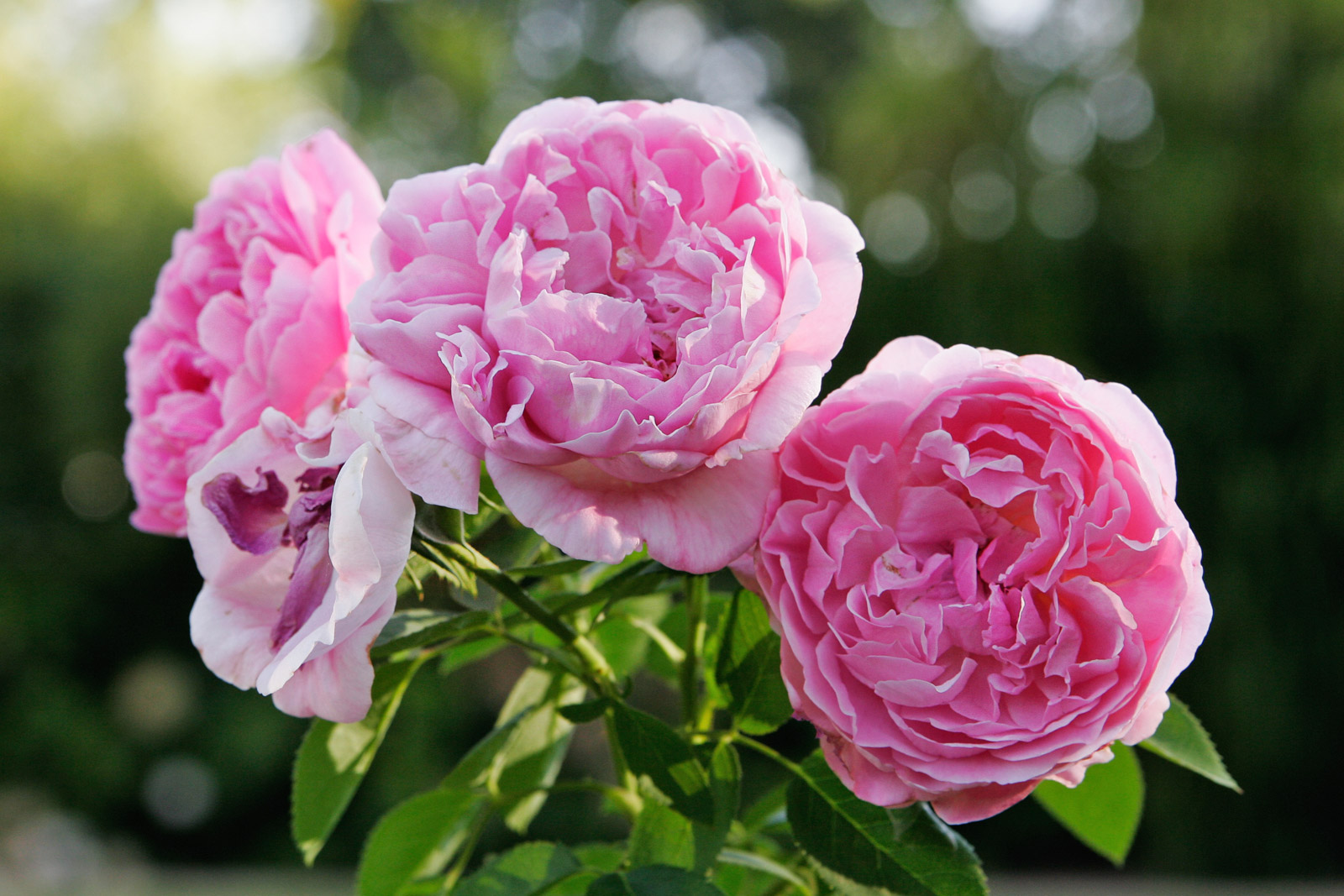
'Mary Rose'

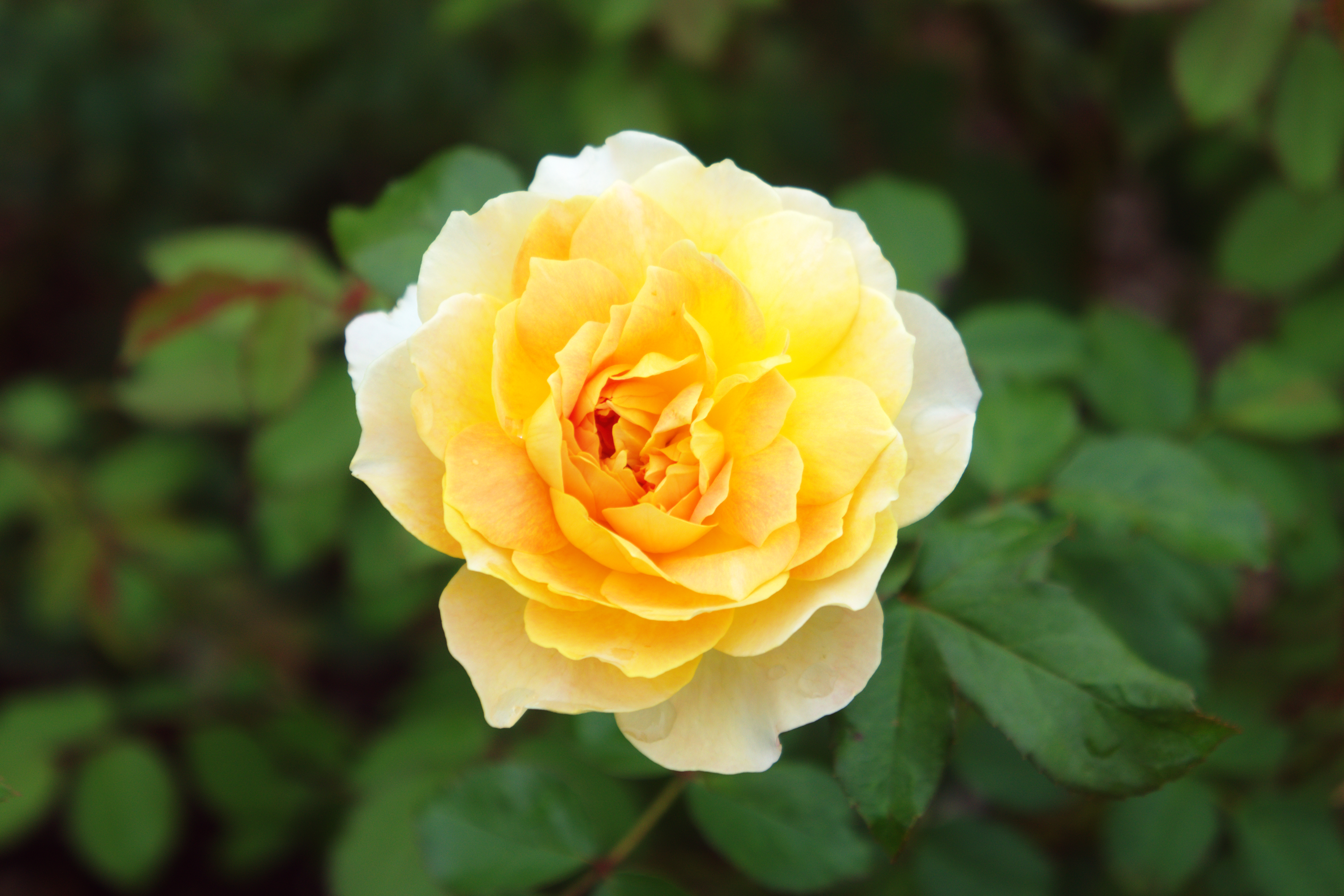
'Molineux'

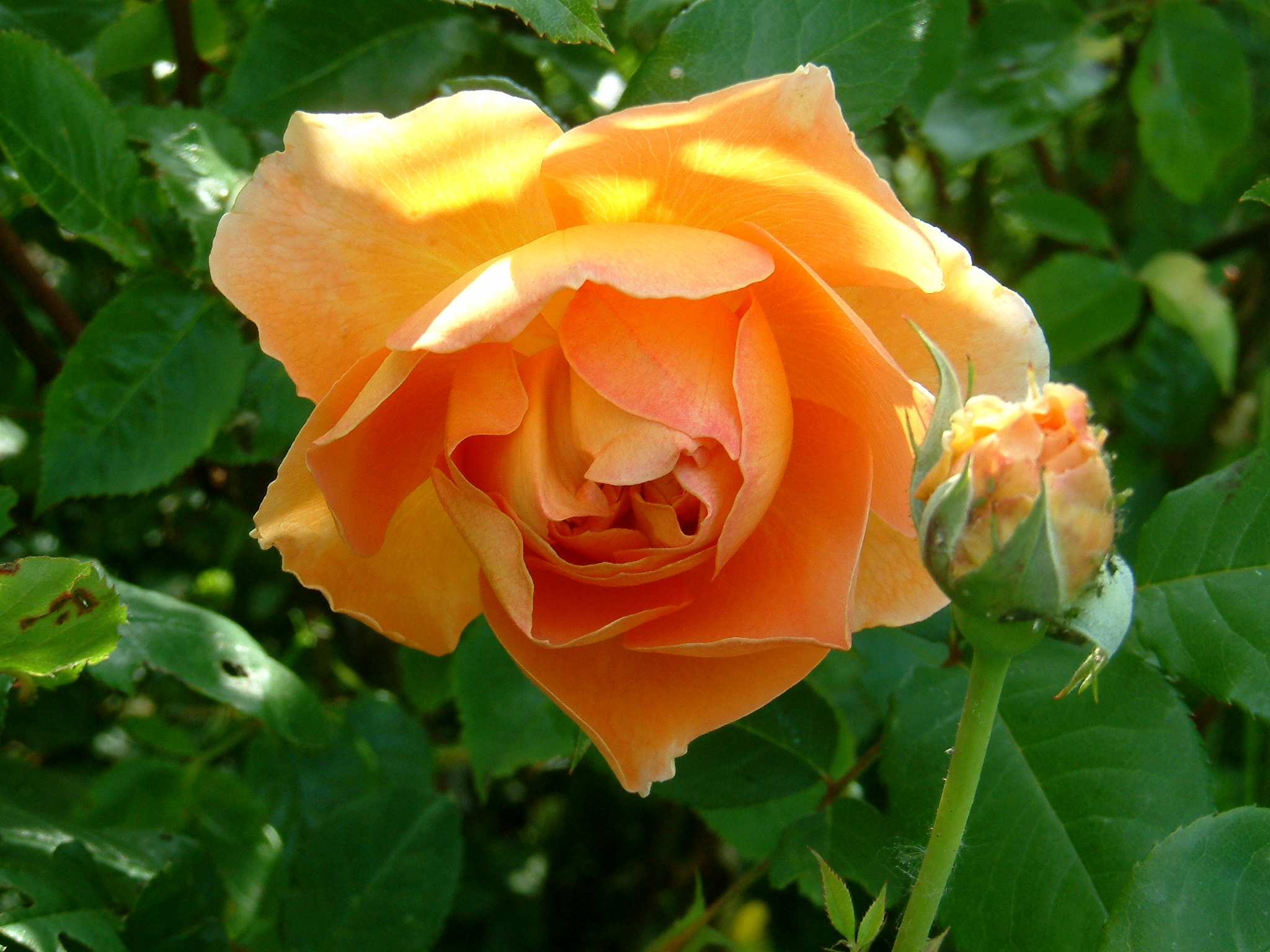
'Pat Austin'

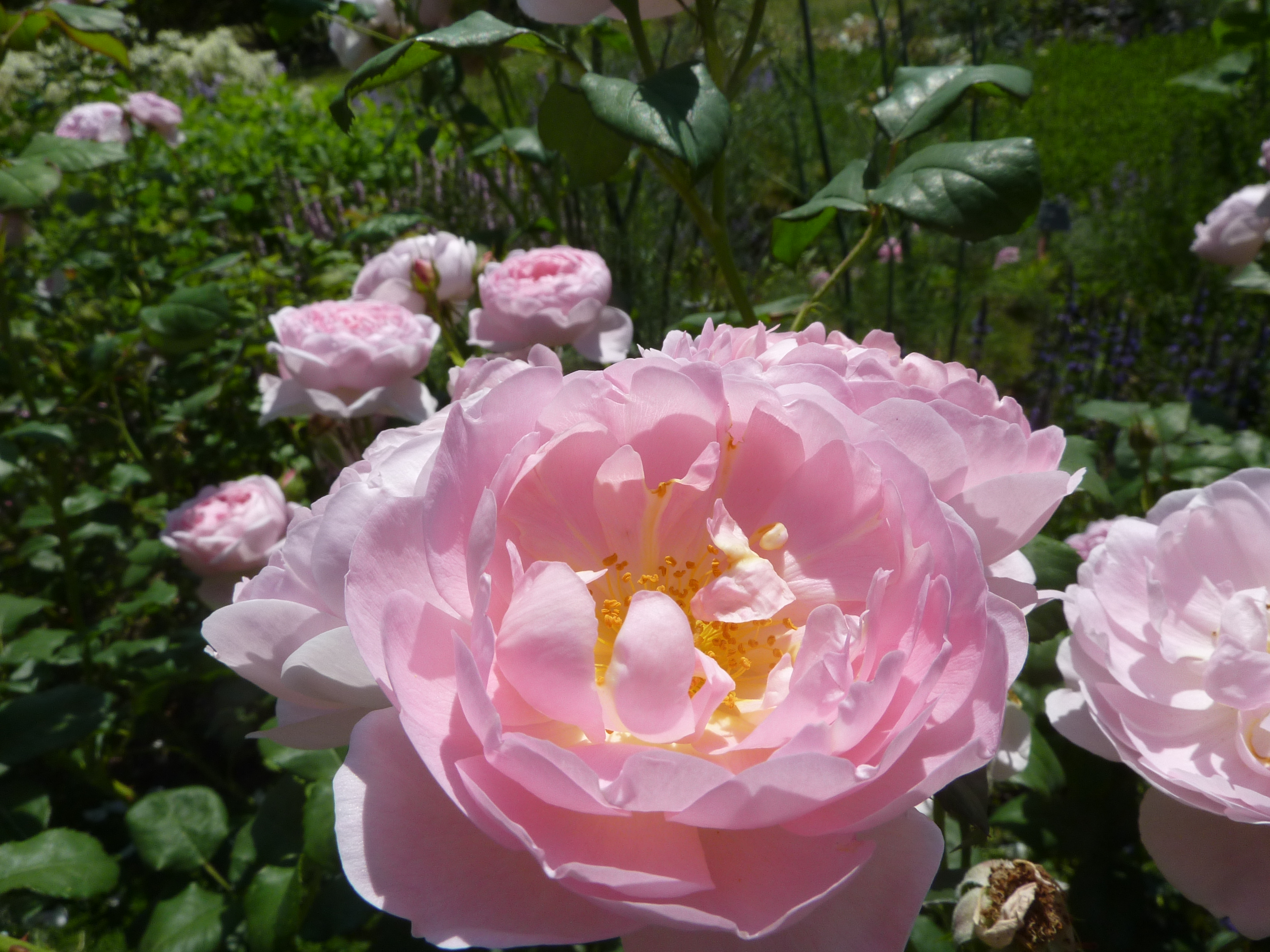
'Scepter'd Isle'

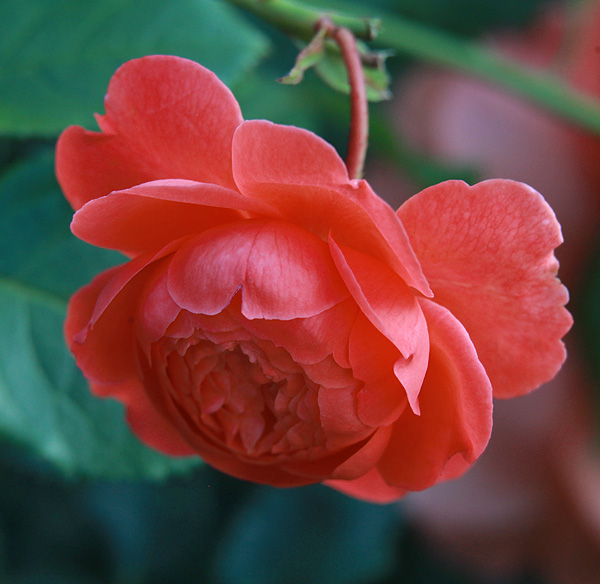
'Summer Song'

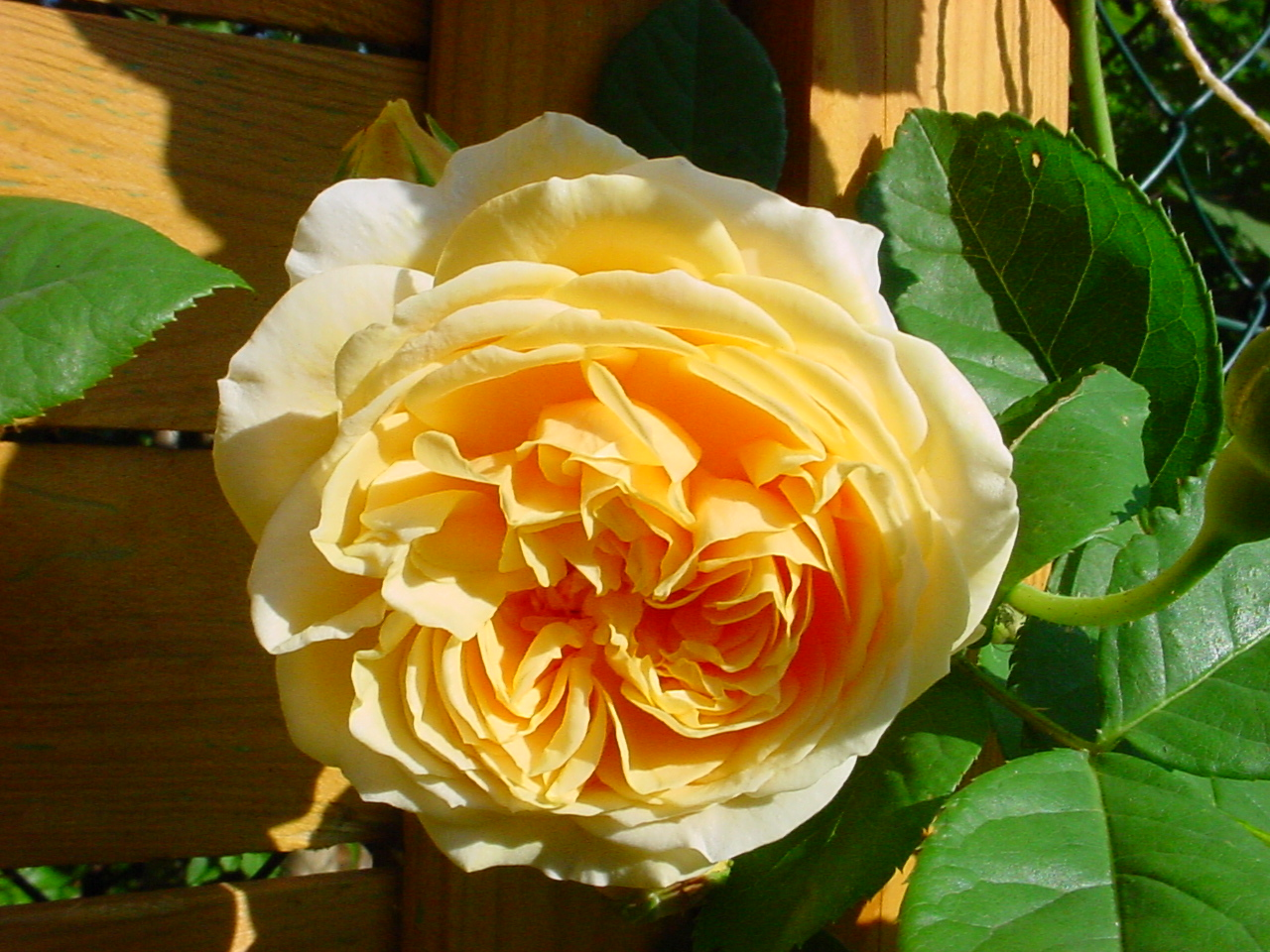
'Teasing Georgia'

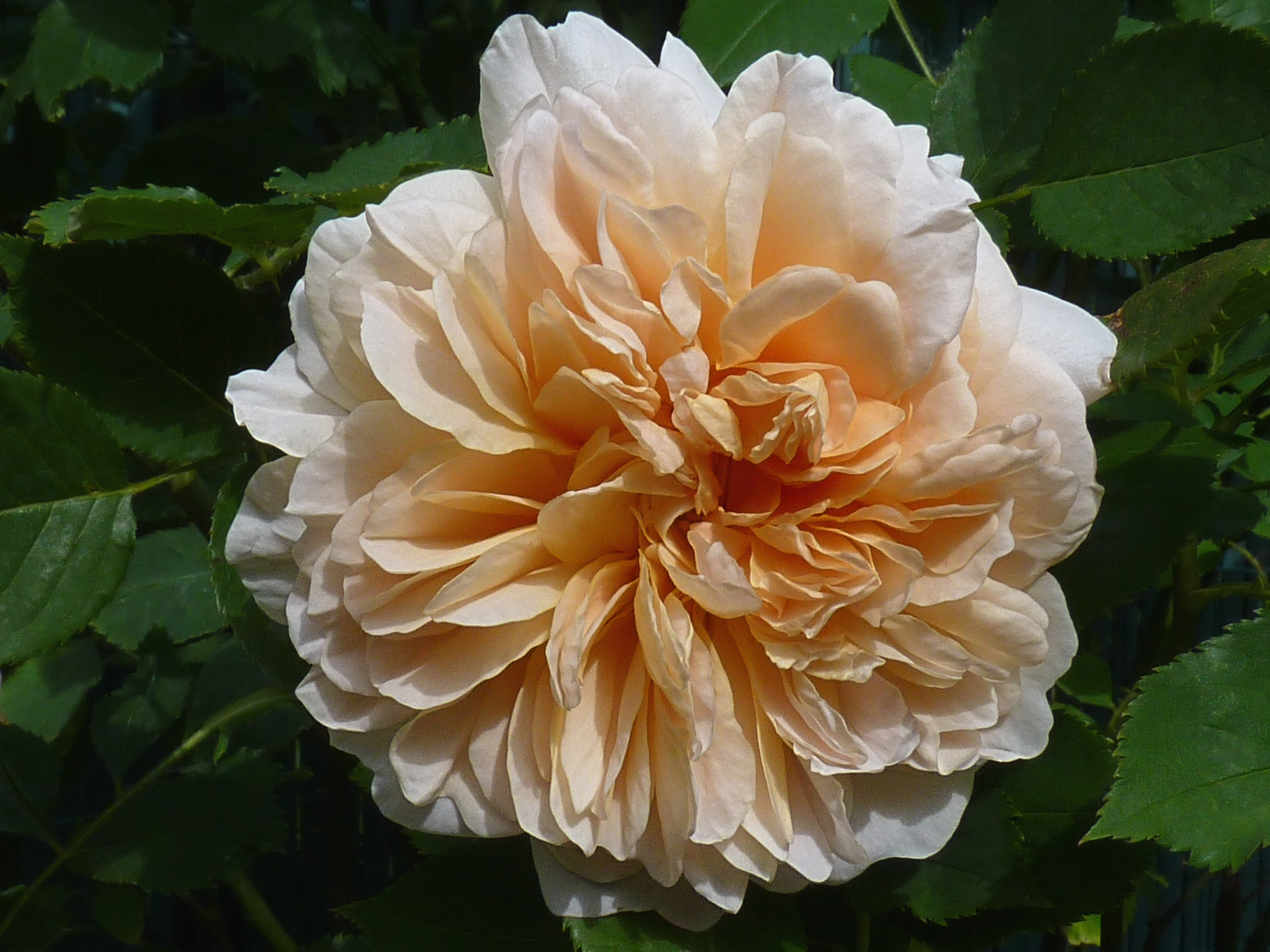
'Tea Clipper'

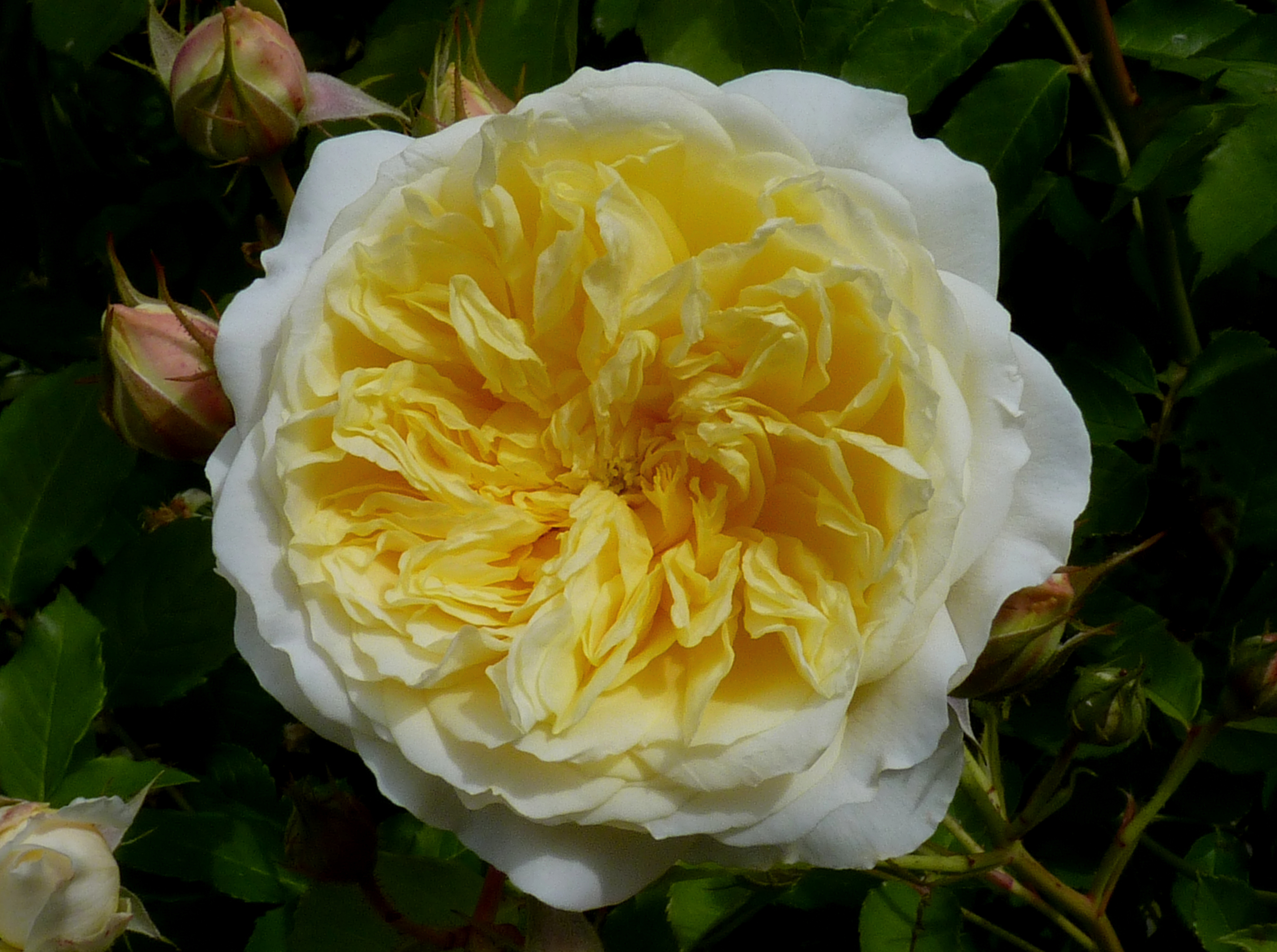
'The Pilgrim'

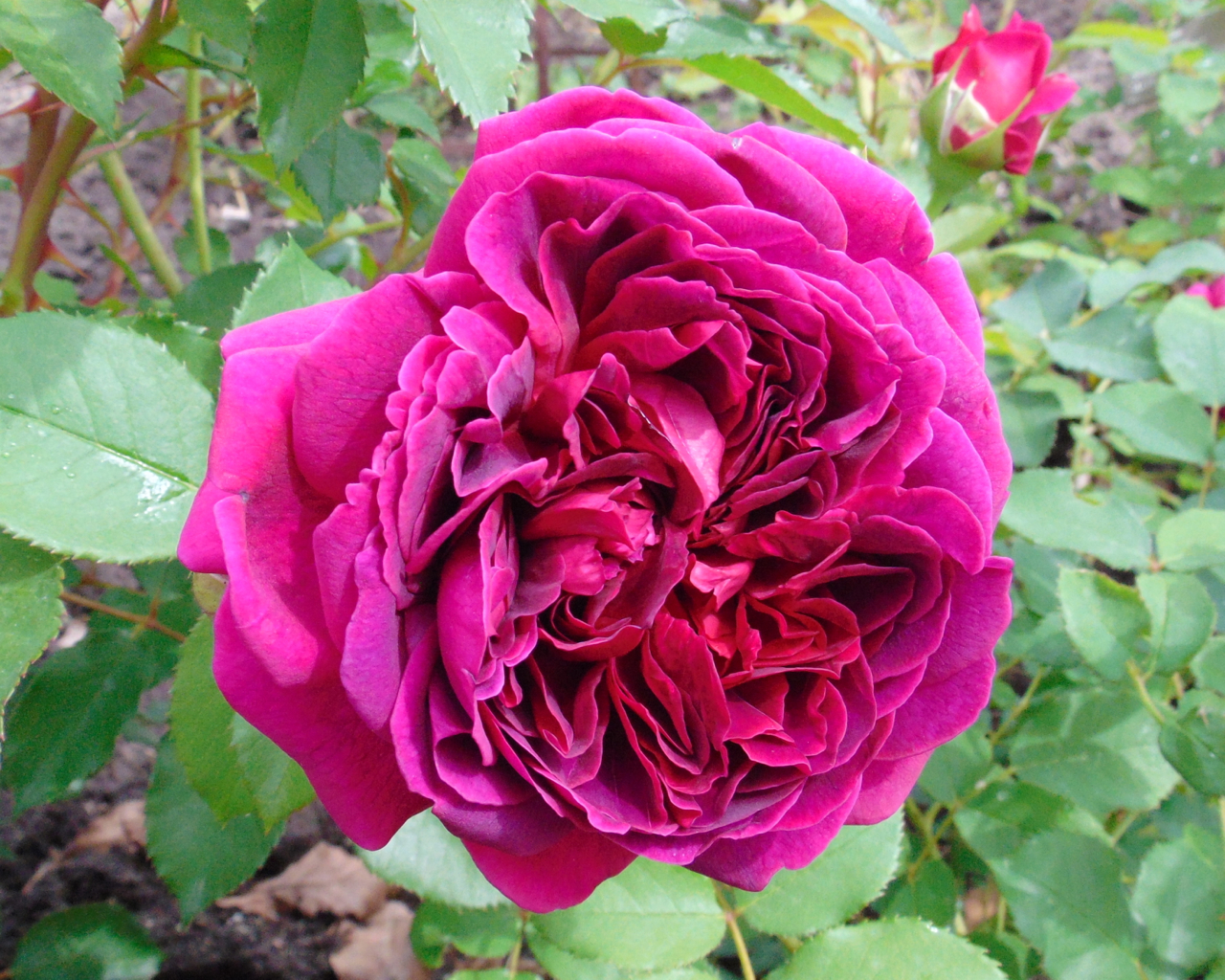
'William Shakespeare 2000'

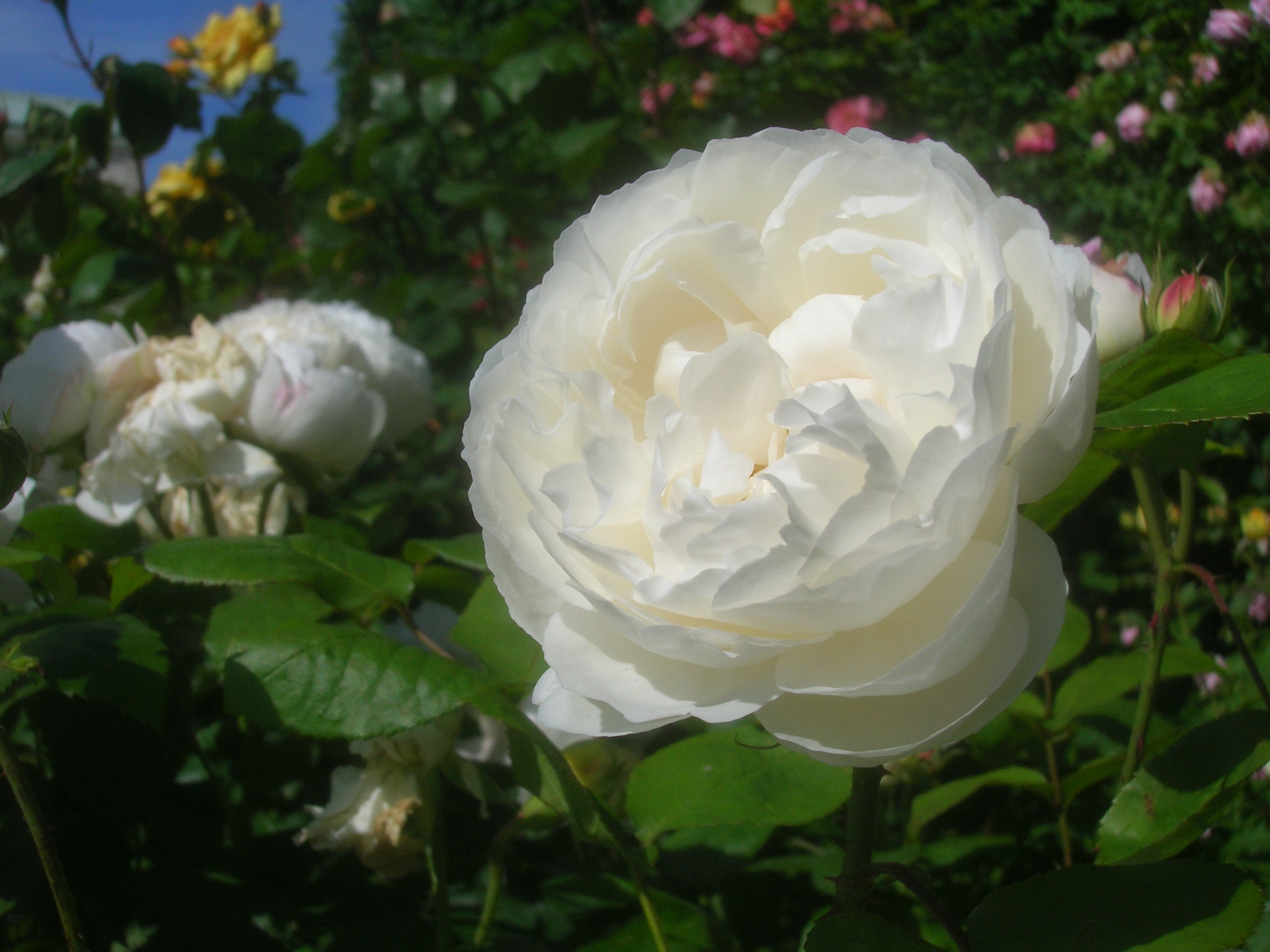
'Winchester Cathedral'
