= Michael Marriott (rosarian) =

English horticulturalist and author

Michael V Marriott is one of Britain's foremost rosarians.

== Life and work ==
Michael Marriott graduated in agricultural botany from the University of Reading in 1976. He then worked in Pacific regions growing cocoa, rubber and palm oil. Following this, he built a career in rose horticulture over 35 years, with David Austin Roses from 1985, initially as Nursery Manager and latterly as Senior Rosarian. He supported the work of David Austin (1926-2018), who introduced more than 230 modern English roses. Marriott has designed rose gardens internationally, including sites at Windsor Castle, the Royal Botanic Gardens Kew, Queen Mary’s Garden in Regent’s Park and Hampton Court Palace. He has also advised Prince Charles with his gardens at Highgrove House. He lectures internationally, consults and writes on rose cultivation.

Marriott is described as one of "the world’s most respected rose experts" and "a world authority on roses". He has worked with the Royal Horticultural Society to create their rose guide (2022). He runs his own gardens organically, without sprays and is an advocate of organic horticulture.

== Works ==
- RHS Roses (2022)
- David Austin's English Roses, ed. (2021)
