= Rosa 'Savoy Hotel' =

Light pink hybrid tea rose cultivar

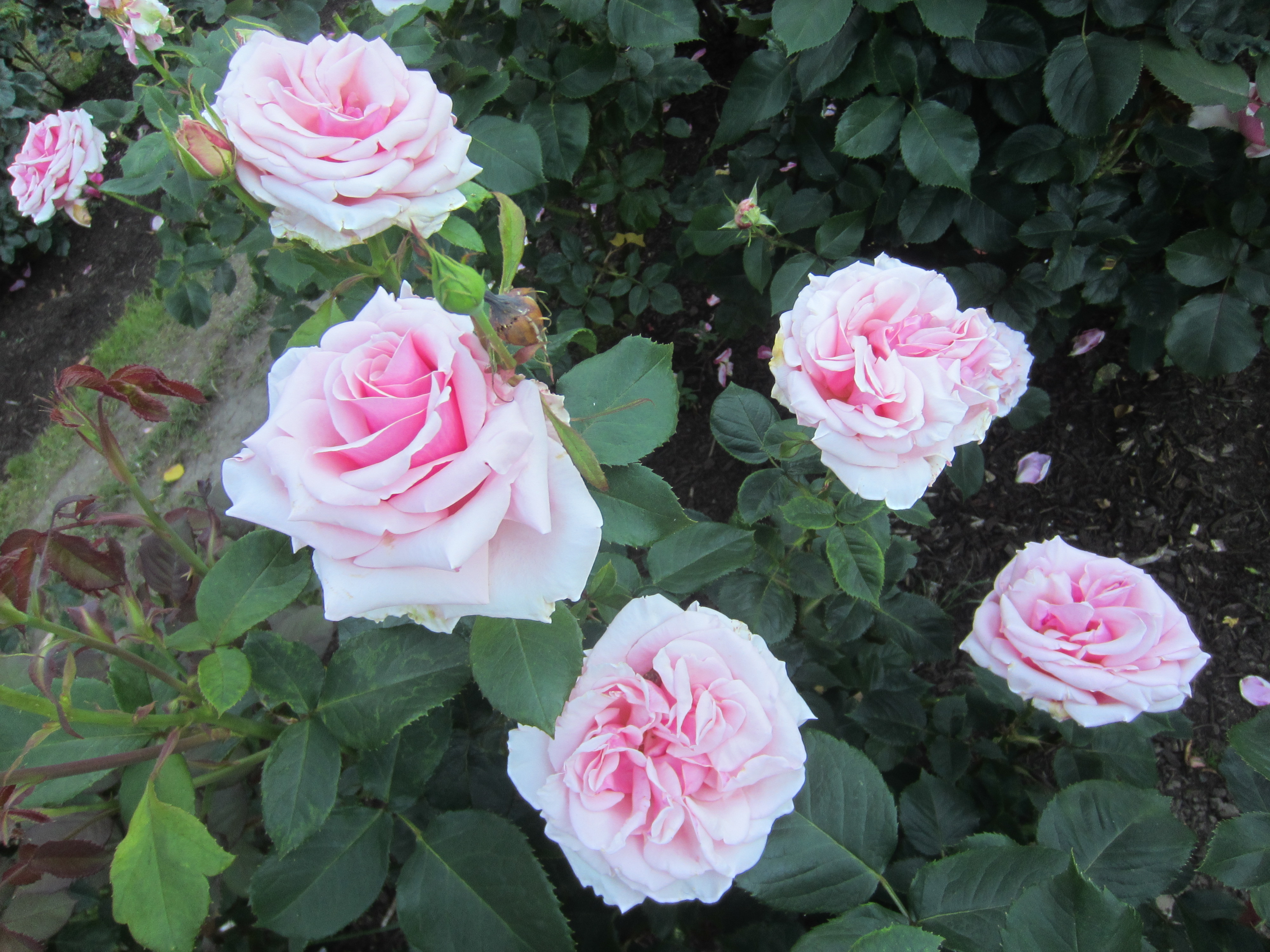
- Rosa 'Savoy Hotel'
- Genus: Rosa hybrid
- Hybrid parentage: 'Silver Jubilee x 'Amber Queen'
- Cultivar group: Hybrid tea rose
- Cultivar: 'HARvintage'
- Marketing names: 'Integrity', 'Violette Niestlé', 'Savoy Hotel'
- Breeder: Jack Harkness
- Origin: U.K., 1987

Rosa 'Savoy Hotel' is a light pink hybrid tea rose cultivar, developed by Jack Harkness in 1987 and introduced into Great Britain by Harkness Roses in 1989. The rose was named to celebrate the centenary of the Savoy Hotel, a famous London hotel.

== Description ==
'Savoy Hotel' is a short, large-flowered, upright rose, 2 to 3 ft (0.61–0.91 m) in height, with a 2 to 3 ft (0.61–0.91 m) spread. The rose is a vigorous grower and has a moderate fruity scent. Its flowers are 6 in (150 mm) in diameter, with a large, double high-centered bloom form. Bloom colour is silvery pink with a darker pink reverse. Flowers are borne mostly solitary on long stems. Leaves are medium in size, semi-glossy and dark green. The rose blooms in flushes throughout the growing season.

== Harkness Roses ==
Harkness Roses was established in 1879 in Bedale, Yorkshire by brothers, John Harkness (1857–1933) and Robert Harkness (1851–1920). In 1882, John and Robert began to grow and exhibit roses. Their new rose business was a great success; Queen Victoria purchased her roses from Harkness & Sons in the 1890s. John and Robert soon realized that Yorkshire's climate was too cold for an expanding rose growing business. In 1892, they decided to established a branch of the firm in a location with a warmer climate. Neither brother wanted to leave Yorkshire, so it was decided by a coin toss that Robert would move to Hitchin, Hertfordshire to establish the new branch of Harkness and Sons. In 1901, John and Robert decided to dissolve the company and create two separate nurseries. Robert established R. Harkness & Co, today known as Harknes Roses.

== 'Savoy Hotel' ==
The cultivar was developed by Austin in 1987 from a cross between the hybrid tea, 'Silver Jubilee' and the Floribunda, 'Amber Queen'. The rose was named to celebrate the centenary of the Savoy Hotel, a famous London hotel. introduced into the Uk by Harkness Roses in 1989.
