= Rosa 'Bridge of Sighs' =

Apricot climbing rose cultivar

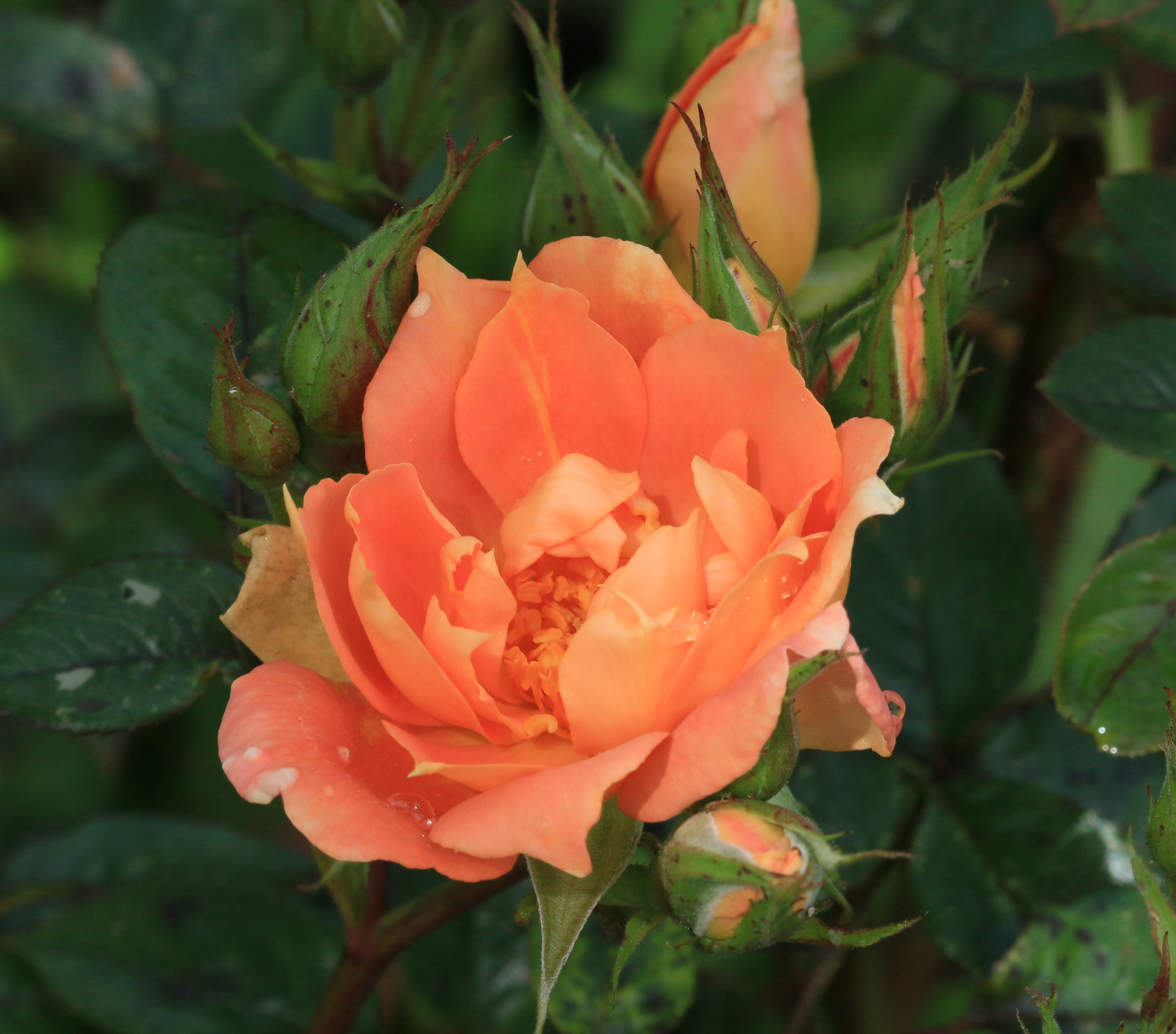
- Rosa 'Bridge of Sighs'
- Genus: Rosa hybrid
- Cultivar group: Climbing rose
- Cultivar: HARglow
- Marketing names: 'HARglow 'HARglowing
- Breeder: Jack Harkness
- Origin: U.K., 2000

Rosa 'Bridge of Sighs' is an apricot climbing rose cultivar, developed by Jack Harkness and introduced into Great Britain by Harkness Roses in 2000.

== History ==
=== Harkness Roses ===
Harkness Roses was established in 1879 in Bedale, Yorkshire by brothers, John Harkness (1857–1933) and Robert Harkness (1851–1920). In 1882, John and Robert began to grow and exhibit roses. Their new rose business was a great success; Queen Victoria purchased her roses from Harkness & Sons in the 1890s. John and Robert soon realized that Yorkshire's climate was too cold for an expanding rose growing business. In 1892, they decided to established a branch of the firm in a location with a warmer climate. Neither brother wanted to leave Yorkshire, so it was decided by a coin toss that Robert would move to Hitchin, Hertfordshire to establish the new branch of Harkness and Sons. In 1901, John and Robert decided to dissolve the company and create two separate nurseries. Robert established R. Harkness & Co, today known as Harknes Roses.

=== Jack Harkness ===
Jack Harkness (1918–1994) is the grandson of the original co-founder John Harkness. He established the first rose hybridization program at the company in 1962, developing vigorous, healthy roses by hybridizing from wild rose species. In the 1970s he began breeding with Rosa persica, an unusual rose species with simple leaves. During his career, Harkness developed many successful rose cultivars, including 'Alexander', 'Mountbatten' and 'Amber Queen'. He is best known for his floribundas and hybrid tea roses. The rose cultivar, 'Bridge of Sighs', was developed by Harkness and introduced into Britain by Harkness Roses in 2000. Harkness named 'Bridge of Sighs' after the Hertford bridge at Oxford, where his brother, Peter Harkness, attended university. The stock parents of 'Bridge of Sighs' are unknown.

== Description ==
'Bridge of Sighs' is a large flowered climbing rose with glossy, medium green foliage. It typically grows up to 10 ft in height (305 cm) and ranges from 3 to 4 ft (91–121 cm) in width. It bears semi-double (9–16 petals) showy flowers in clusters of 3 to 7 flowers. The rose has a strong fruity fragrance. Blooms have an average diameter of 2–3 in (5–7.6 cm). Flower color varies from apricot to an apricot-blend. The climbing rose blooms early in the season. It is a reliable repeat bloomer from summer to autumn. It also has very flexible canes, which makes it easy to train. It is suitable for all soil types.
