= Rosa 'Frensham' =

Red Floribunda rose cultivar

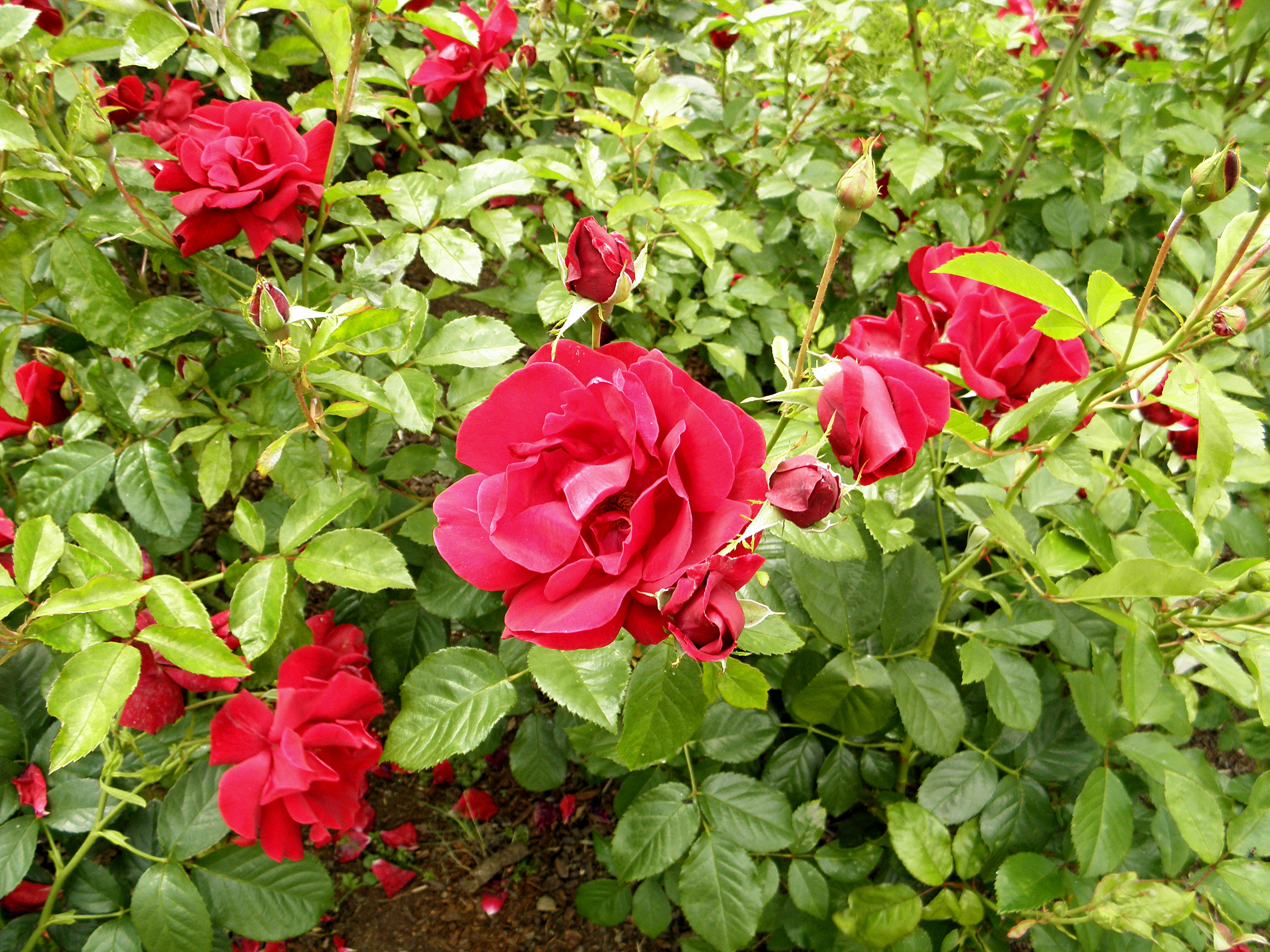
- Rosa 'Frensham'
- Genus: Rosa hybrid
- Cultivar group: Floribunda
- Breeder: Albert Norman
- Origin: Great Britain, 1946

Rosa 'Frensham' is a dark red Floribunda rose cultivar, developed by Albert Norman in 1942 and introduced into Britain by Harkness Roses in 1946 as 'Frensham'. It was awarded the RNRS Gold Medal by the Royal National Rose Society (RNRS) in 1943.

== Description ==
'Frensham' is a medium-sized, vigorous bushy floribunda rose, 4 ft (121 cm) in height, with a 3 ft (91 cm) plant spread. The rose has a medium (9-16 petals) semi-double bloom form with 2–3 in (3-5 cm) flowers, typically borne in clusters. 'Frensham' has a mild fragrance with a bloom color of dark red. The rose blooms in flushes from spring to fall. The foliage is dark green and shiny, and the plant has many thorns and prickles. 'Frensham' is susceptible to mildew.

== History ==
'Frensham' was developed in 1942 by Albert Norman, who was a diamond cutter by profession and an amateur rose breeder. He was a family friend of Bill Harkness of Harkness Roses. Norman is also known for developing the roses 'Ena Harkness', 'Vera Dalton' and 'Anne Elizabeth'. He developed the rose through a combination of Rosa 'Edith Cavell' x (Rosa 'Edgar Andrew' × Rosa 'Crimson Glory'). The new rose cultivar was introduced into Britain as "Frensham' by (Harkness Roses in 1946. The family nursery, which continues to sell roses today, was established in 1879 in Bedale, Yorkshire by brothers, John Harkness (1857-1933) and Robert Harkness (1851-1920). 'Frensham' was used to develop the rose cultivar, Rosa 'Columbine' (Poulsen, 1956). The rose was awarded the RNRS Gold Medal in 1943.
