= List of Award of Garden Merit roses =

The following is a selected list of rose varieties and cultivars which currently (2017) hold the Royal Horticultural Society's Award of Garden Merit.

== List of roses ==
This sortable list allows users to view roses alphabetically by breeder, colour, etc. - as well as ordering them by size if required. Clicking on the double arrow a second time reverses the alphabetical order.

↑ shows the maximum height in metres. ←→ shows the maximum spread in square metres. Notes indicates sources of names where known. Repeat flower indicates whether the variety has a single flush of flowers in summer, or further flushes of flowers through the season.

Cultivar	Breeder	Year bred	AGM awarded	Flower colour	Type	Repeat flower	Scent	↑	←→	Image	Notes
'A Shropshire Lad' = 'Ausled'	Austin	1996	2012	pink (peach)	English	yes	strong	1.5	1.5		(Note: A Shropshire Lad)
A Whiter Shade of Pale = 'Peafanfare'	Pearce	2006	2012	pink (light)	hybrid tea	yes	strong	1.0	1.0		(Note: A Whiter Shade of Pale)
Absolutely Fabulous = 'Wekvossutono'	Carruth	2004	2012	yellow	floribunda	yes	strong	1.0	1.0		(Note: Absolutely Fabulous)
Adélaïde d’Orléans	Jacques	1826	1993	white	climber	no	light	5	4		(Note: Princess Adélaïde of Orléans)
Alba maxima (R. × alba)	-	<1500	2012	white	alba	no	strong	2	2		
Alba Semiplena (R. × alba)	-	<1629	1993	white	alba	no	strong	2.5	1.5		(Note: Alba semiplena = white, semi-double)
Albéric Barbier	Barbier	1900	1993	cream	rambler	no	light	5	4		
Albertine	Barbier	1921	1993	pink (salmon)	rambler	no	strong	5	4		
Alexander = 'Harlex'	Harkness	1972	1993	vermilion	hybrid tea	yes	light	2	1		
Alexandre Girault	Barbier	1907	2012	pink (carmine)	rambler	yes	strong	8	4		
Alibaba	Warner	2006	2012	pink (azalea)	climber	yes	medium	3			(Note: Ali Baba)
Alister Stella Gray	Gray	1894	2012	yellow (light)	noisette	yes	medium	5			
Aloha	Boerner	1949	2002	pink (rose)	climber	yes	medium	4	2.5	|| (Note: Aloha)	
'Amber Queen' = 'Harroony'	Harkness	1984	1993	apricot	floribunda	yes	medium	1	1		
Andrewsii	see R. spinosissima										
Anna Ford = 'Harpiccolo'	Harkness	1980	1993	orange	miniature	yes	none	0.4	0.4		(Note: Anna Ford)
Aphrodite = 'Tan00847'	Tantau	2006	2012	pink	shrub	yes	medium	1	0.5		(Note: Aphrodite)
Apothecary Rose	see R. gallica officinalis										
Arthur Bell	McGredy	1964	1993	yellow (pale)	floribunda	yes	medium	1	1		(Note: Arthur Kinmond Bell)
Ballerina	Bentall	1937	1993	pink-white	hybrid musk	yes	light	1.5	1.5		
R. banksiae 'Lutea'	-	-	1993	yellow	climber	no	light	12	4		
Beau Narcisse	Miellez	<1824	2012	crimson	gallica	no	strong	1.5	1.5		(Note: =Beautiful Narcissus)
Belvedere	Jacques	1829	2012	pink (light)	rambler	no	strong	8			
Berkshire = 'Korpinka'	Kordes	1992	2002	pink	groundcover	yes	none	0.5	1.5		(Note: Berkshire)
Blanche Double de Coubert	Cochet-Cochet	1893	1993	white	rugosa	yes	medium	1.5	1.5		(Note: = double white from Coubert)
Bleu Magenta		1933	1994	purple	rambler	no	light	4	4		
Blue for You = 'Pejamblue'	James	2006	2012	mauve	floribunda	yes	none	1	1		
Blushing Lucy	Williams	1938	2012	pink (light)	rambler	no	strong	5	4		
Bobbie James	Sunningdale	1961	1993	white	rambler	no	strong	8	8		
'Bonica 82' = 'Meidomonac'	Meilland	1982	1993	pink	groundcover	yes	none	1	1		
Bowled Over = 'Tandolgnil'	Tantau	2001	2012	yellow (deep)	floribunda	yes	medium	0.8	0.8		
Britannia = 'Frycalm'	Fryer	1998	2012	salmon-orange	hybrid tea	yes	medium	0.8	0.8		(Note: Britannia)
Buff Beauty'	Bentall	1939	1993	buff	hybrid musk	yes	medium	1.2	1.2		
Buxom Beauty = 'Korbilant'	Kordes	1991	2012	pink	hybrid tea	yes	strong	1.2	1		
Canary Bird	see R. xanthina 'Canary Bird'										
Cantabrigiensis	Hurst	~1922	1994	yellow (pale)	shrub	yes	light	2.5	2.5		(Note: Cantabrigiensis)
Carefree Days = 'Meirivoui'	Meilland		2012	pink	patio	yes	light	0.5			
Cécile Brünner	Ducher	1880	1994	pink (pale)	polyantha	yes	medium	1	1		
Cécile Brünner	see also Climbing Cécile Brünner										
Célèste	-	<1740	1993	pink (pale)	alba	no	medium	1.5	1.5		
Celsiana	-	<1732	2012	pink (light)	damask	no	strong	1.5	1.5		
R. × centifolia 'Cristata'	Kirche	1827	1993	pink	centifolia	no	strong	1.5	1.5		
Centre Stage = 'Chewcreepy'	Warner	2000	2012	pink (light)	shrub	light	0.5	1	1		
Cerise Bouquet	Tantau	1937	1993	pink	shrub	no	medium	4	4		
Champagne Moment = 'Korvanaber'	Kordes	1999	2012	cream	floribunda	yes	light	1.2	1.2		
Chandos Beauty = 'Harmisty'	Harkness	2005	2012	cream-apricot	hybrid tea	yes	strong	1.2	1		
Charles de Mills	-	<1790	1993	purple	gallica	no	strong	1.5	1.5		
Charlie’s Rose = 'Tanellepa'	Tantau	1994	2012	pink	hybrid tea	yes	strong	1.5	1.2		
Charlotte = 'Auspoly'	Austin	1994	2002	yellow (pale)	shrub	yes	medium	1	1		
Chinatown	Poulsen	1962	1993	yellow-pink	floribunda	yes	strong	1	1		(Note: Chinatown)
Claret = 'Frykristal'	Fryer	2005	2012	crimson	hybrid tea	yes	medium	1	0.8		
Climbing 'Cécile Brünner'	Ardagh	1904	1993	pink (pale)	climber	yes	medium	4	4		
Climbing Étoile de Hollande	Leenders	1931	1993	red	climber	yes	strong	6			
Climbing Iceberg	Cant	1968	1993	white	climber	yes	medium	4	4		
Climbing Lady Hillingdon	Hicks	1917	1993	yellow	climber	yes	medium	4	2.5		
Climbing Madame Butterfly	Smith	1926	2012	pink (light)	climber	yes	medium	5.5			(Note: Madama Butterfly)
'Compassion'	Harkness	1972	1993	apricot-pink	climber	yes	medium	3	2.5		
'Constance Spry'	Austin	1961	1993	pink	climber	no	strong	3	3		(Note: Constance Spry)
Cornelia	Pemberton	1925	1993	apricot-pink	hybrid musk	yes	strong	1.5	1.5		
County of Yorkshire = 'Korstarnow'	Kordes	<2002	2012	white	floribunda	yes	medium	0.5	0.5		(Note: Yorkshire)
Crazy for You = 'Wekroalt'	Weeks	1999	2012	red-white stripes	floribunda	yes	medium	1.1	1		
Crimson Cascade = 'Fryclimbdown'	Fryer	<1990	2012	red (dark)	climber	yes	light	2.5	1.8		
Crocus Rose = 'Ausquest'	Austin	2000	2012	cream	English	yes	light	1.2	1		
Daisy Hill	Smith	~1900	2012	pink (light)	hybrid macrantha	no	strong	2.5	1.5		
R. × damascena var. semperflorens		<1633	2012	pink	damask	yes	strong	1.5	1.2		(Note: Semperflorens = "repeat flowering")
Dancing Queen = 'Fryfestoon'	Fryer	2004	2012	pink	climber, ht	yes	light	2.5	2		(Note: Dancing Queen)
Darcey Bussell = 'Ausdecorum'	Austin	2005	2012	red	shrub	yes	medium	1	1		(Note: Darcey Bussell)
Dawn Chorus = 'Dicquasar'	Dickson	1991	2002	orange	hybrid tea	yes	light	0.8	0.8		(Note: Dawn chorus (birds))
De Resht	-	<1900	1993	purple-crimson	Portland	yes	medium	1	1		
Debutante	Walsh	1901	2012	pink (light)	rambler		strong	3	0.6		
Diamond	Kordes	1992	2012	white	patio	yes	none	0.6	0.4		
Dizzy Heights = 'Fryblissful'	Fryer	1999	2012	red	climber	yes	strong	3			
Dortmund	Kordes	1955	2002	red	shrub	yes	none	2.5	1.8		(Note: Dortmund)
Dublin Bay = 'Macdub'	McGredy	1975	1993	red	climber	yes	light	2.5	1.8		(Note: Dublin Bay)
Duc de Guiche		<1810	1993	purple-crimson	gallica	no	strong	1.5	1.5		(Note: Guiche, Pyrénées-Atlantiques)
Duchess of Cornwall = 'Tan97159'	Tantau	2005	2012	orange-pink	hybrid tea		strong	0.75	0.75		(Note: Duchess of Cornwall)
Duchesse de Montebello	Laffay	1824	1993	pink (pale)	gallica	no	medium	1.5	1		(Note: Duchess of Montebello)
Dupontii (snowbush rose)	Dupont	1817	2012	white-yellow	shrub	medium	no	2	2		
Easlea's Golden Rambler	Easlea	1932	2002	yellow	rambler	no	medium	8	4		
'Easy Does It' = 'Harpageant'	Harkness	2006	2012	orange-pink	floribunda	yes	light	0.9	0.7		
Easy Going = 'Harflow'	Harkness	1996	2012	yellow (apricot)	floribunda	yes	medium	0.9	0.9		
'Elina' = 'Dicjana'	Dickson	1984	1993	yellow (pale)	hybrid tea	yes	light	1	1		
Escapade = 'Harpade'	Harkness	1967	1994	mauve	floribunda	yes	strong	1.2	1.2		
Especially for You = 'Fryworthy'	Fryer	1996	2012	yellow	hybrid tea	yes	medium	1	1		
Étoile de Hollande	see Climbing Étoile de Hollande										
Eyes for You = 'Pejbigeye'	James	2008	2012	lilac	hybrid tea	yes	medium	0.9	0.9		
Fantin-Latour	-	~1900	1993	pink (pale)	centifolia	no	medium	1.5	1.5		(Note: Henri Fantin-Latour)
Fascination = 'Poulmax'	Poulsen	1989	2002	pink (pale)	floribunda	yes	light	1	1		
Felicia	Pemberton	1926	1993	pink	hybrid musk	yes	medium	1.5	2.5		
Félicité Parmentier	Parmentier	1836	1993	pink (pale)	alba × damask	no	medium	1.5	1.5		
Félicité et Perpétue	Jacques	1827	1993	white	rambler	no	medium	8	4		(Note: Félicité et Perpétue)
Fellowship = 'Harwelcome'	Harkness	1992	2002	orange	floribunda	yes	medium	1	1		
Ferdinand Pichard	Tanne	1921	1993	pink-white stripe	bourbon	yes	medium	1.5	1.5		
R. filipes 'Kiftsgate'		1954	1993	white	rambler	no	medium	12	8		(Note: Kiftsgate)
Flower Carpet Amber = 'Noa97400a'	Noack	2005	2012	apricot	groundcover	yes	no	1	1		
Flower Carpet Coral	Noack	2001	2012	red (coral)	groundcover	yes	light	1	1		
Flower Carpet Gold = 'Noalesa'	Noack	2001	2012	yellow	groundcover	yes	no	1	1		
Flower Carpet Red Velvet = 'Noare'	Noack	1998	2012	red	groundcover	yes	no	1	1		
Flower Carpet Scarlet = 'Noa83100b'	Noack	2000	2012	red	groundcover	yes	no	1	1		
Flower Carpet Sunshine = 'Noason'	Noack	1990	2012	yellow	groundcover	yes	light	1	1		
Flower Carpet White = 'Noaschnee'	Noack	1991	2012	white	groundcover	yes	no	1	1		
Flower Power = 'Frycassia'	Fryer	1998	2012	salmon-orange	mini-patio	yes	medium	0.5	0.5		(Note: Flower power)
Fragrant Delight	Tysterman	1978	1996	orange-pink	floribunda	yes	strong	1	1		
Frances E. Lester	Lester	1946	1994	white-pink	rambler	no	medium	8	4		
François Juranville	Barbier	1906	1993	pink (pale)	rambler	no	light	8	4		
Fred Loads	Holmes	1968	1993	orange-red	floribunda	yes	strong	2	1.5		
Free Spirit = 'Fryjeru'	Fryer	2006	2012	salmon-pink	floribunda	yes	no	0.75	0.75		
Freedom = 'Dicjem'	Dickson	1984	1993	yellow	hybrid tea	yes	strong	0.75	0.75		
Friend for Life = 'Cocnanne'	Cocker	1993	2002	pink	floribunda	yes	light	0.75	0.75		
Friends Forever = 'Korapriber'	Kordes	2006	2012	pink (light)	floribunda	yes	medium	0.75	0.75		
Fritz Nobis	Kordes	1940	1993	pink (rose)	floribunda	no	light	2.5	1.5		
Fru Dagmar Hastrup	Hastrup	1914	1993	pink	rugosa	yes	medium	1	1.5		
Frühlingsgold	Kordes	1937	1993	yellow (pale)	hybrid spinosissima	no	strong	2.5	2.5		(Note: Frühlingsgold = "Spring gold")
Frühlingsmorgen	Kordes	1942	2012	pink	hybrid spinosissima	no	medium	2	1.5		(Note: Frühlingsmorgen = "Spring morning")
R. gallica var. officinalis (apothecary's rose)	-	-	1993	pink	gallica	no	medium	1	1		(Note: Apothecary)
R. gallica 'Versicolor' (rosa mundi)	-	<1581	1993	pink-white stripe	gallica	no	medium	1	1		
Gardeners' Glory	Warner	2005	2012	yellow	climber	yes	medium	3	3		
Général Kléber	Robert	1856	2012	pink (light)	moss	no	strong	1.2	1.2		
George Best = 'Dichimanher'	Dickson	2007	2012	red (deep)	miniature	yes	none	0.6	0.5		(Note: George Best)
Geranium (moyesii hybrid)	-	1938	1993	scarlet	moyesii	no	no	2.5	1.5		
Gertrude Jekyll = 'Ausbord'	Austin	1986	1994	pink	English	yes	strong	1.5	1		(Note: Gertrude Jekyll)
Ghislaine de Féligonde	Turbat	1916	2012	apricot	hybrid multiflora	yes	medium	4	2		
R. glauca	-	-	1993	pink	shrub	yes	medium	2.5	2,5		
Gloire de France	Hardy	1836	2012	pink	gallica	no	medium	1	1		
Golden Beauty	Kordes	2001	2012	yellow	floribunda	yes	no	0.8	0.8		
Golden Celebration = 'Ausgold'	Austin	1992	2002	yellow	English	yes	medium	1.5	1		
Golden Future = 'Horanymoll'	Horner	1997	2012	yellow	climber		strong	5	2		
Golden Gate = 'Korgolgat'	Kordes	1995	2012	yellow	climber	yes	medium	4	2		
Golden Memories = 'Korholesea'	Kordes	2002	2012	yellow	floribunda	yes	light	0.9	0.9		
Golden Smiles = 'Frykeyno'	Fryer	2006	2012	yellow	floribunda	yes		1	1		
Gordon's College = 'Cocjabby'	Cocker	1993	2002	pink (salmon)	floribunda	yes	strong	1	1		
Grace = 'Auskeppy'	Austin	2001	2012	apricot	English	yes	strong	1	1		
Graham Thomas = 'Ausmas'	Austin	1983	1993	yellow	English	yes	medium	1.5	1.5		(Note: Graham Thomas)
Grande Amore = 'Korliegra'	Kordes	1995	2012	red (deep)	hybrid tea	yes	light	1	0.8		
Great Maiden's Blush	-	1400	2012	white	alba	no	strong	2	1.5		
Grouse 2000 = 'Korteilhab'	Kordes	1998	2012	pink (light)	miniature	yes	strong	0.6	0.8		
Gruss an Aachen	Geduldig	1909	2012	pink (light)	polyantha	yes	light	0.5	0.5		(Note: =Greetings to Aachen)
Happy Retirement = 'Tantoras'	Tantau	2000	2012	pink (light)	floribunda	yes	light	2	1.2		
Heart of Gold = 'Coctarlotte'	Cocker	2001	2012	apricot	hybrid tea	yes	medium	0.75	0.5		
Henri Martin	Laffay	1862	2012	magenta	moss	no	strong	2	1.5		
Hertfordshire = 'Kortenay'	Kordes	1991	2002	pink	shrub	no	light	0.45	1		(Note: Hertfordshire)
Home Run = 'Wekcisbako'	Carruth	2001	2012	red	shrub	yes	light	1.2	1		(Note: Home run)
Honorine de Brabant	Tanne	1916	2012	pink (light)	bourbon	yes	strong	2	1.2		
'Hot Cocoa' = 'Wekpaltlez'	Carruth	2002	2012	russet	floribunda	yes	medium	0.9	0.9		
Ice Cream = 'Korzuri'	Kordes	1992	2002	white	hybrid tea	yes	medium	1	0.8		
Iceberg = 'Kordes'	Kordes	1958	1993	white	floribunda	yes	medium	1	1		
Iceberg	see also Climbing Iceberg										
Impératrice Joséphine	Descemet	1815	1993	pink	gallica	no	strong	1.5	1		(Note: Joséphine de Beauharnais)
Indian Summer = 'Peaperfume'	Pearce	1991	1996	orange (light)	hybrid tea	yes	strong	1	1		(Note: Indian summer)
Ingrid Bergman = 'Poulman'	Poulsen	1984	1993	red (dark)	hybrid tea	yes	medium	1	1		(Note: Ingrid Bergman)
Irish Eyes = 'Dicwitness'	Dickson	1999	2012	red-yellow	floribunda	yes	light	1	1		(Note: When Irish Eyes Are Smiling)
Isn't She Lovely = 'Diciluvit'	Dickson	2007	2012	cream	hybrid tea	yes	medium	0.8	0.6		(Note: Isn't She Lovely)
Ispahan	-	1827	1993	pink	damask	no	strong	2.5	2		(Note: Isfahan)
Jacqueline du Pré = 'Harwanna'	Harkness	1988	1994	white	shrub	yes	strong	1.1	0.9		(Note: Jacqueline du Pré)
Joie de Vivre = 'Korfloci 01'	Kordes	2006	2012	pink (light)	shrub	yes	light	1	1		(Note: Joie de vivre)
'Just Joey'	Cants	1972	1993	pink (copper)	hybrid tea	no	medium	1	1		
Keep Smiling = 'Fryflorida'	Fryer	2004	2012	yellow	hybrid tea	yes	medium	1	1		
Kent = 'Poulcov'	Poulsen	1985	2002	white	shrub	yes	medium	0.75	1.2		(Note: Kent)
Kew Gardens = 'Ausfence'	Austin	2008	2012	white-yellow	shrub	yes	medium	2.5	1		(Note: Kew Gardens)
Kiftsgate	see R. filipes										
King's Macc = 'Frydisco'	Fryer	2002	2012	apricot	hybrid tea	yes	strong	1	1		
Königin von Dänemark	Booth	1816	1993	pink	alba		strong	1.5	1		(Note: =Queen of Denmark)
Korresia	Kordes	1973	2012	yellow	floribunda	yes	strong	0.75	0.75		
La Rose de Molinard = 'Delgrarose'	Delbard	2007	2012	pink	shrub		strong	1.4	1		
La Ville de Bruxelles	Vibert	1837	1993	pink	damask	no	strong	1.5	1		(Note: City of Brussels)
'Lady Emma Hamilton' = 'Ausbrother'	Austin	2005	2012	orange	English	yes	strong	1.5	1		(Note: Emma, Lady Hamilton)
Lady Hillingdon	see Climbing Lady Hillingdon										
Lady of Shalott = 'Ausnyson'	Austin	2009	2012	apricot	English	yes	light	1.5	1		(Note: The Lady of Shalott)
L'Aimant = 'Harzola'	Harkness	1994	2002	pink (salmon)	floribunda	yes	medium	1	1		(Note: = The Lover)
Lancashire = 'Korstesgli'	Kordes	1991	2002	red (dark)	groundcover	yes	none	0.5	1		(Note: Lancashire)
Laura Ford = 'Chewarvel'	Warner	1989	1993	yellow	climber	yes	light	3			
Lawinia = 'Tanklewi'	Tantau	1980	1996	pink	climber	no	strong	3			
Leaping Salmon = 'Peamight'	Pearce	1983	2012	orange-pink	climber	yes	strong	4.5			
Leverkusen	Kordes	1954	2002	yellow (light)	climber	yes	light	3	2.5		(Note: Leverkusen)
'Lichfield Angel'= 'Ausrelate'	Austin	2006	2012	cream-apricot	English	yes	light	1.2	1.2		(Note: Lichfield)
Light Fantastic = 'Dicgottago'	Dickson	2006	2012	white	floribunda	yes	light	0.9	0.9		
Little Rambler = 'Chewramb'	Warner	1994	2002	pink (light)	miniature, cl.	yes	strong	2.5	2.5		
Love & Peace = 'BAIpeace'	Lim & Twomey	1991	2012	yellow-red	hybrid tea	yes	medium	2	1.5		
Love Knot = 'Chewglorious'	Warner	1999	2012	red	mini climber	yes	light	1.8			(Note: Love knot)
Lovely Lady = 'Dicjubell'	Dickson	1983	1993	salmon	hybrid tea	yes	medium	1	1		
Lucky = 'Frylucy'	Fryer	2005	2012	pink (lilac)	floribunda	yes	medium	0.95	1		
Madame Alfred Carrière	Schwartz	1875	1993	white	noisette	yes	strong	8	2.5		
Madame Butterfly	see Climbing Madame Butterfly										
Madame Grégoire Staechelin	Dot	1927	1993	pink	climber	no	medium	8	4		
Madame Hardy	Hardy	1831	1993	white	damask	no	medium	1.5	1.5		
Madame Knorr	Verdier	1855	1993	pink	Portland	yes	strong	1.5	1		
Magic Carpet = 'Jaclover'	Jackson & Perkins	1993	2002	mauve blend	groundcover	yes	light	0.75	1.2		(Note: Magic carpet)
Maigold	Kordes	1953	1993	yellow	climber	yes	medium	2.5	2.5		
Mermaid	Paul	1878	1993	yellow	climber	yes	medium	8	4		
Molineux = 'Ausmol'	Austin	1994	2002	yellow	English	yes	medium	1	1		(Note: Molineux Stadium)
Moment in Time = 'Korcastrav'	Kordes		2012	red	floribunda	yes	light	0.6	0.5		
Mortimer Sackler = 'Ausorts'	Austin	2002	2012	pink (pale)	English	yes	strong	1.5	1		(Note: Mortimer Sackler)
R. mundi	see R. gallica versicolor										
Munstead Wood = 'Ausbernard'	Austin	2007	2012	crimson-purple	English	yes	strong	1	1		(Note: Munstead Wood)
Mutabilis	see R. × odorata										
'New Dawn'	Dreer	1930	1993	pink (pale)	climber	yes	medium	2.5	2.5		
Nuits de Young	Laffay	1845	2002	maroon-purple	moss	no	medium	1.5	1		
R. × odorata 'Mutabilis'		1860		yellow-pink	china	yes	none	1.5	1.5		
Paul's Himalayan musk	Paul	1886	1993	pink (pale)	rambler	no	strong	12	9		
Penelope	Pemberton	1924	1993	cream-pink	hybrid musk	yes	strong	2	2		
Penny Lane = 'Hardwell'	Harkness	1998	2002	pink (flesh)	climber	yes	medium	3	2		(Note: Penny Lane)
Perle d'Or	Rambaub	1843	1993	apricot (pale)	shrub	yes	strong	1	1		(Note: =Golden pearl)
Princess of Wales = 'Hardinkum'	Harkness	1997	2002	white	floribunda		strong				(Note: Princess of Wales)
Rambling Rector		1899	1993	white	rambler	no	strong	8	4		
Rambling Rosie = 'Horjasper'	Horner	2005	2012	red	rambler	yes	light	4	1.5		
Rhapsody in Blue = 'Frantasia'	Cowlishaw	2003	2012	purple/blue	shrub	yes	strong	1.5	1		(Note: Rhapsody in Blue)
Roseraie de l'Haÿ	Cochet	1861		purple	rugosa	yes	medium	2.5	2.5		(Note: L'Haÿ-les-Roses)
Simply the Best = 'Macamster'	McGredy	1998	2012	apricot	hybrid tea	yes	strong	1	1		(Note: The Best (song))
R. spinosissima 'Andrewsii'		1899	1993	pink-white	shrub	no	light	1	1.5		
R. pimpinellifolia 'Stanwell Perpetual'			2012	pink (pale)	shrub	yes	medium	1.0	1.5		
Summertime = 'Meipiokou'	Warner	2003	2012	yellow (light)	patio, climber	yes	light	4			
Sweet Haze = 'Tan97274'	Tantau	1997	2012	pink (pale)	floribunda	yes	medium	0.8	0.5		
Tequila Sunrise = 'Dicobey'				yellow/red	hybrid tea	yes	none	0.75	0.75		
The Fairy	Bentall	1932	1993	pink	polyantha	yes	none	1	1		
The Trumpeter = 'Mactru'	McGredy	1977	1993	orange-red	floribunda	yes	light	1	1.5		
Tuscany Superb		1837		purple (deep)	gallica	no	light	1	1		
Valentine Heart = 'Dicogle'	Dickson	1985	2002	pink (pale)	floribunda	yes	medium	0.6	0.6		
Veilchenblau	Schmidt	1869	1993	violet-lilac	rambler	no	light	8	2		(Note: =violet blue)
R. virginiana			1993	pink (pale)	species	no	no	1.5	1.5		
Warm Wishes = 'Fryxotic'	Fryer	1996	2002	orange	hybrid tea	no	strong	0.75	0.75		
White Pet		1879	1993	white	polyantha	yes	light	0.5	0.5		
Wild Edric = 'Aushedge'	Austin	2005	2012	pink (deep)	English	yes	strong	1.5	1.5		(Note: Eadric the Wild)
Wild Rover = 'Dichirap'	Dickson	2007	2012	purple-yellow	floribunda	yes	medium	1.2	1.2		(Note: Wild Rover)
Wild Thing = 'Jactoose'	Zary	2007	2012	purple-red	shrub	yes	none	1	1		(Note: Wild Thing)
William Lobb	Laffay	1855	1993	purple-pink	shrub	yes	strong	2	2		(Note: William Lobb)
Wiltshire = 'Kormuse'	Kordes	1993	2002	pink (rose)	groundcover	yes	light	0.5	1		(Note: Wiltshire)
Worcestershire = 'Korlalon'	Kordes	1999	2012	yellow	groundcover	yes	none	1.2	1.5		(Note: Worcestershire)
R. xanthina 'Canary Bird'		1867	1993	yellow	shrub	no	none	2.5	4		
You Are My Sunshine = 'Frykwango'	Fryer	2007	2012	yellow	hybrid tea	yes		1	1		(Note: You Are My Sunshine)

== Withdrawn AGM-Roses ==
Variety	Breeder	Year bred	AGM awarded	Flower colour	Type	Repeat flower	Scent	Dimensions	Image	Ref
Arthur Bell, Cl.	Pearce	1978	2001	yellow	climber	yes	strong			
Belle de Crécy	Roeser	1836	1993	mauve	gallica	no	strong			
Canary Bird	-	<1945		yellow	shrub	yes	slight	10.0m²		
Cardinal de Richelieu	Parmentier	<1847	1993	purple	gallica	no	strong	1.0m²		
City of London	Harkness	1986	1993	white	floribunda	yes	strong			
Comte de Chambord	Robert and Moreau	<1858	1993	rose	Portland	yes	strong			
Golden Showers	Lammerts	1950	2002	yellow	climber	yes	medium	10.0m²		
Madame Isaac Pereire	Garçon	1881	2002	pink	climber	no	strong	6.5m²		
Margaret Merril				white	floribunda	yes	strong	1m²		
Mary Rose	Austin	1983		pink (rose)	English	yes	medium	1.2m²		
Nevada	Pedro Dot	1927	1993	white	shrub	yes	slight			
R. rugosa 'Alba'				white	rugosa	yes	medium	6.5m²		

== See also ==
- Rose (main encyclopedia entry on roses)
- Garden roses
- ADR rose
- List of rose breeders
- List of rose cultivars named after people
- Rose Hall of Fame
