= Rosa 'Belmonte' =

Floribunda rose cultivar

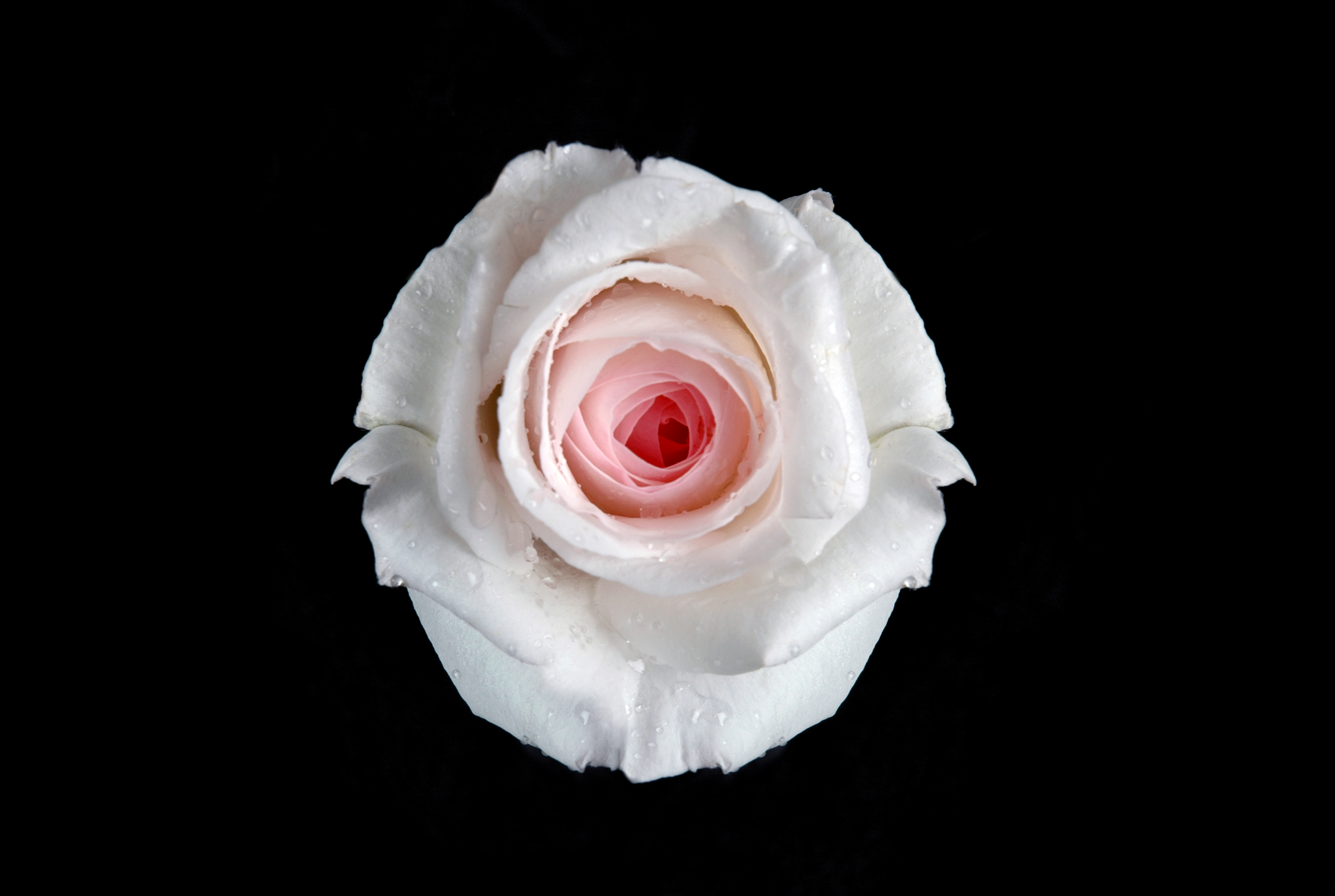
- Rosa 'Belmonte'
- Genus: Rosa
- Hybrid parentage: 'Dr. Darley' x 'Pretty Lady'
- Cultivar group: Floribunda
- Cultivar: HARpearl
- Marketing names: 'Belmonte', 'Butterfly Kisses', 'Sheridan's Anniversary Blush'
- Breeder: Harkness Roses
- Origin: Great Britain, 2007

Rosa 'Belmonte' (AKA 'HARpearl') is a light pink floribunda rose, created by Harkness Roses of Hitchin, Hertfordshire and introduced in Great Britain in 2007.

== History ==
Harkness Roses was established in 1879 in Bedale, Yorkshire by brothers, John Harkness (1857–1933) and Robert Harkness (1851–1920). In 1882, John and Robert began to grow and exhibit roses. In 1892, they decided to established a branch of the firm in a location with a warmer climate. Neither brother wanted to leave Yorkshire, so it was decided by a coin toss that Robert would move to Hitchin, Hertfordshire to establish the new branch of Harkness and Sons. In 1901, John and Robert decided to dissolve the company and create two separate nurseries. Robert established R. Harkness & Co, today known as Harknes Roses.

The stock parents of Rosa 'Belmonte' are floribunda, Rosa 'Dr. Darley' and hybrid tea, Rosa 'Pretty Lady'. The new cultivar was introduced in Great Britain by Harkness Roses in 2007 as 'Rosa Belmonte'. It was also introduced in Canada by Sheridan Nurseries Ltd. in 2013 as 'Sheridan's Anniversary Blush' and introduced in Australia by Knight's Roses in 2017 as 'Butterfly Kisses'.

== Description ==
'Belmonte' is a medium bushy shrub, up to 3–4 ft (90–120 cm) in height, with a spread of 2–3 ft (60–90 cm). Blooms are double, cupped in form, 2—3 in (5–7.6 cm) in diameter, with 26 to 40 petals. The rose has a fruity, citrusy fragrance. The petals are light pink in color. Flowers appear in clusters of three to seven flowers throughout the season. 'Belmonte' has a moderately fruity fragrance with citrus undertones. The plant is very disease-tolerant, and can grow without regular fungicide spraying. It has medium green, glossy foliage.

== Awards ==
Rosa 'Belmonte' was a Gold Standard Award Winner in 2009. The Gold Standard is a rose award granted in the Gold Standard Trials, conducted by the British Association of Rose Breeders (BARB) and the National Institute of Agricultural Botany (NIAB).
