= Rosa 'Cherish' =

Rose cultivar

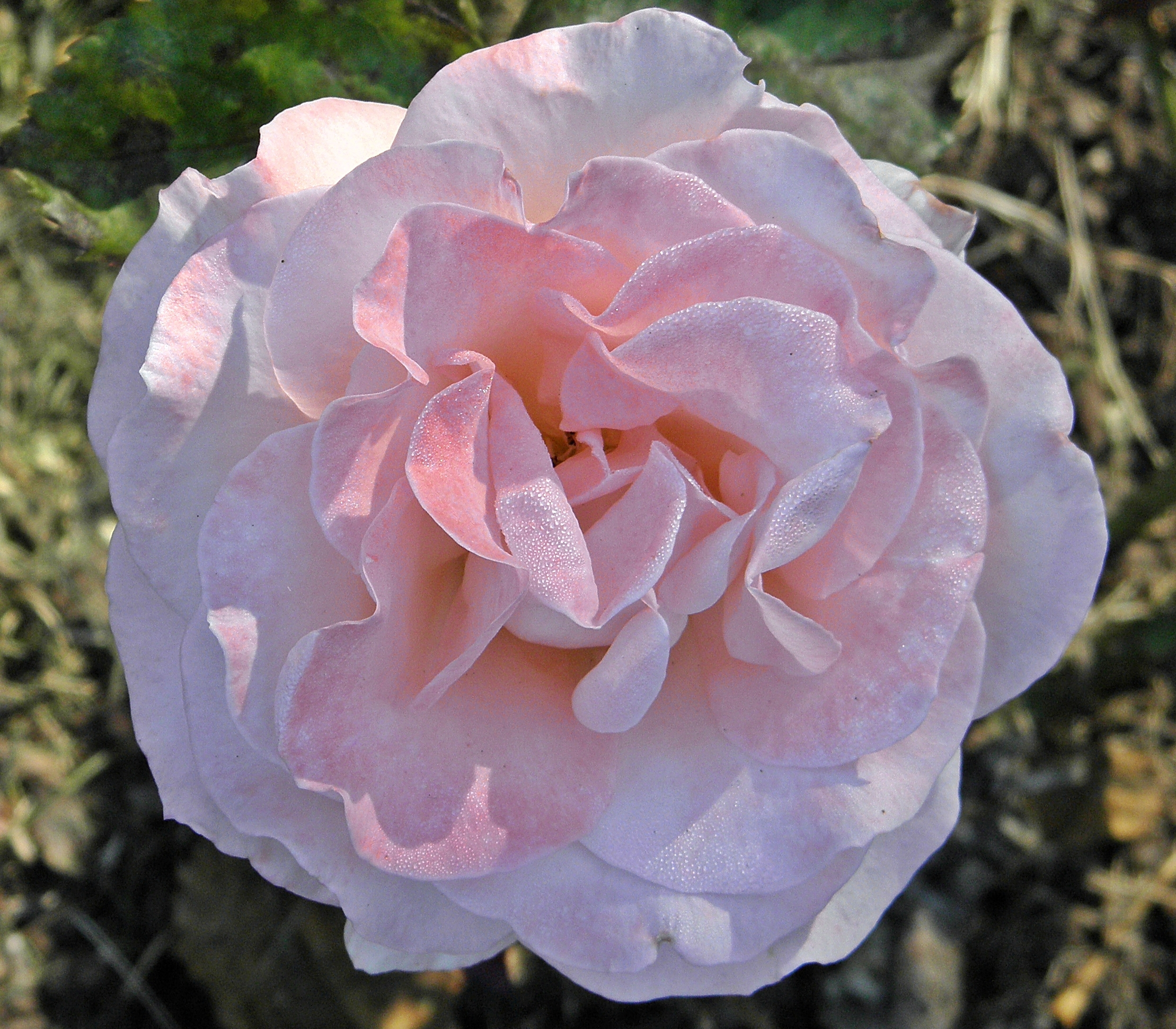
- Rosa 'Cherish'
- Genus: Rosa hybrid
- Hybrid parentage: 'Bridal Pink' x 'Matador'
- Cultivar group: Floribunda
- Cultivar: JACsal
- Marketing names: 'Cherish', 'JACsal'
- Breeder: Warriner
- Origin: United States, 1980

Rosa 'Cherish', (a.k.a. JACsal), is an orange-pink floribunda rose cultivar. Bred by William Warriner in the United States before 1977 and introduced by Jackson & Perkins in 1980, the rose was named an All-America Rose Selections, also in 1980. The stock parents are the floribunda roses, 'Bridal Pink' and 'Matador'.

== Description ==
'Cherish' is a medium bushy shrub, 3 to 4 ft (90-120 cm) in height with a 2 to 3ft (60-90 cm) spread. Blooms are 2-3 in (5-7 cm) in diameter, with 16-25 petals. Flowers have a mild scent, and have a high-centered, double bloom form. The flowers are borne singly or in small clusters. Buds are reddish-orange The flowers open initially as a coral pink and then turn to a light pink with a salmon center. The rose has a strong, spice fragrance. Leaves are large and dark green, and susceptible to blackspot. The plant thrives in USDA zone 6 and warmer and blooms in flushes from spring to fall.

== Awards ==
- All-America Rose Selections winner, USA, (1980)

== See also ==
- Garden roses
- Rose Hall of Fame
- List of Award of Garden Merit roses
