= Angel Face =

Angel Face may refer to:

== Arts ==
- Angel Face (1953 film), a black-and-white film noir directed by Otto Preminger
- Angel Face (1998 film), an Argentine film written and directed by Pablo Torre
- Angel Face (2018 film), French film
- Angel Face, a 1919 Broadway musical by Victor Herbert
- Angel Face, a 2000 EP by Eric Sardinas
- Angel Face, a character in the 1996 novel Fight Club and its 1999 film adaptation
- "Angel Face", 216th episode of Adventure Time
- "Angel Face", a 1974 single by The Glitter Band

== Other uses ==
- Rosa 'Angel Face', a type of rose
- Angel Face (cocktail), made from gin, apricot brandy and calvados
