= Rosa 'Duke of Edinburgh' =

Rose cultivar named for Prince Philip

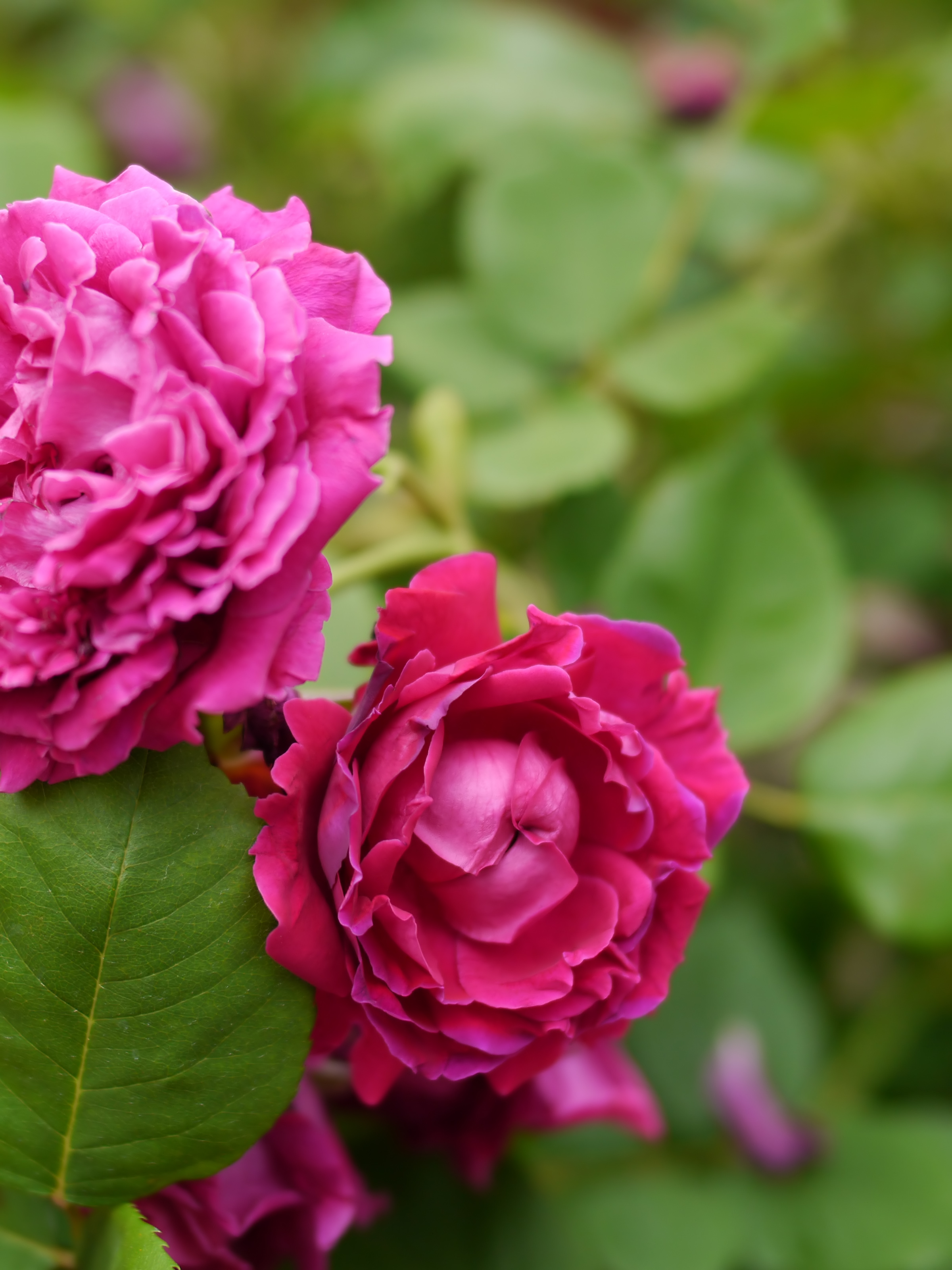
- Cultivar group: Hybrid Perpetual
- Cultivar: Duke of Edinburgh

Rosa 'Duke of Edinburgh' is a rose created by breeders Harkness Roses. It was named in memory of Prince Philip, Duke of Edinburgh, the longest serving consort in British history.

== Background ==
The rose was given to Queen Elizabeth II to celebrate and commemorate what would have been Prince Philip's 100th birthday in 2021. Any purchases of the Rose would donate £2.50 to charity.

== Description ==
It is described as "an elegant hybrid" that has a dark red color consisting of a full round bloom atop light green leaves. It is known to emit moderate amounts of fragrance. The Royal Horticultural Society says "Large clusters of sweetly scented, semi-double bright scarlet to crimson-red flowers with white flecks appear on long stems blooming continuously from June through to September".
