= Rosa 'Princess of Wales' =

Floribunda rose cultivar

Rosa Princess of Wales
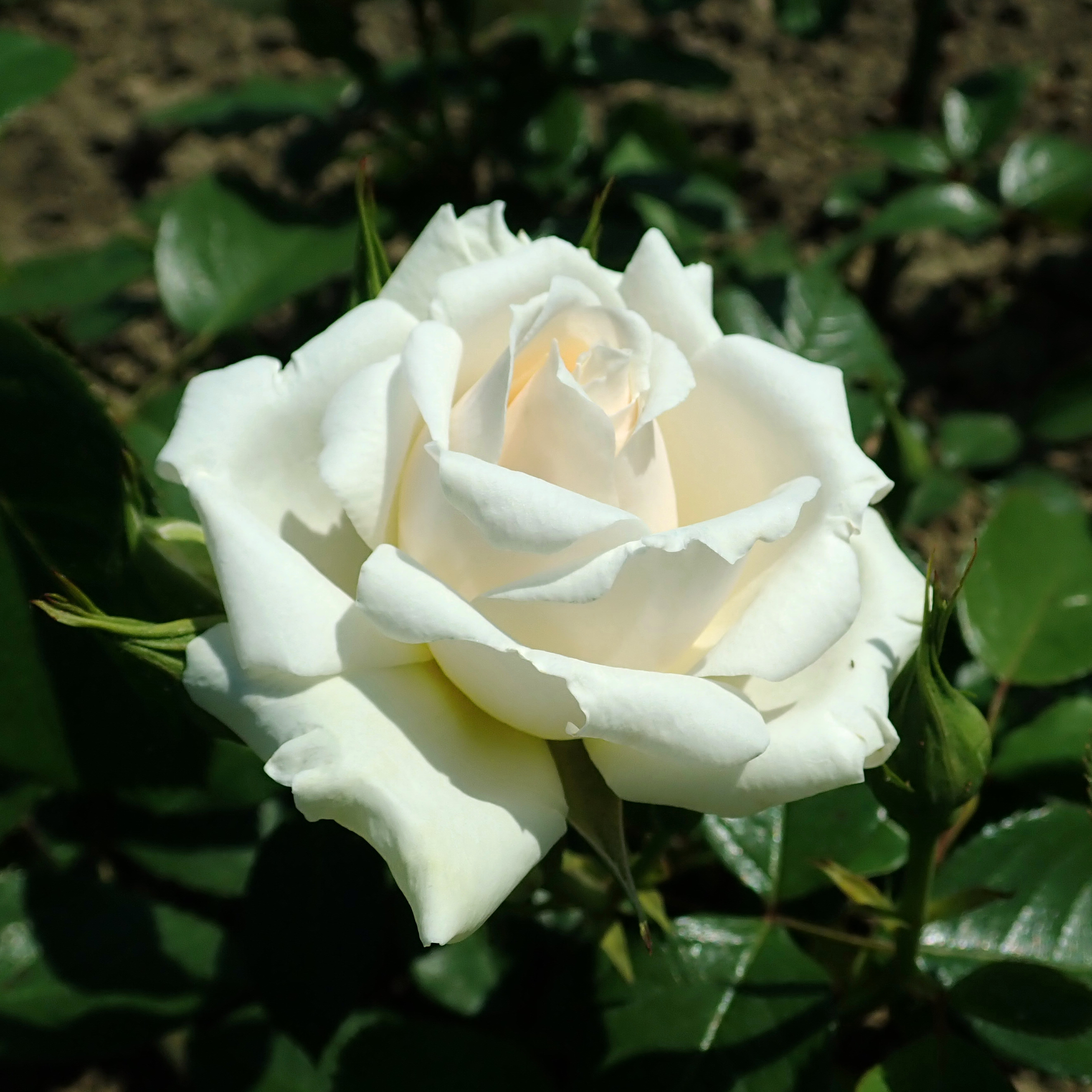
- Cultivar group: Floribunda
- Cultivar: 'Princess of Wales'
- Marketing names: 'Hardinkum'
- Origin: Harkness (UK 1997)

Rosa 'Princess of Wales' is a white blend Floribunda rose cultivar. It was bred by Harkness in the United Kingdom and introduced in 1997.

== Naming ==
The name 'Princess of Wales' was chosen in honour of Diana, Princess of Wales. She received it as a tribute for her 10-year cooperation with the British Lung Foundation. The rose is said to be one of Diana's favourites. After her death, the proceeds from selling the roses in 1998–99 were donated to the British Lung Foundation.

== Description ==
The nostalgic floribunda is also known as 'Hardinkum'. It has a double bloom form, and a mild to strong fragrance.

== Awards ==
In 2002, it was granted the Award of Garden Merit by the Royal Horticultural Society.
