= Rosa 'Alexander' =

Orange-red Hybrid tea rose cultivar

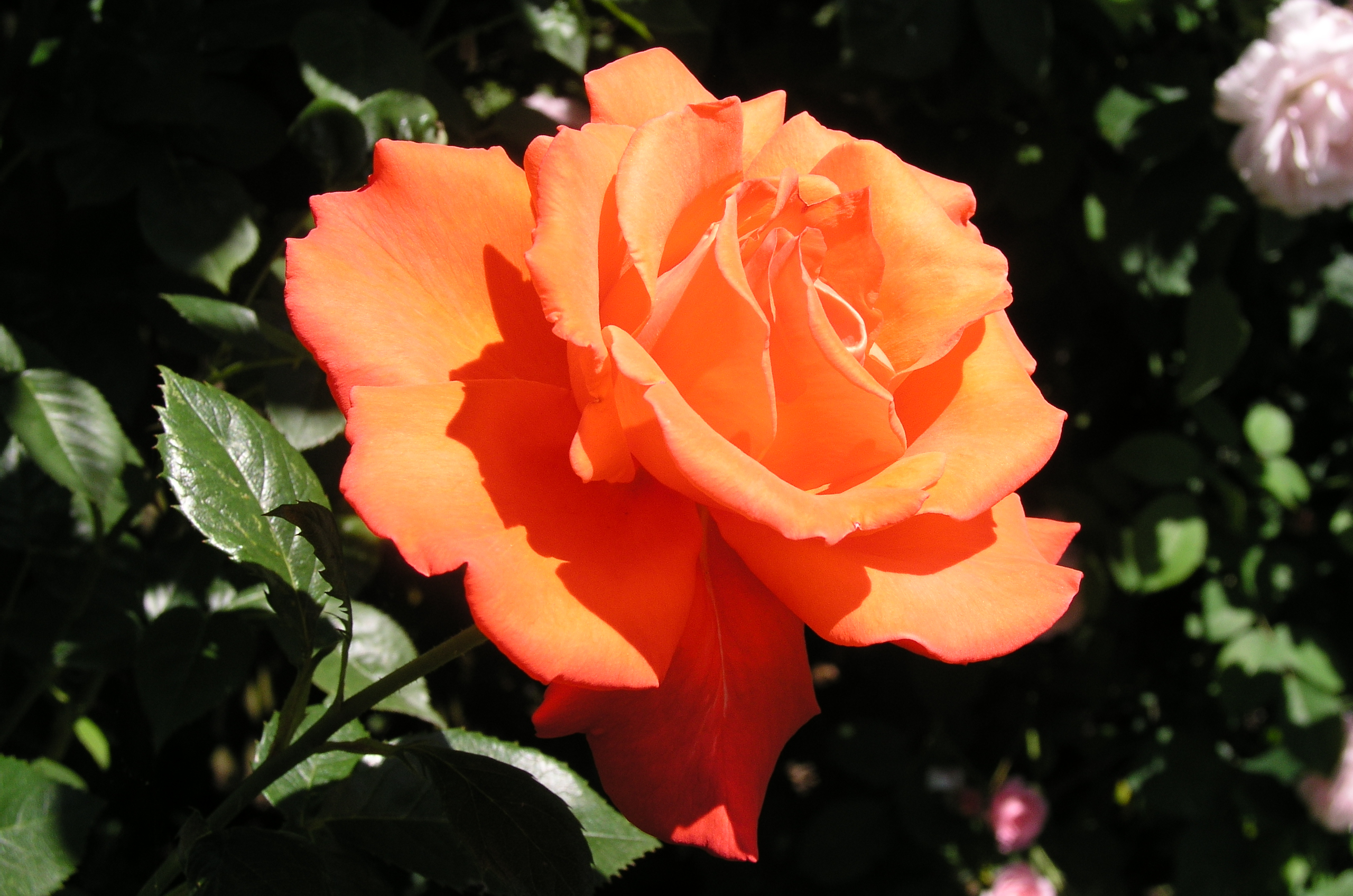
- Rosa 'Alexander'
- Genus: Rosa hybrid
- Cultivar group: hybrid tea
- Cultivar: HARlex
- Breeder: Jack Harkness
- Origin: Great Britain, 1972

Rosa 'Alexander' (AKA HARlex) is an orange-red hybrid tea rose. The cultivar was bred by Jack Harkness and introduced into Great Britain in 1972 by R. Harkness Roses & Co, Ltd. It has been awarded the Award of Garden Merit (AGM) by the Royal National Rose Society (RNRS) in 1993.

== Description ==
'Alexander' is renowned for its "vigour and its brilliant colouring." It is a tall, upright hybrid tea rose, 6 to 8 ft (182–243 cm) in height, with a 3 to 4 ft (91-121 cm) plant spread. The rose has large (26-40 petals) double flowers, typically borne singly in large clusters. 'Alexander' has a mild fragrance and has a bloom color of orange or orange-red. The plant blooms in flushes from spring to fall. The rose's long stems make it ideal for cutting. The foliage is light green, and the plant has many thorns and prickles. It is susceptible to mildew and blackspot.

== History ==
'Alexander' was developed by Jack Harkness of Harkness Roses (R. Harkness & Co. Ltd) at Hitchin, Hertfordshire. The acclaimed nursery, which continues to sell roses today, was established in 1879 in Bedale, Yorkshire by brothers, John Harkness (1857-1933) and (Robert Harkness (1851-1920). Jack Harkness (1918-1994) is the grandson of the original co-founder John Harkness.

'Alexander' was bred by Jack Harkness and introduced into Britain in 1972. Harkness named the rose in honour of Field Marshal Harold Alexander (1891-1969). The parentage of the rose cultivar is a combination of: Rosa 'Tropicana' x (Rosa 'Ann Elizabeth' × Rosa 'Allgold') The rose has five child plants. The rose has won multiple awards including the ADR in 1973, the Hamburg Gold Medal in 1973, The Belfast Gold Medal in 1974, the James Mason Gold Medal in 1987, and the Award of Garden Merit (AGM) by the Royal National Rose Society (RNRS) in 1993.

== Child plants ==
- Rosa 'Breath of life', (Harkness, 1980)
- Rosa 'Grace Donnelly', (Horner, 1991)
- Rosa 'Breath of life', (Harkness, 1980)
- Rosa 'Remember me', (Cocker, 2003)
- Rosa 'Spanish sunset', (Franko Roses, 2008)
