= Rosa 'Yesterday' =

Purple crimson Polyantha rose cultivar

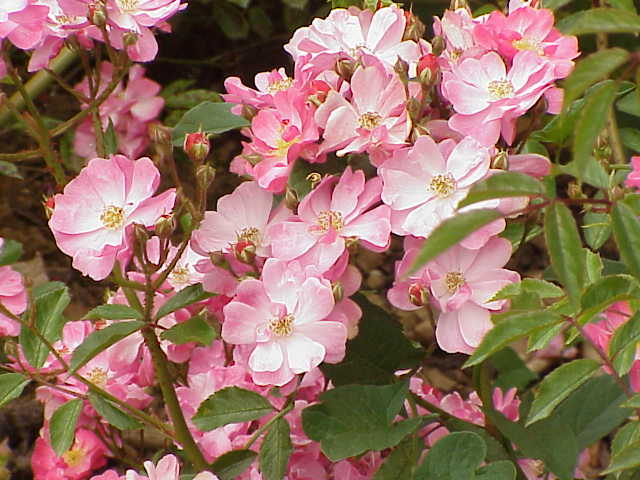
- Rosa 'Yesterday'
- Genus: Rosa hybrid
- Cultivar group: Polyantha
- Marketing names: 'Yesterday', 'Tapis D'Orient'
- Breeder: Jack Harkness
- Origin: Great Britain, 1974

Rosa 'Yesterday' is a purple-crimson Polyantha rose cultivar developed by Jack Harkness and introduced into Great Britain in 1974. The introduction of this rose created a new interest in Polyantha roses, which were popular from 1900 to 1950.

== Description ==
'Yesterday' is a medium bushy shrub, 3 to 4 ft (0.91–1.22 m) in height with a 2 to 3 ft (0.61–0.91 m) spread. Blooms are small, have an average diameter of 1.8 in (46 mm), and an average petal count of 13. Bloom color is a pale purple-crimson with a white center and golden stamens. 'Yesterday' has a lightly cupped, semi-double, rosette bloom form. The rose's fragrance is mild and musky. Flowers are carried in clusters of 5-25. It blooms repeatedly, so it is continuously in flower until late autumn. It has small, healthy, glossy leaves.

== History ==
=== Harkness Roses ===
The rose cultivar was developed by Jack Harkness of Harkness Roses (R. Harkness & Co. Ltd) at Hitchin, Hertfordshire. The acclaimed nursery, which continues to sell roses today, was established in 1879 in Bedale, Yorkshire by brothers, John Harkness (1857–1933) and (Robert Harkness (1851–1920). Jack Harkness (1918–1994) is the grandson of the original co-founder John Harkness. The Harkness family nursery grew roses from the beginning, but did not breed roses until 1962, when Jack Harkness began managing the business.

=== 'Yesterday' ===
Harkness developed 'Yesterday' by crossing ('Phyllis Bede' x 'Shepherd's Delight') x 'Ballerina'. Harkness Roses introduced 'Yesterday' into Britain in 1974. Jack Harkness named this rose 'Yesterday' because all of its ancestors had been developed and introduced many years ago. The introduction of this rose created a renewed interest in Polyantha roses, which were popular from 1900 to 1950. 'Yesterday' was used to hybridize four child plants: 'Smarty' (1977), 'Fairy Prince' (1981), 'Angela' (1984), and 'Lavender Dream' (1984).
