= Rosa 'Ispahan' =

Rose cultivar

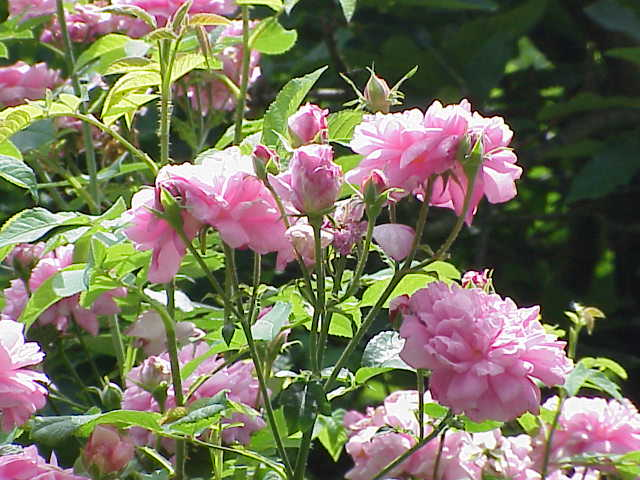
- Hybrid parentage: Rosa hybrid
- Cultivar group: Damask
- Cultivar: 'Ispahan'
- Marketing names: Rose d'Ispahan, Pompon des Princes
- Origin: unknown (before 1827)

Rosa 'Ispahan', also known as 'Rose d'Ispahan' and 'Pompon des Princes', is a clear pink, half-open kind of Damask rose, a type of garden rose introduced from Asia to Europe during the crusading 13th century.

== Description ==
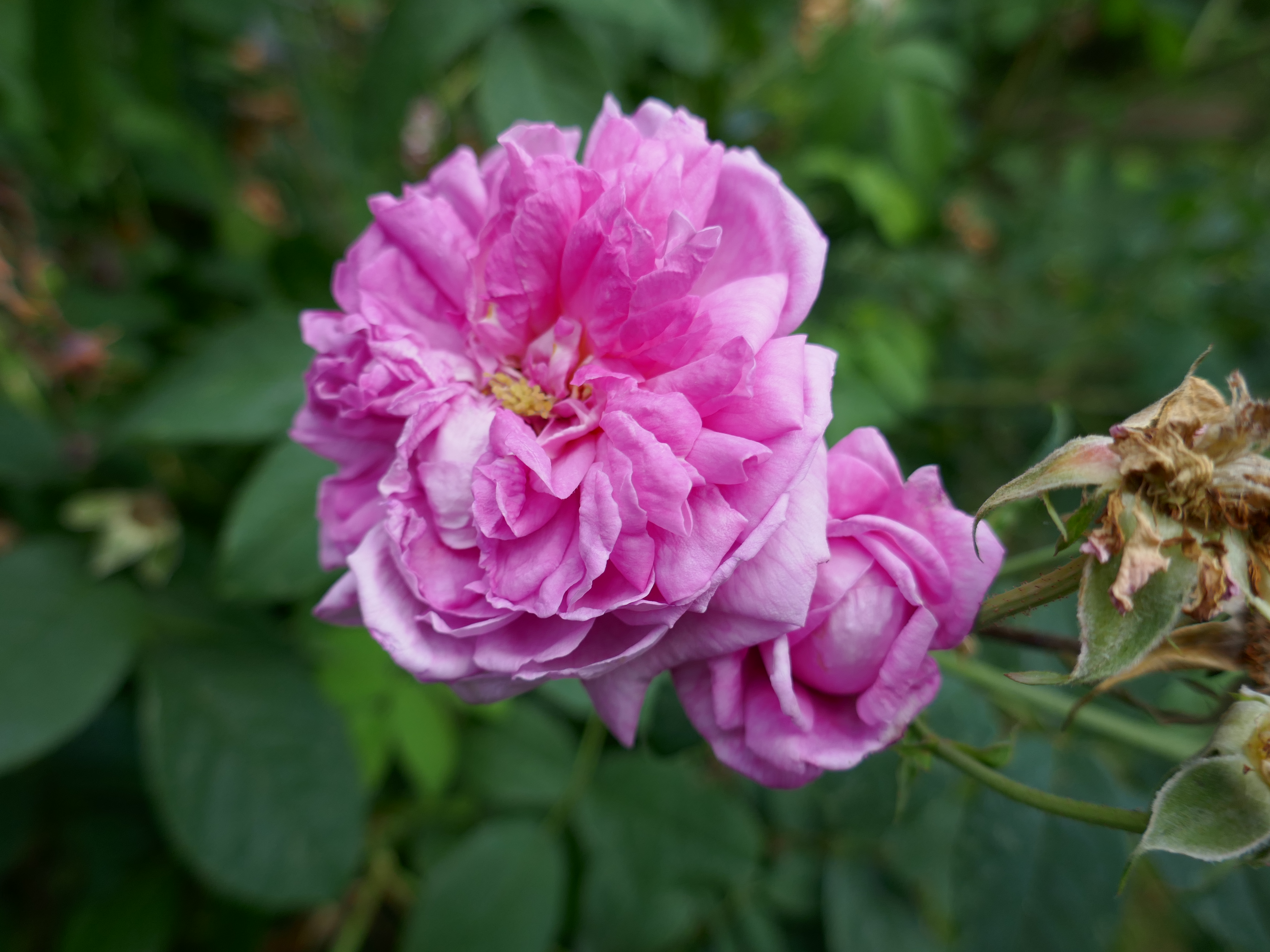
Rosa 'Ispahan' flowering on Rosenhang Karben (Germany)

The double flowers are big, reaching a diameter of 9 centimetres (3.5 in), and have a strong, sweet fragrance. They appear in great numbers in clusters that can hold up to 15 flowers, and are well suited as cut flowers. Their colour is described as silky medium pink, with a slightly darker middle, and fades only slightly. 'Ispahan' flowers only once, but for six weeks – the longest of all Damask roses.

The vigorous shrub grows 1.2 to 2.5 metres (3.9 to 8.2 ft) tall and 0.9 to 2 metres (3.0 to 6.6 ft) wide, with an overhanging form, light green foliage, and few big prickles. It is robust, disease resistant, and winter hardy up to -20 °C (USDA zone 5 to 6). The cultivar tolerates half shade, poor soils and is well suited for harsher climates. It can be grown in containers, solitary, in groups or as hedges.

== History ==
Its origin is unclear – it was introduced in the UK by the garden designer Norah Lindsay (1873–1948), but was probably developed in the early 19th century – probably in Persia. The cultivar is named 'Ispahan' after the city Isfahan in Iran, renowned for its gardens and roses, where the cultivar was discovered in a garden.

The cultivar is still popular. David Austin still recommends it highly as free flowering, among the first Old Roses to start blooming and the last to continue, and for its fine Damask fragrance. Peter Beales counts it as one of his favourite Damask roses, Christine Meile calls the flowering 'Ispahan' the most attractive rose bush and an ideal solitaire plant, if one has enough space. In 1993, it was granted the Award of Garden Merit of the Royal Horticultural Society.
