= Rosa 'Anne Harkness' =

Apricot Floribunda rose cultivar

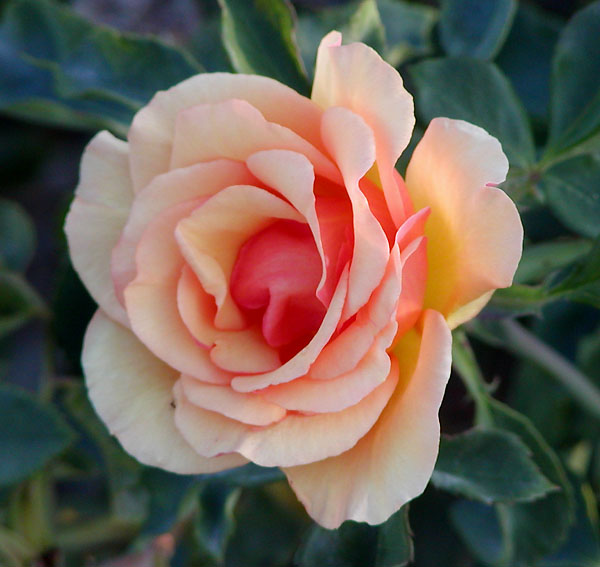
- Rosa 'Anne Harkness'
- Genus: Rosa hybrid
- Cultivar group: Floribunda
- Cultivar: HARkaramal
- Marketing names: 'Anne Harkness', 'Ann Harkness'
- Breeder: Jack Harkness
- Origin: Great Britain, 1979

Rosa 'Anne Harkness' (aka HARkaramel) is an apricot floribunda rose cultivar developed by Jack Harkness in 1979 and introduced into Great Britain in 1980. The rose makes an outstanding cut flower and is exceptionally long lasting in water.

== History ==
The rose cultivar was developed by Jack Harkness of Harkness Roses (R. Harkness & Co. Ltd) at Hitchin, Hertfordshire. The acclaimed nursery, which continues to sell roses today, was established in 1879 in Bedale, Yorkshire by brothers, John Harkness (1857-1933) and (Robert Harkness (1851-1920). Jack Harkness (1918-1994) was the grandson of the original co-founder John Harkness.

'Anne Harkness' was bred by Jack Harkness in 1979 and introduced into Britain in 1980. He named the rose, 'Anne Harkness' to mark the 21st birthday of his niece, Anne Harkness. The parentage of the rose cultivar is a combination of: Rosa 'Bobby Dazzler' × Rosa 'Manx Queen' × Rosa 'Prima Ballerina' × Rosa 'Chanelle' × Rosa 'Piccadilly'. The rose has two child plants: Rosa 'Good as Gold' (Warner, 1994) and Rosa 'Penny Lane' (Harkness, 1998).

== Description ==
'Anne Harkness' is a medium-tall, narrow, upright shrub, 4 to 5 ft (121-152 cm) in height with a 2 to 3 ft (30-60 cm) spread. It has tall stems bearing large clusters of 6 to 20 flowers. Blooms have an average diameter of 2—3 in (5—7 cm) with a petal count of 26 to 40. The double (17-25), medium-sized flowers are lightly scented. Flowers are apricot or apricot-blend in color with yellow or gold edges. 'Anne Harkness' is notable for beginning to bloom late in the season. It is a good repeat bloomer. Flowers can last a very long time in water. It is a popular rose with exhibitors and florists, and is well suited for cut flowers. The flowers are outstanding in August and September. The foliage is very healthy and a glossy, dark green. Powdery mildew can be a problem early in the blooming season.
