= Rosa 'Ena Harkness' =

Red Hybrid tea rose cultivar

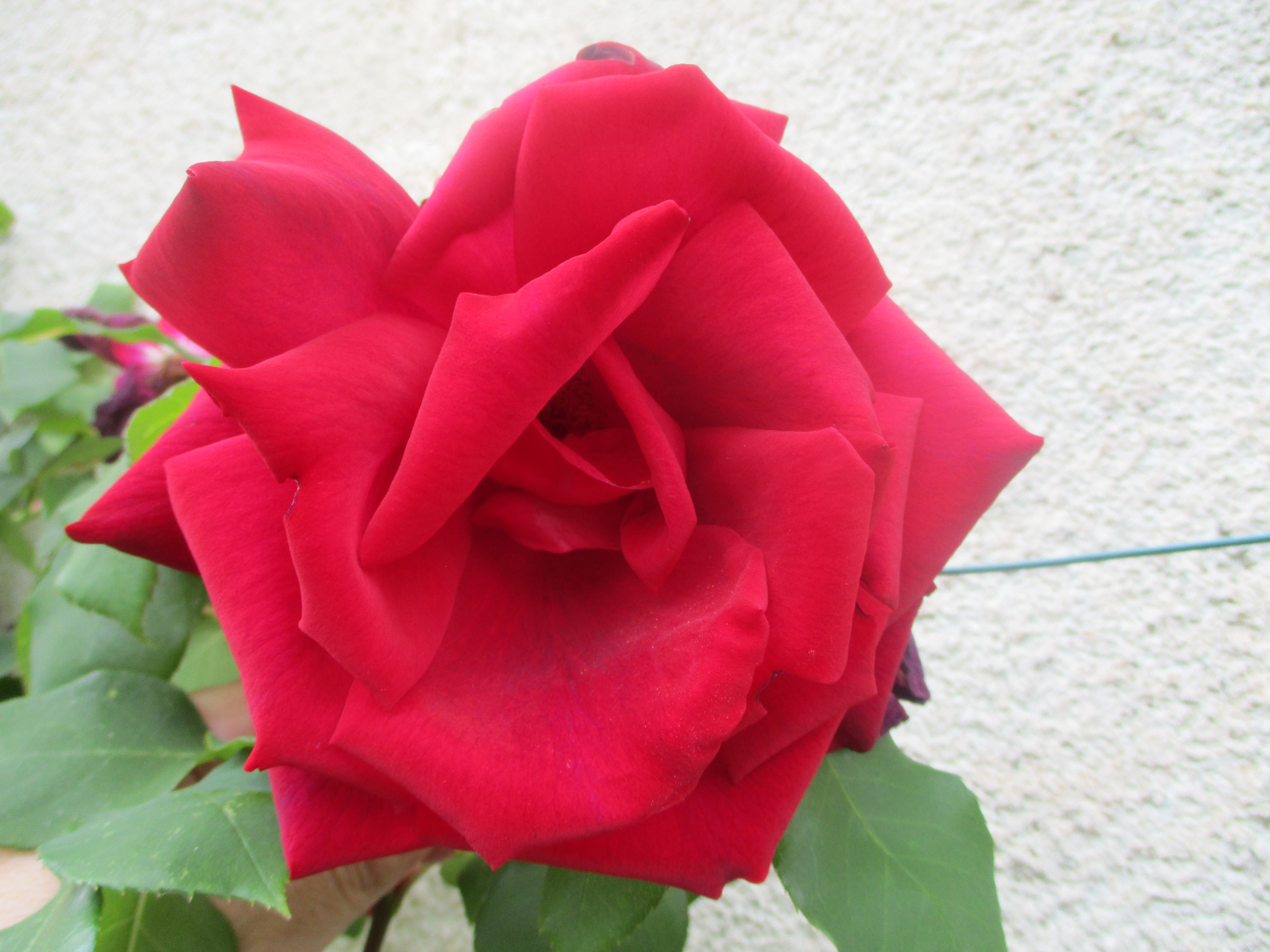
- Rosa 'Ena Harkness'
- Genus: Rosa hybrid
- Hybrid parentage: Rosa 'Southport' x Rosa 'Crimson Glory'
- Cultivar group: Hybrid tea
- Breeder: Albert Norman
- Origin: Great Britain, 1946

Rosa 'Ena Harkness' is a medium red hybrid tea rose cultivar, developed by Albert Norman before 1940 and introduced into Britain by Harkness Roses in 1946. It was awarded the RNRS Gold Medal by the Royal National Rose Society (RNRS) in 1945 and the Portland Gold Medal in 1955.

== Description ==
'Ena Harkness' is a short, upright hybrid tea rose, 2–3 ft (90–121 cm) in height, with a 2 ft (61 cm) plant spread. The rose has a full (26-40 petals) high-centered bloom form with 4–5 inch (10-12.7 cm) flowers. 'Ena Harkness' has a strong fruity fragrance with a medium red bloom color. The rose blooms in flushes from spring to late fall and is very disease resistant. The flowers also hold up to rain very well. The foliage is dark green and the plant has many thorns and prickles.

== History ==
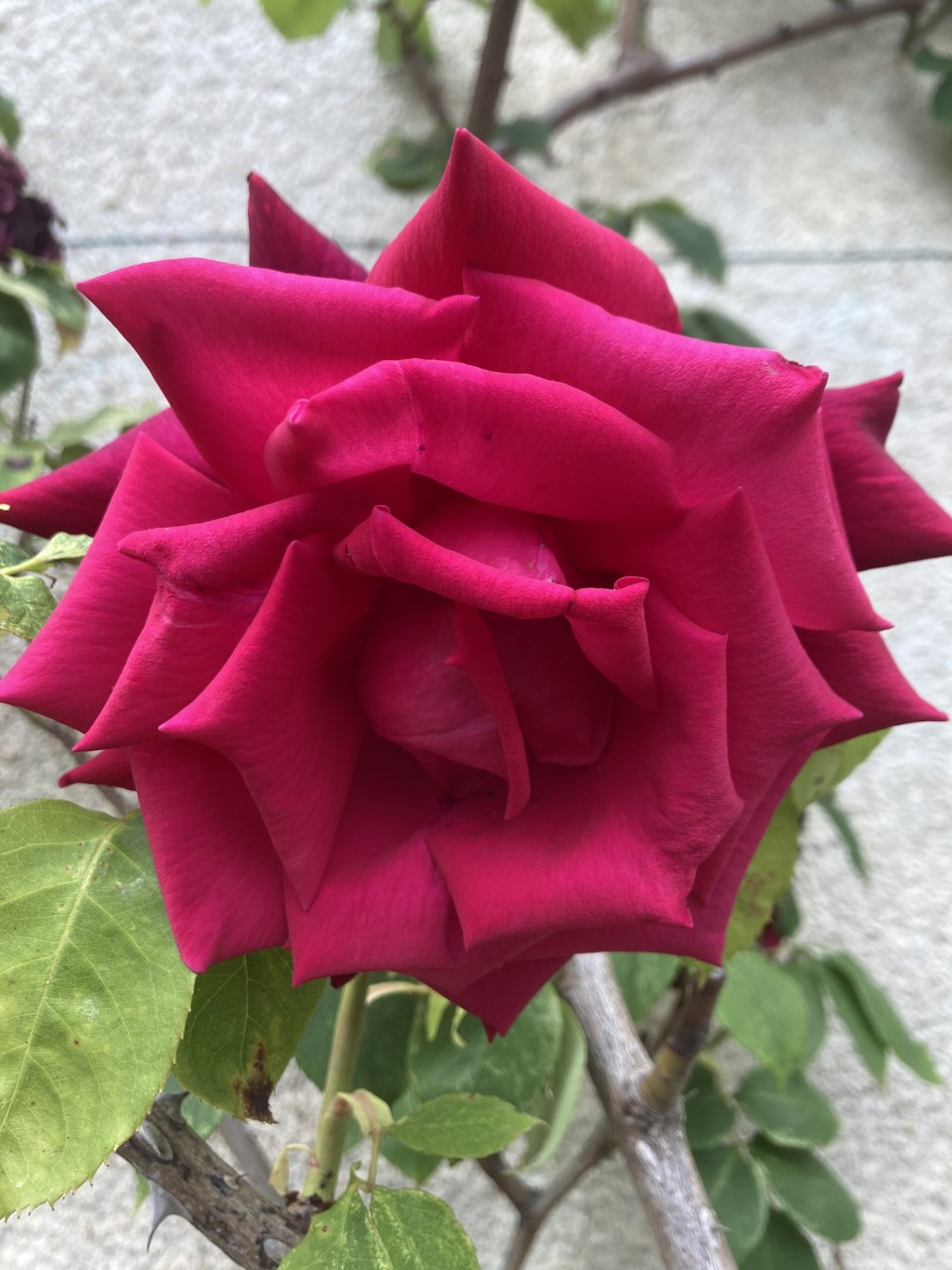
Rose 'Ena Harkness'.

'Ena Harkness' was developed by Albert Norman before 1940. Norman was a diamond cutter by profession, but also an amateur rose breeder. He was a friend of the Harkness family of whose business was Harkness Roses. Norman developed the rose by hybridizing Rosa 'Southport' and Rosa 'Crimson Glory'. He wanted to name his new rose for his friend and rose grower Bill Harkness, but Bill asked him to name the rose after his wife "Ena". Norman also developed 'Frensham', 'Vera Dalton' and 'Anne Elizabeth' for Harkness Roses. Norman later became president of the National Rose Society of Great Britain.

'Ena Harkness' was introduced into Britain by Harkness Roses in 1946 and "made the fortune of the Harkness family". The legendary rose nursery, which continues to sell roses today, was established in 1879 in Bedale, Yorkshire by brothers John Harkness (1857-1933) and (Robert Harkness (1851-1920). 'Ena Harkness' was used to develop two rose cultivars, Rosa 'Hanne' and Rosa 'Red Dandy'. 'Ena Harkness' was awarded the RNRS Gold Medal by the Royal National Rose Society (RNRS) in 1945 and the Portland Gold Medal in 1955.

== Child plants ==
- Rosa 'Hanne' (Soenderhousen, 1959)
- Rosa 'Red Dandy' (Norman, 1959)
