= Rosa 'Pat Nixon' =

Floribunda rose cultivar

- Genus: Rosa
- Cultivar group: Floribunda
- Marketing names: 'Pat Nixon'
- Breeder: House of Meilland
- Origin: France

Rosa 'Pat Nixon' is a dark red floribunda garden rose cultivar. It was created in France by the House of Meilland and introduced in the United States in 1972, while Pat Nixon was First Lady, by the C. W. Stuart & Co. nursery of Newark, New York. It is planted in the White House Rose Garden and in the grounds of the Richard Nixon Presidential Library and Museum.

== Description ==
'Pat Nixon' is a red-black floribunda. The flowers are deep red, many-petalled and velvety in texture, and the colour deepens along the margin of each petal so that the outline of the petal stands out. The plants are dense and vigorous and carry their blooms in clusters, which makes the cultivar useful for massed colour; the scent is slight and the foliage is glossy and green. It blooms in flushes through the season.

== History ==
Dick Hutton, who represented the House of Meilland in North America at the time, described the rose as a cross of 'Tomango' with a seedling of 'Fireking' and 'Banzai', and compared it to 'Tomango' as a freer-flowering plant with smaller blooms. C. W. Stuart & Co. wished to market it under Pat Nixon's name and was granted permission to do so, and the name was recorded on a plant patent taken out by the nursery in 1974. According to Hutton, sales fell within a couple of years of the rose's release because of the political troubles of Pat Nixon's husband.

== Plantings ==
Roses have been named for First Ladies since about the turn of the twentieth century, but few of those cultivars remain in the White House Rose Garden. 'Pat Nixon' is one that does, in a southeast corner that receives sun each morning.

At the Richard Nixon Presidential Library and Museum in Yorba Linda, California, the cultivar is planted together with 'Abraham Lincoln' at the head of the reflecting pool at the center of the complex. In 2013 the library's museum store sold 150 bushes raised from cuttings of those plants.

== See also ==
- Garden roses
