= Rosa 'Mrs. Harkness' =

Hybrid Perpetual rose cultivar

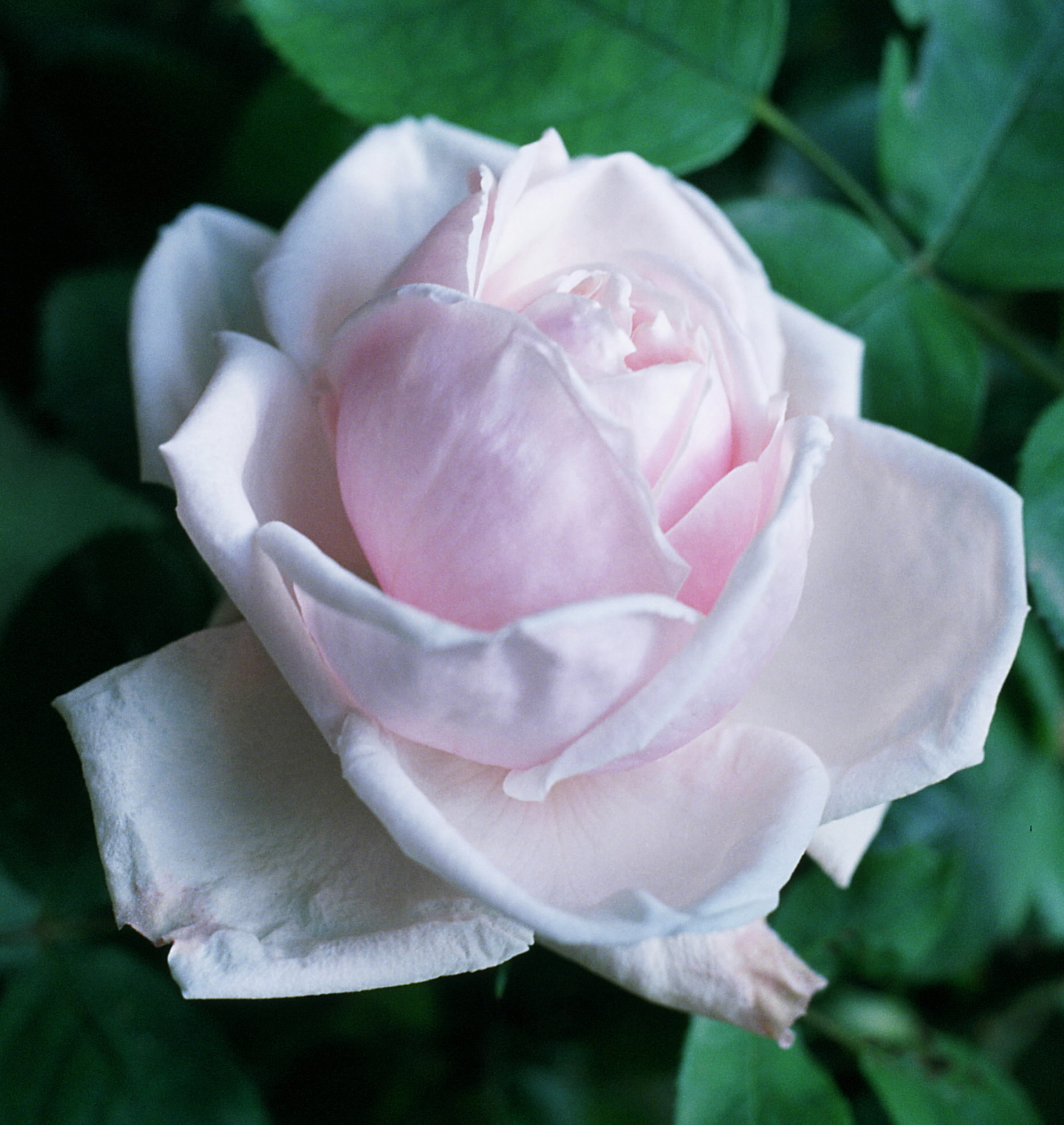
- Hybrid parentage: 'Heinrich Schultheis'
- Cultivar group: Hybrid Perpetual
- Cultivar: Mrs. Harkness
- Marketing names: 'Paul's Early Blush'
- Origin: George Paul, Jr., UK, 1893

Rosa 'Mrs. Harkness' (syn. Paul's Early Blush) is a rare light pink rose cultivar discovered by George Paul in Great Britain in 1893. It is a sport of the deep pink hybrid perpetual 'Heinrich Schultheis', introduced by Henry Bennet in 1882. The RHS Encyclopedia of Roses lists 'Paul's Early Blush' (Paul 1893) and 'Mrs Harkness' (Harkness, 1893) as two separate sports of 'Heinrich Schultheis', while Peter Beales uses the names synonymously.

The name 'Mrs. Harkness' was given by John Harkness in honour of his mother and introduced by Harkness and Sons in 1893.

'Mrs. Harkness' has large double flowers with a cupped bloom form and 17 to 25 petals and a strong cinnamon fragrance. They are pale pink and appear quite early solitary or in small clusters of up to four flowers on the repeat flowering shrub.

The vigorous rose bush grows upright and reaches a height of about 90 to 150 cm (3.0 to 4.9 ft) and 90 cm width. The leaves grow on thick have a dark greyish green colour. 'Mrs. Harkness' tolerates poorer soils, is winter hardy down to −20 °C (USDA zone 6), but is susceptible to mildew. The cultivar can be grown in containers.
