= Rosa 'Compassion' =

Pink blend modern climbing rose cultivar

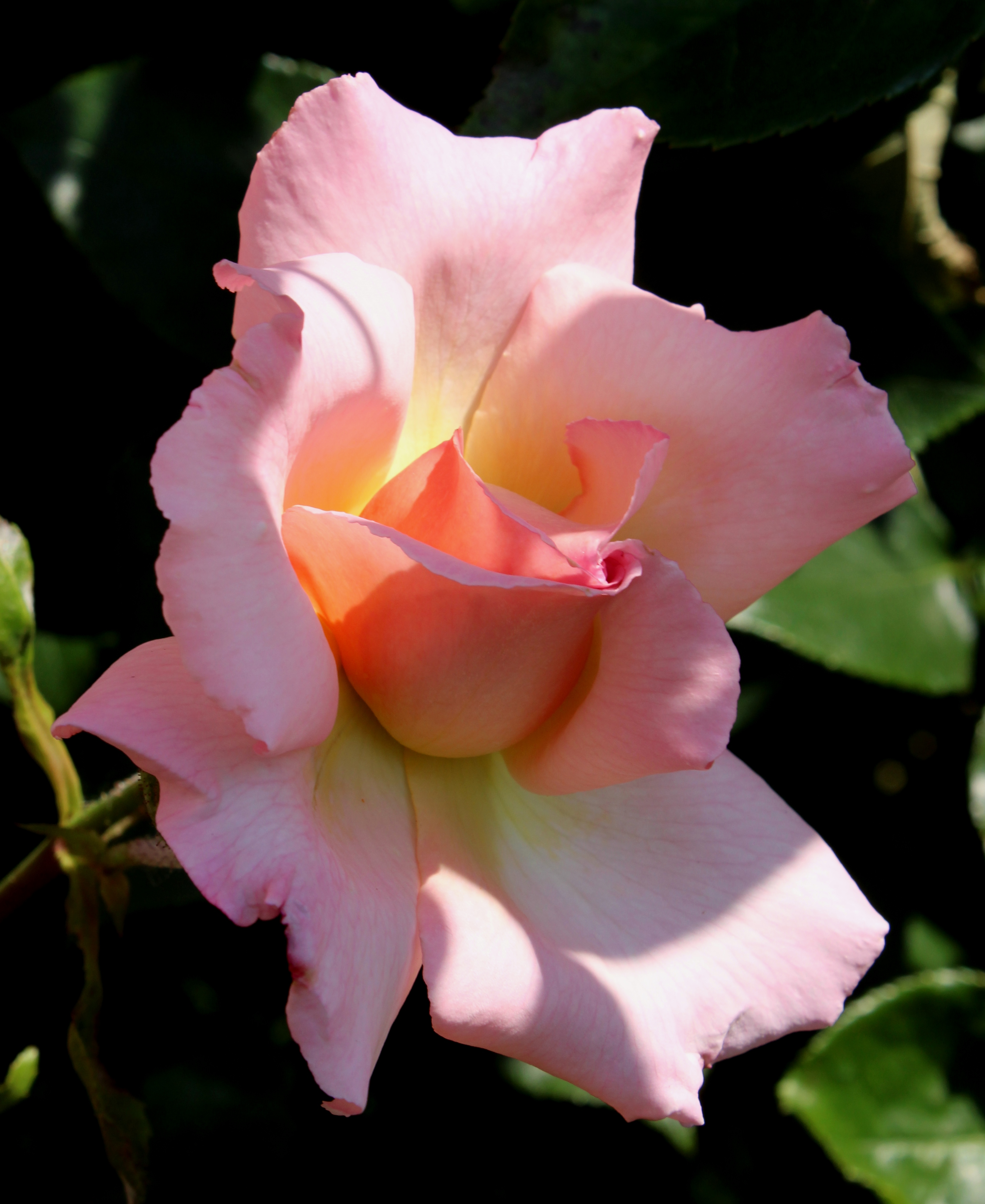
- Rosa 'Compassion'
- Genus: Rosa hybrid
- Cultivar group: Climbing hybrid tea rose
- Marketing names: 'Compassion', 'Belle de Londres'
- Breeder: Jack Harkness
- Origin: Great Britain, 1972

Rosa 'Compassion' is a pink-blend climbing rose cultivar developed by Jack Harkness and introduced into Great Britain in 1972. It is considered to be one of the best modern climbers and is a popular selling rose in Britain.

== History ==
=== Harkness Roses ===
The rose cultivar was developed by Jack Harkness of Harkness Roses (R. Harkness & Co. Ltd) at Hitchin, Hertfordshire. The acclaimed nursery, which continues to sell roses today, was established in 1879 in Bedale, Yorkshire by brothers, John Harkness (1857-1933) and (Robert Harkness (1851-1920). Jack Harkness (1918-1994) is the grandson of the original co-founder John Harkness. The Harkness family nursery grew roses from the beginning, but did not breed roses until 1962 when Jack Harkness began managing the business.

=== 'Compassion' ===
Harkness developed the rose cultivar by crossing the white, large-flowered climber, 'White Cockade' and the pink Hybrid tea rose, 'Prima Ballerina'. Harkness Roses introduced 'Compassion' into Britain in 1972. It is considered to be one of the best modern climbers and is a popular selling rose in Britain. 'Compassion' has six child plants: Rosa 'City Girl' (Harkness, 1985), Rosa 'High Hopes', Rosa 'Highfield', Rosa 'Loving Lorna', Rosa 'Paul Shirville', and Rosa 'Rosemary Harkness'.

"When its flowers first open, they are extraordinarily beautiful: a mixture of salmon, pink, apricot, and orange, with pink on the upper sides of the petals. They develop from classic Hybrid tea buds into a pretty, ruffled confection of petals."

— Quest-Ritson, 2003

== Description ==
'Compassion' is a modern climbing tea rose, 5 to 15 ft (1.5–4.6 m) in height with a 4 to 5 ft (1.2–1.5 m) spread. Blooms are large, have an average diameter of 4 in (100 mm), and a petal count of 26 to 40. Bloom color is a blend of salmon, pink, apricot, and orange and fades to off-white as the flowers mature. Scent is strong and fruity. Flowers are carried mostly solitary or in small clusters of up to five and have a classic hybrid tea bloom form.

'Compassion' blooms repeatedly throughout the season. It is very disease resistant and makes an excellent cut flower as well as a garden shrub. It also can be trained as a pillar rose. Foliage is large, dark green and glossy. The plant has many prickles and a dense, upright growth habit. 'Compassion' is known in France as 'Belle de Londres'.
