= Rosa 'Angel Face' =

Rose cultivar

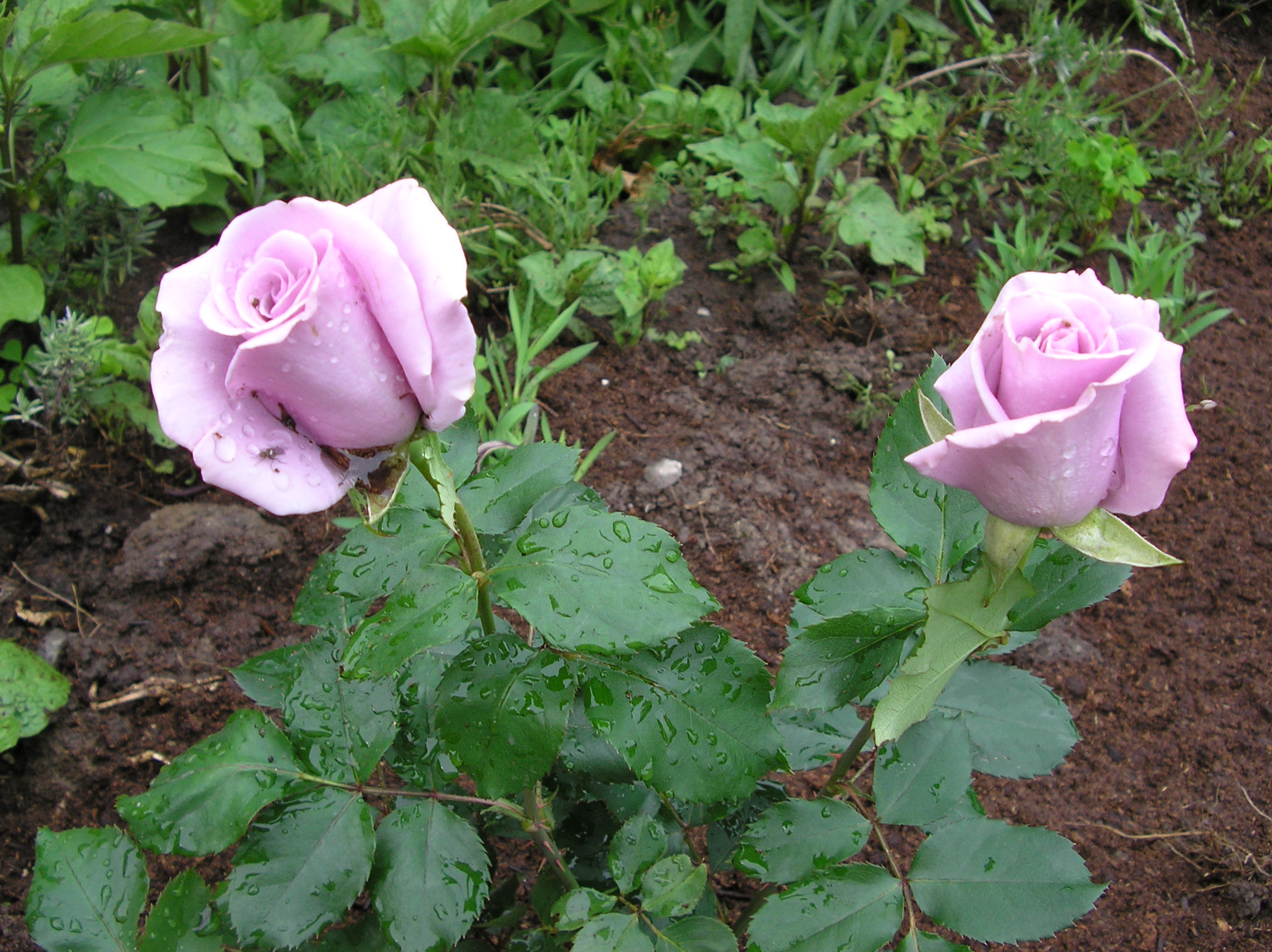
- Genus: Rosa hybrid
- Hybrid parentage: ('Circus' × 'Lavender Pinocchio') x 'Sterling Silver'
- Cultivar group: Floribunda
- Breeder: Swim & Weeks
- Origin: United States, 1968

Rosa 'Angel Face' is a pink floribunda rose cultivar, developed by Herbert Swim & Weeks Rose Growers, and introduced into the United States in 1968.. 'Angel Face' is a cross between floribundas, ('Circus' × 'Lavender Pinocchio') and hybrid tea, 'Sterling Silver'. The rose was named an All-America Rose Selections winner in 2002.

== Description ==
According to Charles and Brigid Quest-Ritson, in their Encyclopedia of Roses, "'Angel Face' may have been introduced over 30 years ago, but it is still the best mauve Floribunda—living proof that old roses are sometimes better than new."

'Angel Face' is an upright, bushy plant with lustrous foliage and a neat 3-foot-tall and -wide form. It is a good rose to use as a cut flower. It is a compact growing plant, and blooms abundantly. It does best in full sun and any well-drained soil. It has 3", lavender ruffled-edge blossoms, edged in an attractive deeper ruby, and often grows on single stems as well as in clusters. The fragrance is strong and sweet, and the rose has won prizes for fragrance. It is hardy in zones 5–9. One must take intentional precautions against insects and disease early in the growing season, for the fragrant blossoms are a favorite snack to aphids and do fall prey to rose rust.

== Awards ==
- All-America Rose Selections (AARS) winner, USA, (1969)
