= Harkness Roses =

Rose breeders in England

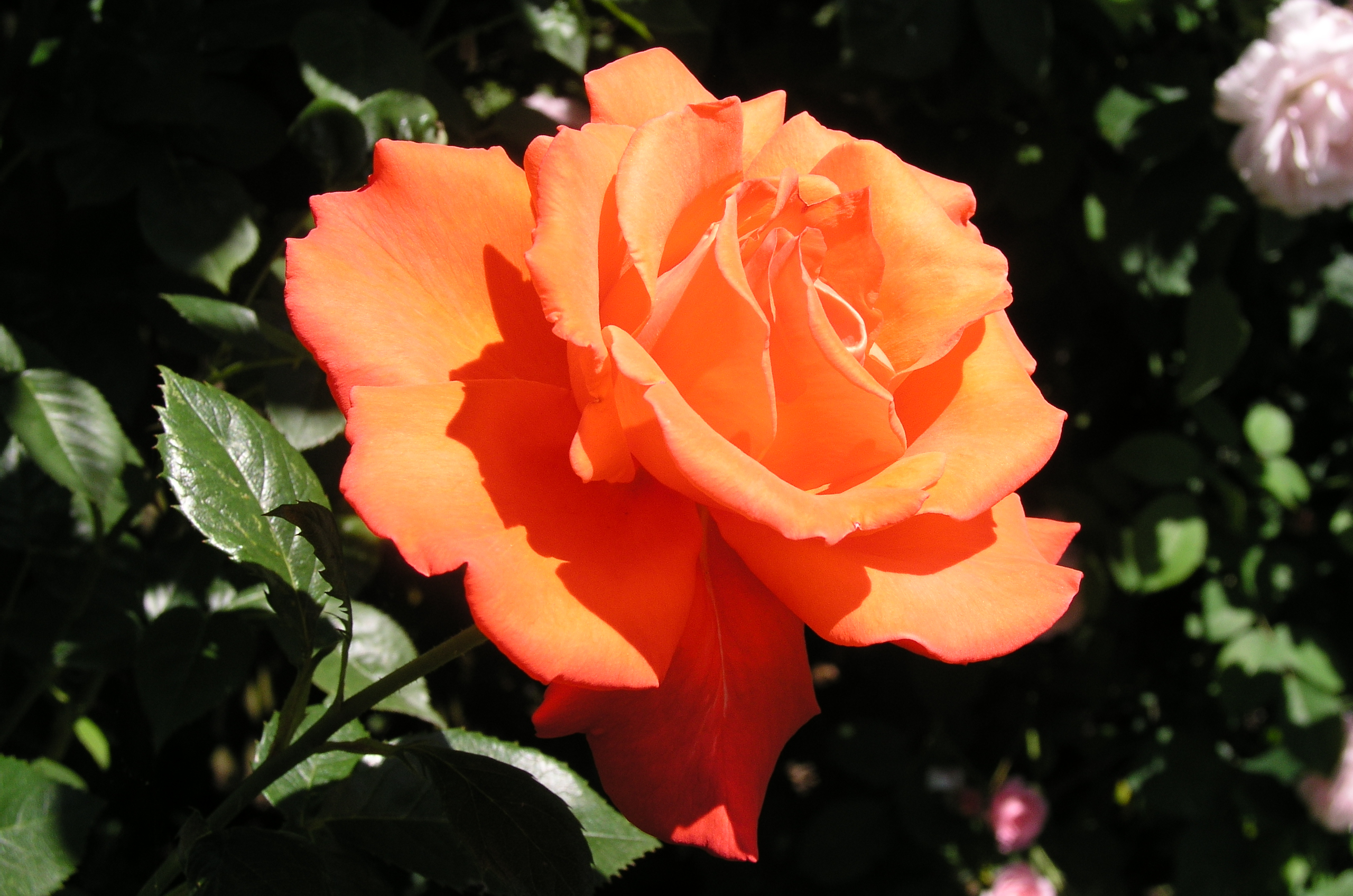
Rosa 'Alexander', 1972

Harkness Roses (a trading name of R. Harkness & Co. Ltd) are rose breeders based at Hitchin, Hertfordshire in England. The nursery was founded in 1879 in Yorkshire by brothers, John and Robert Harkness. Early varieties include 'Mrs. Harkness', 'Frensham' and 'Ena Harkness'. Jack Harkness, grandson of original co-founder, John Harkness, established the first rose hybridization program at the company in 1962, developing vigorous, healthy roses by hybridizing from wild rose species. His most successful new rose cultivars include: 'Amber Queen', 'Belmonte' and 'Anne Harkness'.

== History ==
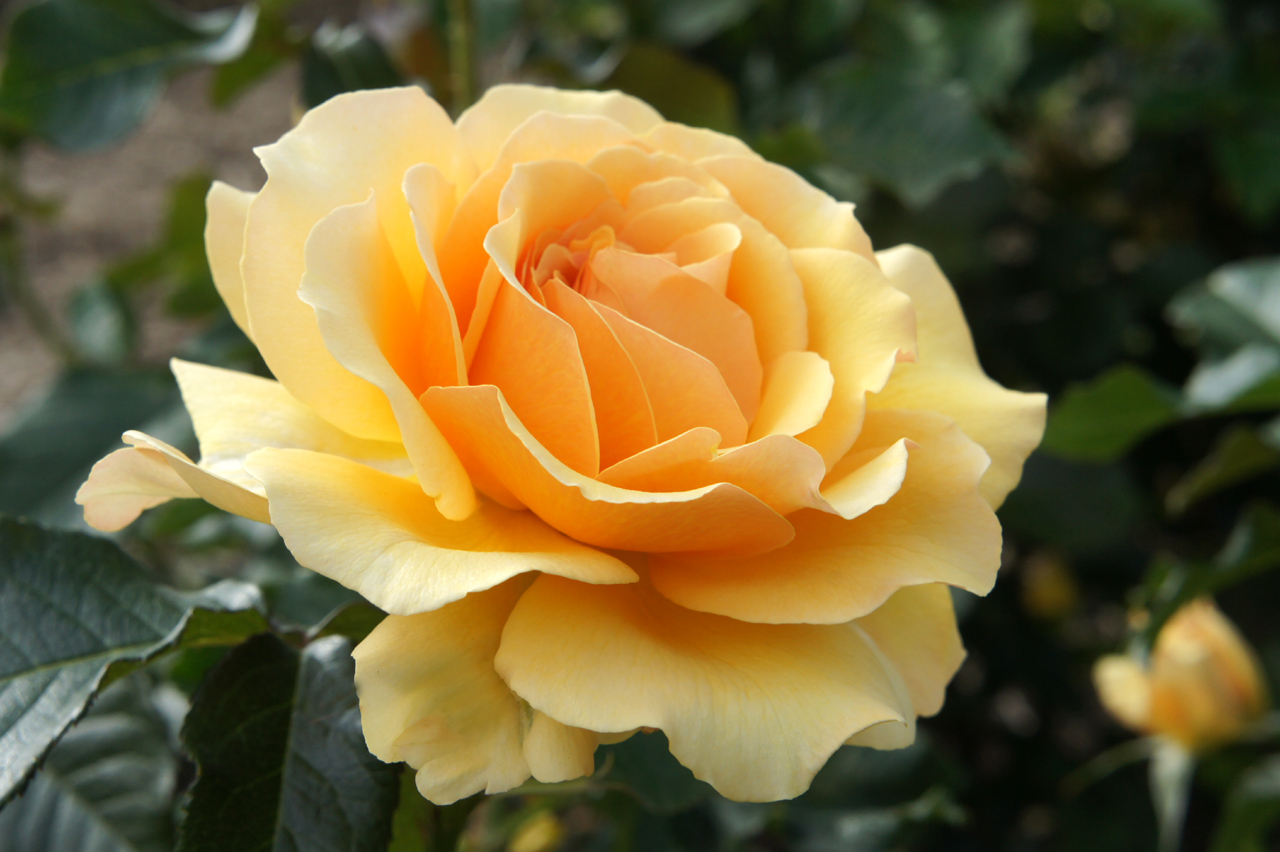
Rosa 'Amber Queen'

Harkness Roses was established in 1879 in Bedale, Yorkshire by brothers, John Harkness (1857-1933) and Robert Harkness (1851-1920). In 1882, John and Robert began to grow and exhibit roses. Their new rose business was a great success; Queen Victoria purchased her roses from Harkness & Sons in the 1890s. John and Robert soon realized that Yorkshire's climate was too cold for an expanding rose growing business. In 1892, they decided to established a branch of the firm in a location with a warmer climate. Neither brother wanted to leave Yorkshire, so it was decided by a coin toss that Robert would move to Hitchin, Hertfordshire to establish the new branch of Harkness and Sons. In 1901, John and Robert decided to dissolve the company and create two separate nurseries. Robert established R. Harkness & Co, today known as Harkness Roses.

Early varieties of Harkness Roses include a sport of hybrid perpetual, 'Heinrich Schultheis', introduced in 1893 as 'Mrs. Harkness'. In the 1950s, Harkness popularized 'Frensham' and 'Ena Harkness', both introduced in 1946 in the United Kingdom

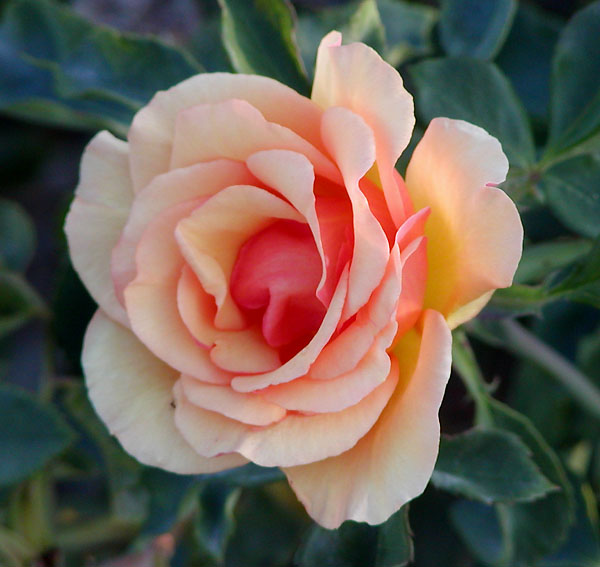
Rosa 'Anne Harkness'

Jack Harkness (1918-1994) was the grandson of the original co-founder John Harkness. He established the first rose hybridization program at the company in 1962, developing vigorous, healthy roses by hybridizing from wild rose species. Early successes were with hybrid teas, and then later with floribundas. In the 1970s he began breeding with Rosa persica, an unusual rose species with simple leaves. During his career, Harkness developed many successful rose cultivars, including 'Alexander', 'Mountbatten' and 'Amber Queen'. He is best known for his floribundas and hybrid tea roses.

Robert Harkness, son of Jack Harkness (1951-2012), bred more than seventy rose varieties during his career. Among his best known varieties are: Rosa 'Belmonte' and 'Princess of Wales'. Philip Harkness, Jack's son and Robert's brother continues today as co-owner of Harkness Roses.

Today Harkness Roses is run by Philip Harkness (Chairman) and David White (Managing Director) alongside their small team of horticulturists. Philip, David and their team have recently released a number of extremely popular new cultivars including ‘The Captain Tom’ rose, the ‘John Ystumllyn Rose’, ‘The Duke of Edinburgh Rose’ and ‘The Queen Elizabeth II Rose’ as well as winning a Gold Medal at Chelsea Flower Show in 2021.

Poet, Ted Hughes, worked at the nursery during the summer of 1955: "The job is following round the expert as he grafts expensive rose-buds onto common bushes, and doing all the trimming and tying-up-with-raffia—a back-breaking job apparently, but outside, and with roses, and with good employers."

== Selected roses ==
- 'Mrs. Harkness' (1893)
- 'Frensham' (1946)
- 'Ena Harkness' (1946)
- 'Alexander' (1972)
- 'Compassion' (1972)
- 'Yesterday' (1974)
- 'Margaret Merril' (1978)
- 'Anne Harkness' (1979)
- 'Amber Queen' (AARS) (1983)
- 'Bill Slim' (1987)
- 'Savoy Hotel' (1989)
- 'Princess of Wales' (1997)
- 'Pride of England' (1998)
- 'Bridge of Sighs' (2000)
- 'Rosa Belmonte' (2007)
- 'Duke of Edinburgh' (2021)
