= Rosa 'Amber Queen' =

Floribunda rose cultivar

Rosa 'Amber Queen
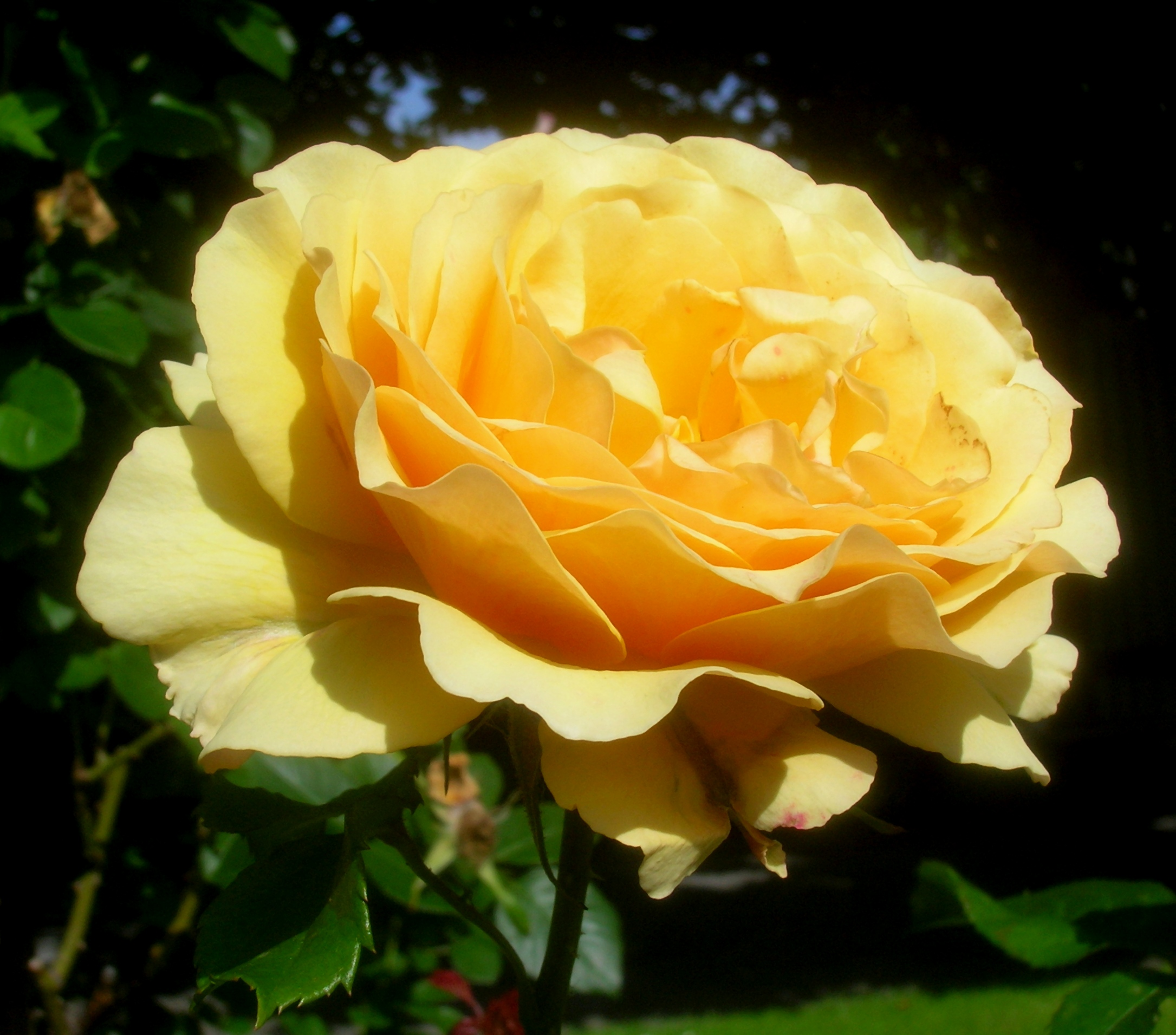
- Rosa 'Amber Queen'
- Genus: Rosa hybrid
- Hybrid parentage: 'Southampton' x 'Typhoon'
- Cultivar group: Floribunda
- Cultivar: HARroony
- Marketing names: 'Amber Queen', 'Prinz Eugen von Savoyen'
- Breeder: Harkness
- Origin: Great Britain, 1983(

Rosa 'Amber Queen, (aka HARroony), is a floribunda rose cultivar, bred by Jack Harkness and introduced in Great Britain by Harkness Roses as 'Amber Queen' in 1984. The stock parents of this rose are the floribunda, Rosa 'Southampton' and the hybrid tea, Rosa 'Typhoon'.

== Description ==
'Amber Queen' is a short bushy shrub, 2 to 3 ft (60—90 cm) in height with a 1 to 2 ft (30—60 cm) spread. Blooms have an average diameter of 4—5 in (10—12cm) with a petal count of 26 to 40. The flowers have a cupped, ruffled bloom form.

Flowers are an apricot blend, with variations of apricot, pink and yellow in color. There are typically 3 to 7 flowers in a cluster. The scent is strong and spicy. The leaves are very large, dark red initially, later turning dark green and glossy. The plant has a spreading habit with reddish prickles. The plant is very disease resistant and a repeat bloomer. It thrives in USDA zone 6 and warmer.

== Child plants ==
'Amber Queen' was used to hybridize the following plants:

- Rosa 'Mary Jean', (1990)
- Rosa 'Home of Time', (1998)
- Rosa 'Honey Bouquet' (1999)
- Rosa 'Festival des Jardins de Chaumont', (2006)

== Awards ==
- Rose of the Year (ROTY), (1984)(
- Belfast Gold Medal, (1986)(
- Genoa Gold Medal, (1986)(
- Orleans Gold Medal, (1987)(
- All-America Rose Selections winner, USA, (1988)(
- James Mason Gold Medal, (1993)(
- FA & Golden Rose of the Hague, (1991)(

== See also ==
- Garden roses
- Rose Hall of Fame
- List of Award of Garden Merit roses
