= Floribunda (rose) =

Flowering plant cultivar

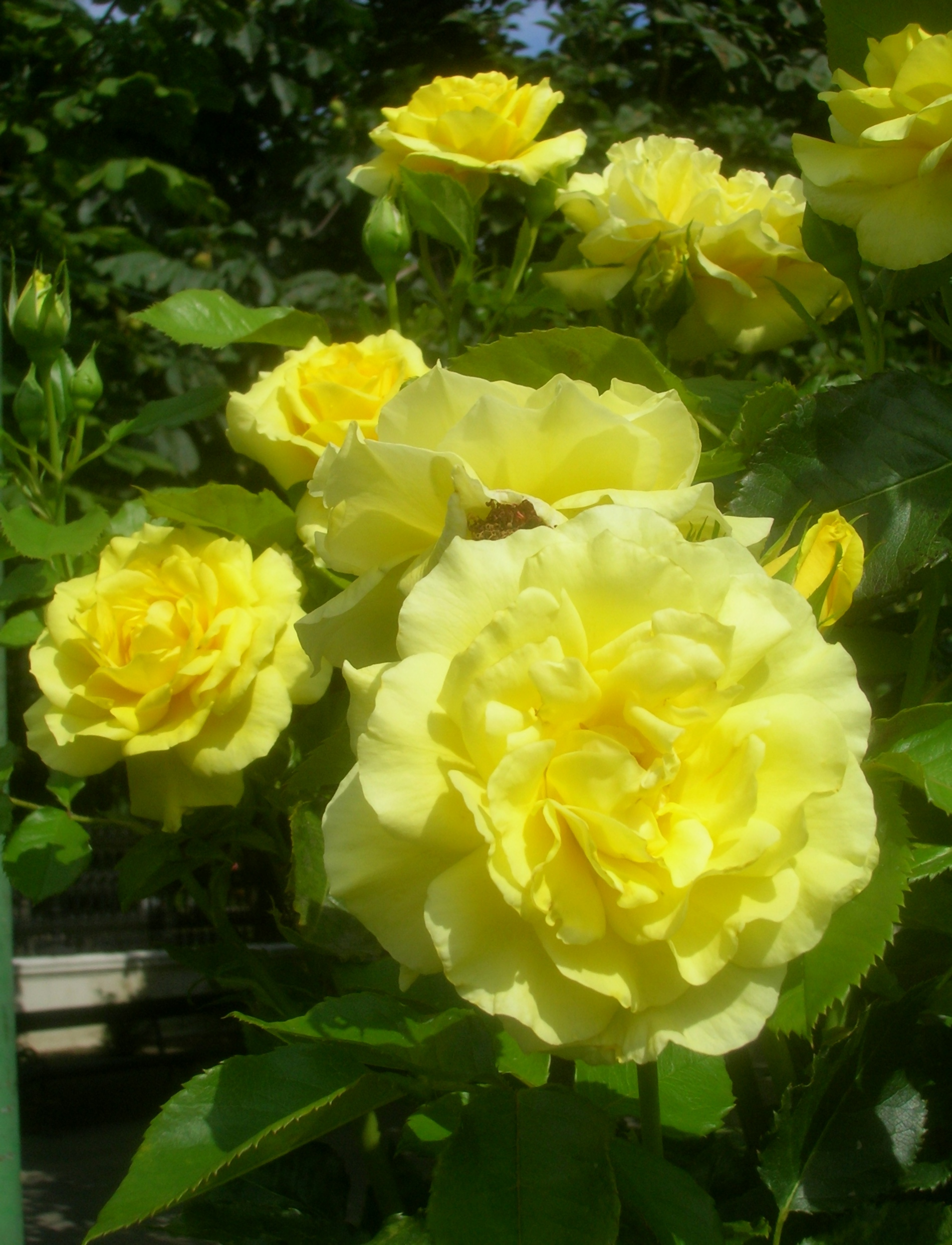
'Sunsprite', Kordes 1973

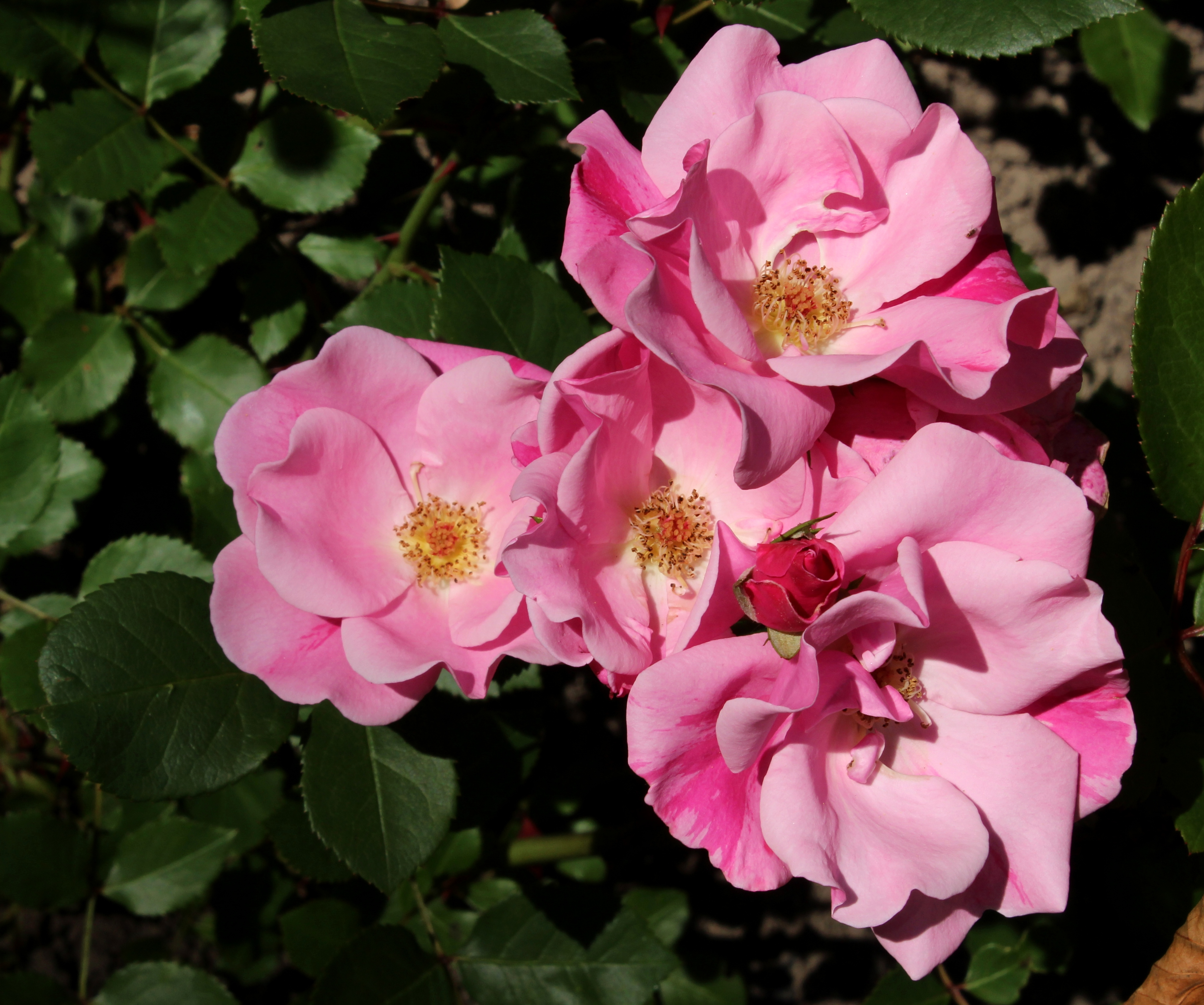
'Else Poulsen' (Poulsen 1924), an early Floribunda cultivar

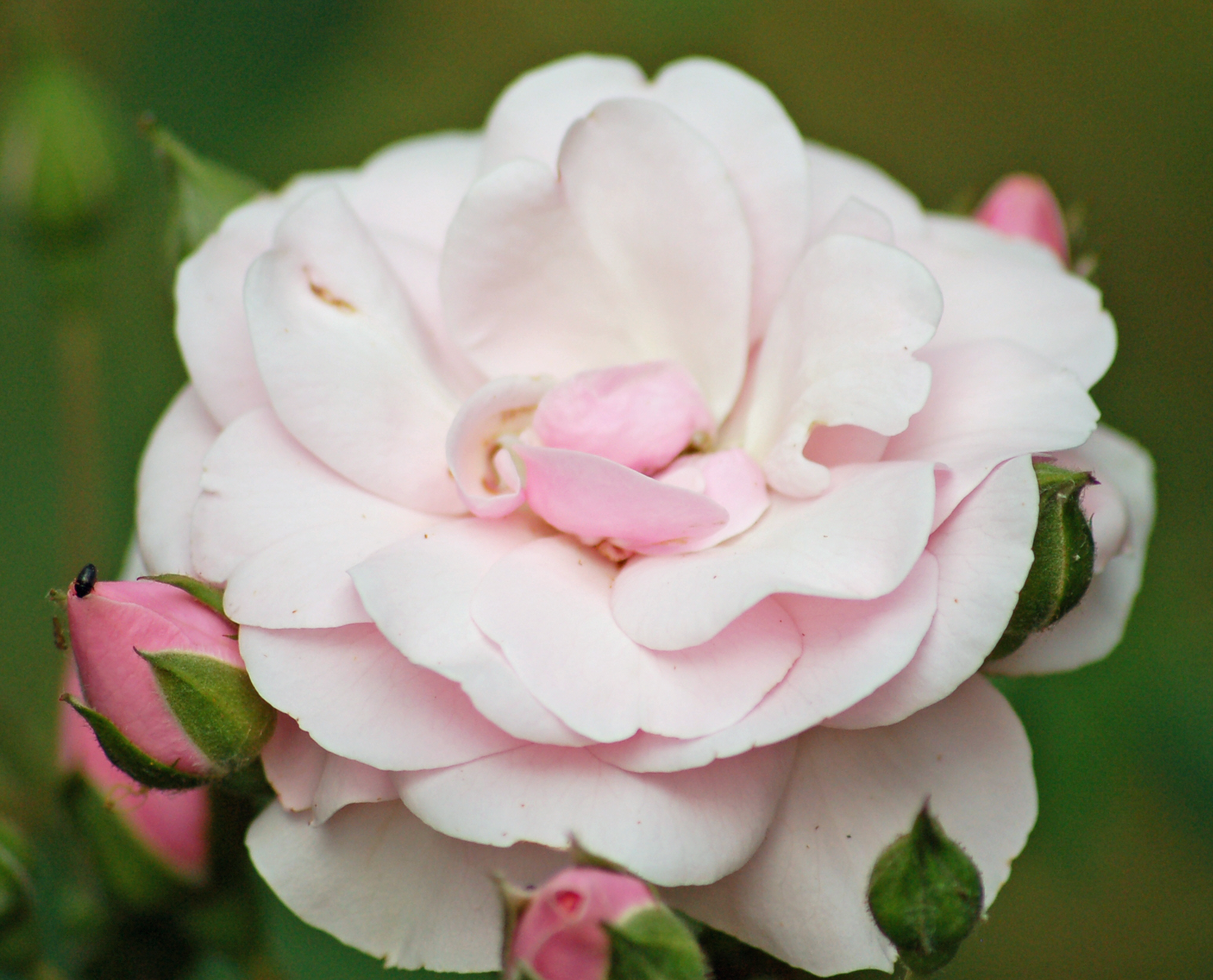
Floribunda Diadem (Tantau 1986) Rosarium Uetersen

Floribunda (Latin for "many-flowering") is a modern cultivar group of garden roses that was developed by crossing hybrid teas with polyantha roses, the latter being derived from crosses between Rosa chinensis and Rosa multiflora (sometimes called R. polyantha). The idea was to create roses that bloomed with the polyantha profusion, but with hybrid tea floral beauty and colour range.

The first polyantha/hybrid tea cross, 'Rødhætte' ('Red Riding Hood'), was introduced by the Danish breeder Dines Poulsen in 1907. It possessed characteristics of both its parent classes, and was initially called a Hybrid Polyantha or Poulsen rose. Poulsen continued this line of work in subsequent years, introducing several Hybrid Polyanthas such as 'Else Poulsen' in 1924. Other breeders also began introducing similar varieties, and in 1930 the name "floribunda" was coined by Dr. J.N. Nicolas, a rose hybridizer for Jackson & Perkins in the US. This term has been used since then to describe cultivars which in their ancestry have crosses between hybrid teas and polyanthas.

Typical floribundas feature stiff shrubs, smaller and bushier than the average hybrid tea but less dense and sprawling than the average polyantha. The flowers are often smaller than hybrid teas but are carried in large sprays, giving a better floral effect in the garden. Floribundas are found in all hybrid tea colours and with the classic hybrid tea-shaped blossom, sometimes differing from hybrid teas only in their cluster-flowering habit. Today they are still used in large bedding schemes in public parks and similar spaces.

== Selection of cultivars ==
Cultivar	Hybridizer	Year	Colour	Notes	Photo
'Angel Face'	Swim & Weeks	1968	Lavender		
'Amber Queen'	Harkness	1984	Yellow	Rose of the Year 1984	
'Anne Harkness'	Harkness	1979	Apricot		
'Arthur Bell'	McGredy	1964	Yellow		
'Bonica 82'	Meilland	1982	Pink	Rose Hall of Fame; AGM 1993	
'Cherish'	Warriner	1980	Pale Pink		
'Dainty Maid'	LeGrice	1940	Pink Blend	Portland Gold 1941	
'Edelweiß'	Poulsen	1969	Cream		
'English Miss'	Cant	1977	Pale Pink	AGM 2001	
'Gruß an Aachen'	Geduldig	1909	Pale Pink		
'Heidi Klum'	Rosen Tantau	1999	Pink		
'Iceberg'	Kordes	1958	White	Rose Hall of Fame	
'Julia Child'	Carruth	2004	Yellow	Best of the Best 2010; AGM 2012	
'Montana'	Rosen Tantau	1974	Red		
'Pacific Dream'	James	2006	Purple		
'Pat Nixon'	Meilland	1972	Red		
'Poesie'	Warriner	1988	Pink		
'Princess of Wales'	Harkness	1997	White	AGM 2002	
'Rosa Gruß an Aachen'		1930	Pink		
'Sexy Rexy'	McGredy	1984	Pink		
'Shockwave'	Carruth	2006	Yellow		
'Saint Tropez'	Pierre Orard	~2015	Yellow	Yellow, orange, and apricot blend	
'Sunsprite'	Kordes	1973	Yellow		
'Tuscan Sun'	Zary	2002	Orange		
'Yesterday'	Harkness	1974	Pink		

== See also ==
- Garden roses
