= Rosa 'Soleil d'Or' =

Ancestor of the modern Hybrid tea rose

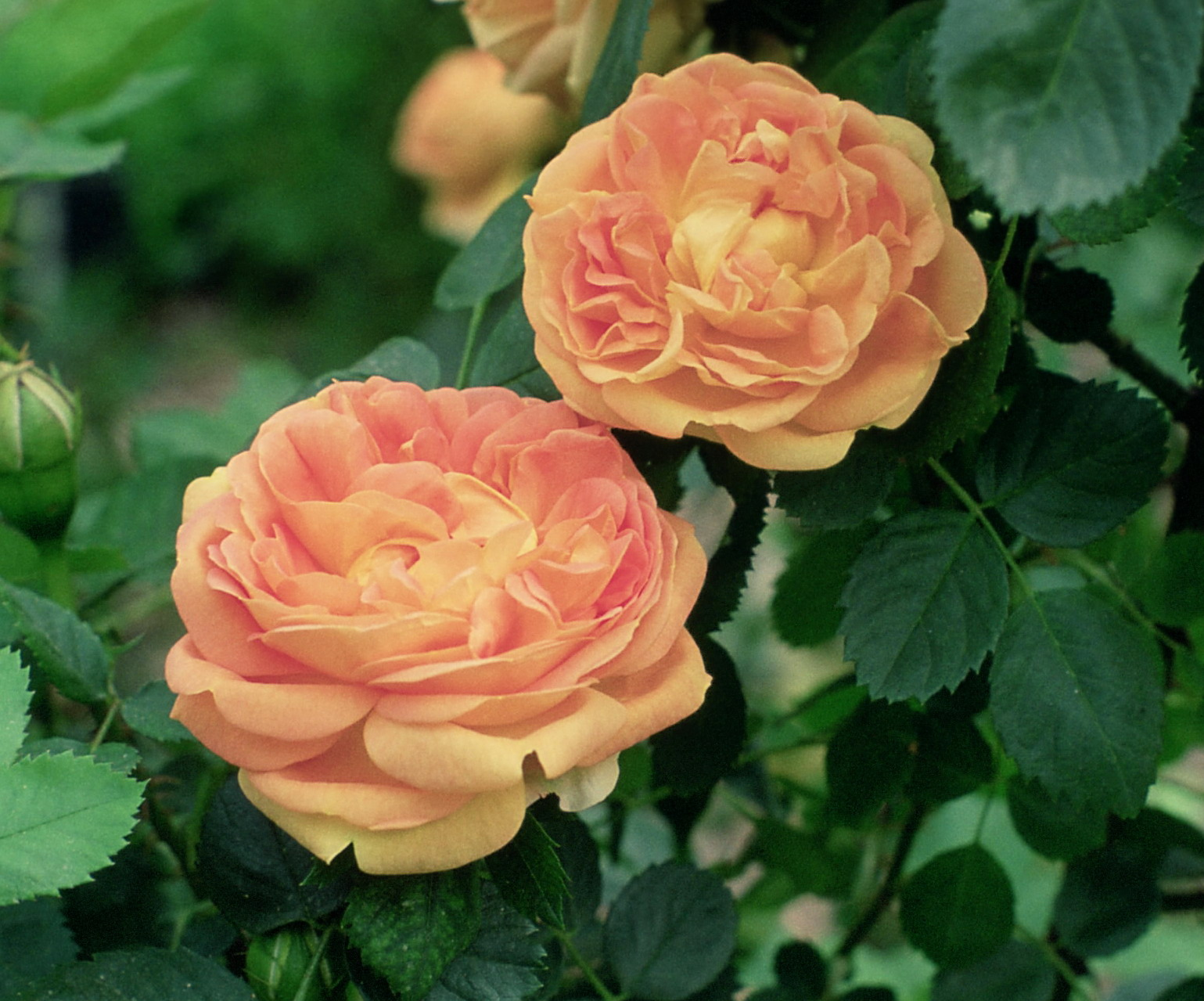
- Rosa 'Soleil d'Or'
- Genus: Rosa hybrid
- Hybrid parentage: self pollinated seedling of 'Antoine Ducher' x RRosa foetida
- Cultivar group: Fetida hybrid (Pernetiana)
- Marketing names: 'Soleil d'Or', 'Goldsonne'
- Breeder: Joseph Pernet-Ducher
- Origin: France, 1900

Rosa 'Soleil d'Or' is a Foetida hybrid rose cultivar, bred by Joseph Pernet-Ducher and introduced on November 1, 1900. It is the ancestor of all modern Hybrid tea roses and the first yellow-orange rose. Pernet-Ducher later crossed 'Soleil d'Or' with Tea roses to create a new class known as Pernetiana roses.

== Description ==
'Soleil d'Or' is a vigorous, upright Foetida hybrid rose, 3 to 5 ft (90–150 cm) in height, with a 3 ft (90 cm) spread. The flowers are large with a flat, cup-shaped form. Flowers are borne singly or in small clusters. Bloom size is 2.4 in (6 cm) on average. 'Soleil d'Or' has a strong, spicy fragrance. The flower color is a blend of orange, yellow, apricot and pink. Orange-yellow outer petals curve inward with a pink-rose interior and a yellow reverse. The rose has strong stems covered in large, thick thorns. The plant is susceptible to blackspot and thrives in hot climates. 'Soleil d'Or' will sometime have a repeat flowering.

== History ==
=== Pernet-Ducher ===
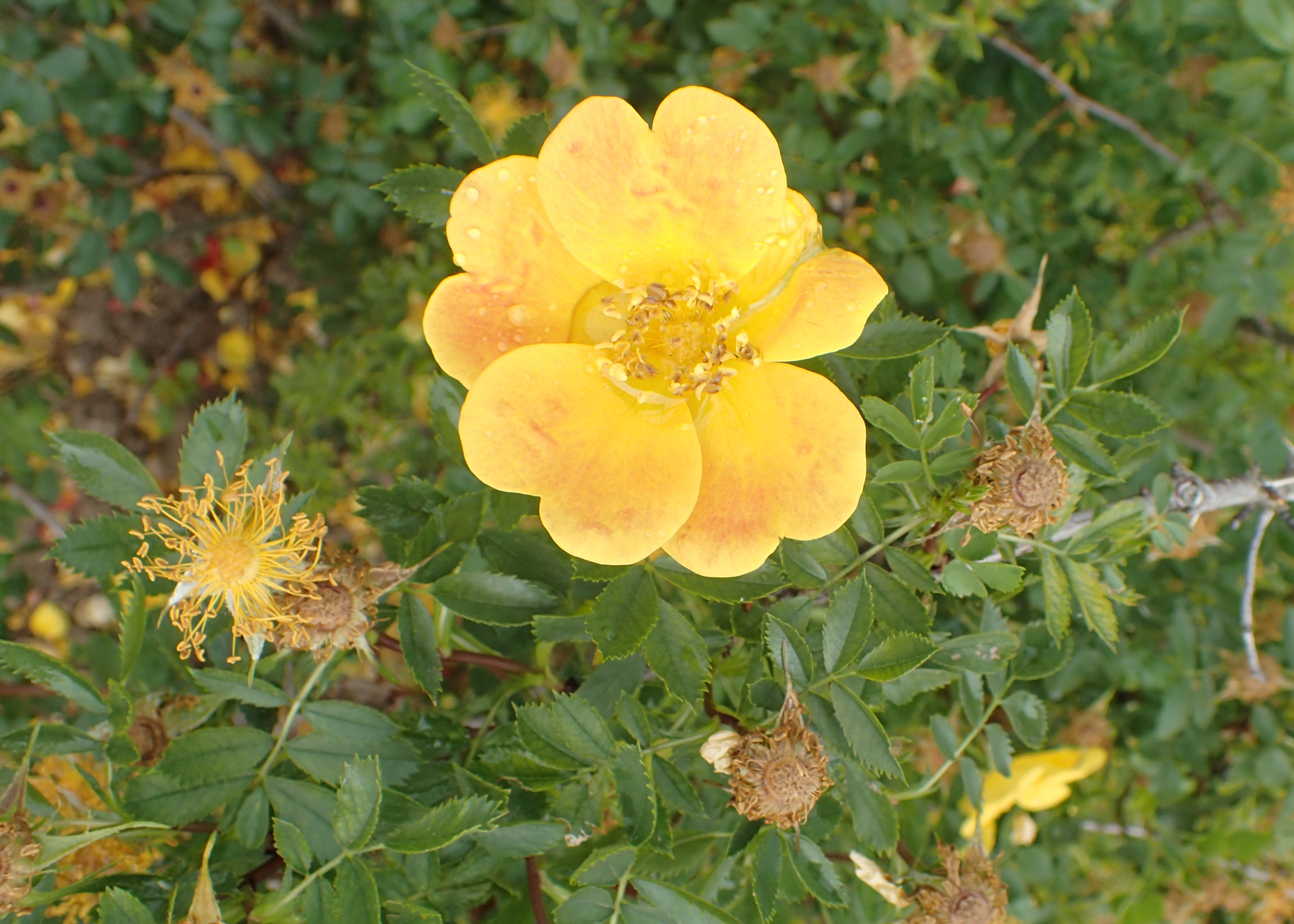
Rosa foetida

Joseph Pernet was born near Lyon, France, in 1859. His father, Jean Pernet, (1832–1896) was a successful nurseryman and a 2nd generation rosarian. Joseph worked at his father's nursery until 1879, when he was hired as an apprentice by nursery owner and rose breeder, Claude Ducher. Ducher introduced many rose cultivars in the 1800s, including the Hybrid Perpetual 'Gloire de Ducher' and two popular Tea roses, 'Marie van Hourte' (1871) and 'Anna Olivier' (1872). After Ducher's death in 1874, his widow, Marie Serlin Ducher (1834–1881) promoted Pernet to nursery foreman. Pernet married Ducher's daughter, Marie, in 1882 and took the name "Pernet-Ducher.

During the 1880s, Pernet-Ducher and Jean Pernet developed a rose breeding program to develop a new class of Hybrid teas and create a remontant, deep yellow Hybrid perpetual. The only yellow roses at the time were pale yellow or buff colored. They bred their new rose varieties using controlled pollination with great success and were able to create many popular new cultivars, including 'Madame Caroline Testout' (1890) and 'Mme Abel Chatenay' (1895).

=== 'Soleil d'Or' ===
"'This was an epoch-making rose — the first hardy repeat-flowering orange-yellow rose. Every modern yellow rose owes its coloring to Pernet-Ducher's cross."

— Quest-Ritson, 2011.

In 1887, Pernet-Ducher and Pernet crossed the red Hybrid perpetual, 'Antoine Ducher' with Rosa foetida, which Pernet-Ducher selected for its bright, long-lasting yellow color. One seedling survived the hybridization process and was planted in Pernet-Ducher's garden. Two years later, he noticed a new seedling growing alongside the original Foetida hybrid planting. It grew to be an exceptional floriferous rose with large blooms and a unique and beautiful blended color of pink, peach, yellow, and apricot. He named the seedling 'Soleil d'Or' (golden sun).

After Jean Pernet died in 1896, Pernet-Ducher continued their rose breeding program. He introduced 'Soleil d'Or' on November 1, 1900. All modern yellow roses are descended from this cultivar, which is the first of the Pernetiana rose class and the ancestor of all modern Hybrid tea roses. 'Soleil d'Or' was not the peak of Pernet-Ducher's career. He continued to develop new roses, crossing 'Soleil d'Or' with hardy Tea roses, with the goal of improving hardiness, flowering and the introduction of new color varieties. During his long career, Pernet-Ducher created an entirely new color range of roses, which included bright yellow, apricot, copper, new orange shades, lavender, new blended colors and bicolors.

== Child plants ==
- Rosa 'Madame Edouard Herriot', (Pernet-Ducher, 1907)
- Rosa 'Arthur R. Goodwin', sport, (Pernet-Ducher, 1909)
- Rosa 'Juliet' (Easles & Paul, 1910)
- Rosa 'Rayon d'Or', (Pernet-Ducher, 1910)
- Rosa 'Rosa 'Louise Catherine Breslau', (Pernet-Ducher, 1912)

== Sources ==
- Dickerson, Brent C (1992). The Old Rose Advisor. Portland, Oregon: Timber Press. ISBN 978-0-88192-216-5.
- Quest-Ritson, Brigid; Quest-Ritson, Charles (1993). Encyclopedia of Roses. DK Publishing. ISBN 978-0756688684.
- Phillips, Roger; Rix, Martyn (1993). The Quest for the Rose. New York: Random House. ISBN 978-0-679-43573-0.
