= Rosa 'Madame Caroline Testout' =

Bright pink Hybrid tea rose

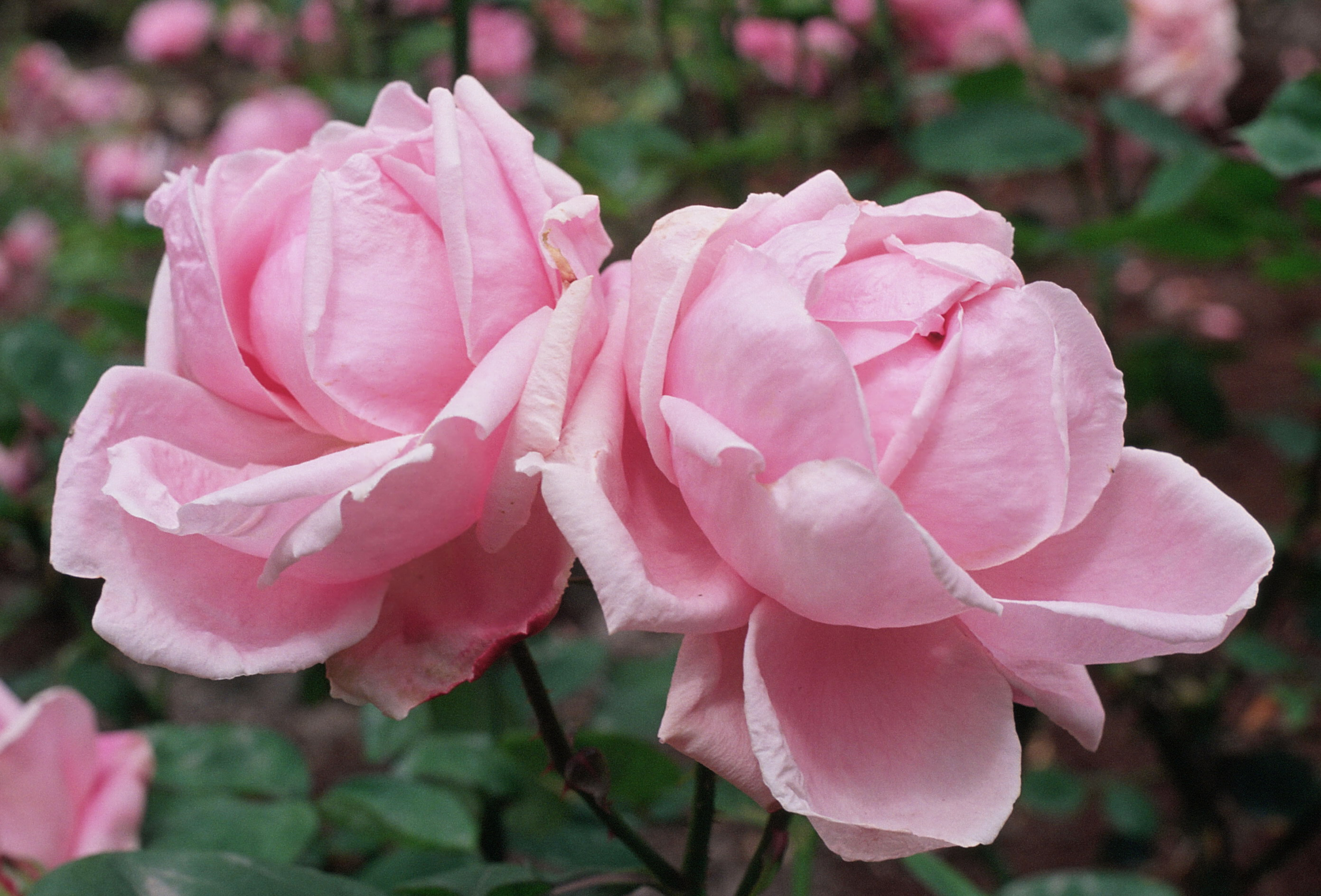
- Rosa 'Mme Caroline Testout'
- Genus: Rosa hybrid
- Hybrid parentage: 'Madame de Tartras' x 'Lady Mary Fitzwilliam'
- Cultivar group: Hybrid tea
- Marketing names: 'Madame Caroline Testout', 'Mme Caroline Testout'
- Breeder: Joseph Pernet-Ducher
- Origin: France, 1890

Rosa 'Madame Caroline Testout' is a bright pink hybrid tea rose, bred by French rosarian, Joseph Pernet-Ducher. The pink, fragrant rose has been a very popular rose worldwide since its introduction in 1890. It is recognized by the city of Portland as being an important contributor to its worldwide reputation as the "City of Roses"

== Description ==
'Madame Caroline Testout' is a hybrid tea rose, 3 to 4 ft (91–121 cm) in height, with a 2 to 3 ft (60–90 cm) spread. The flowers are large and globular in form with many short, wide petals (26-40) that curl back at the edges. 'Mme. Caroline Testout' has a strong, sweet fragrance. The flower color is medium-pink with a darker reverse. Flowers are borne singly or in clusters of 3 to 5 and bloom in flushes from spring to fall. Flowers also withstand rain well.Leaves are large and round and medium green in color.

== History ==
=== Pernet-Ducher ===
Joseph Pernet was born near Lyon, France, in 1859. His father, Jean Pernet, (1832-1896) was a successful nurseryman and a 2nd generation rosarian. Joseph worked at his father's nursery until 1879, when he was hired as an apprentice by nursery owner and rose breeder, Claude Ducher. Ducher introduced many rose cultivars in the 1800s, including the Hybrid Perpetual 'Gloire de Ducher' and two popular Tea roses, 'Marie van Hourte' (1871) and 'Anna Olivier' (1872). After Ducher's death in 1874, his widow, Marie Serlin Ducher (1834-1881) promoted Pernet to nursery foreman. Pernet married Ducher's daughter, Marie, in 1882 and took the name "Pernet-Ducher.

During the 1880s, Pernet-Ducher and Jean Pernet developed a rose breeding program to develop a new class of Hybrid teas and create a remontant, deep yellow Hybrid perpetual. The only yellow roses at the time were pale yellow or buff colored. They bred their new rose varieties using controlled pollination with great success and were able to create many popular new cultivars, including 'Madame Caroline Testout' (1890) and 'Mme Abel Chatenay' (1895).

"This must once have been the most popular rose in the world. 'Madame Caroline Testout' was planted in such quantities along the sidewalks of Portland, Oregon that it became known as 'America's Rose City'"

— Quest-Ritson, 2011.

In 1887, Pernet-Ducher and Pernet crossed the red Hybrid perpetual, 'Antoine Ducher' with Rosa foetida, which Pernet-Ducher selected for its bright, long-lasting yellow color. One seedling survived the hybridization process and was planted in Pernet-Ducher's garden. Two years later, he noticed a new seedling growing alongside the original Foetida hybrid planting. It grew to be an exceptional floriferous rose with large blooms and a unique and beautiful blended color of pink, peach, yellow, and apricot. He named the seedling 'Soleil d'Or' (golden sun).

After Jean Pernet died in 1896, Pernet-Ducher continued their rose breeding program. He introduced 'Soleil d'Or' on November 1, 1900. All modern yellow roses are descended from this cultivar, which is the first of the Pernetiana rose class and the ancestor of all modern Hybrid tea roses. 'Soleil d'Or' was not the peak of Pernet-Ducher's career. He continued to develop new roses, crossing 'Soleil d'Or' with many hardy Tea roses, with the goal of improving hardiness, flowering and the introduction of new color varieties. During his long career, Pernet-Ducher created an entirely new range of rose colors, introducing bright yellows, apricots, copper, new orange shades, lavender, new blended colors and bicolors.

=== 'Madame Caroline Testout' ===
'Mme Caroline Testout' was bred by Pernet-Ducher in 1890 by crossing the light pink tea roses, 'Madame de Tartas' and 'Lady Mary Fitzwilliam'. The rose was named after Madame Caroline Testout, a late 19th-century French dressmaker from Grenoble, and the owner of fashionable salons in London and Paris. To gain publicity for her salon businesses, Madame Testout asked Perner-Ducher to name one of his new roses after her. The new rose was first introduced at Madame Testout salon's 1890 spring fashion show. It was very popular in both Europe and the United States, receiving wide acclaim for its floriferous and satiny, rose-pink flowers. In Portland, Oregon in the early 1900s, 'Mme Caroline Testout' shrubs were planted in the hundreds of thousands along its city streets. This rose is recognized by the city of Portland as being an important contributor to its worldwide reputation as the "City of Roses".

== Child plants ==
'Madame Caroline Testout' was used to hybridize the following plants:

- Rosa 'Enchantress', child, (Cook, 1903 )
- Rosa 'Madame Edouard Herriot', child, (Pernet-Duchet, before 1912 )
- Rosa 'Wife of Bath', child, (Austin, 1969 )
- Rosa 'Frau Karl Druschki', child, (Lambert, 1901) )

== Sources ==
- Dickerson, Brent C (1992). The Old Rose Advisor. Portland, Oregon: Timber Press. ISBN 978-0-88192-216-5.
- Phillips, Roger; Rix, Martyn (1993). The Quest for the Rose. New York: Random House. ISBN 978-0-679-43573-0.
- Quest-Ritson, Brigid; Quest-Ritson, Charles (1993). Encyclopedia of Roses. DK Publishing. ISBN 978-0756688684.
