= Rosa 'Baroness Rothschild' =

Pink Hybrid Perpetual rose, Pernet 1868

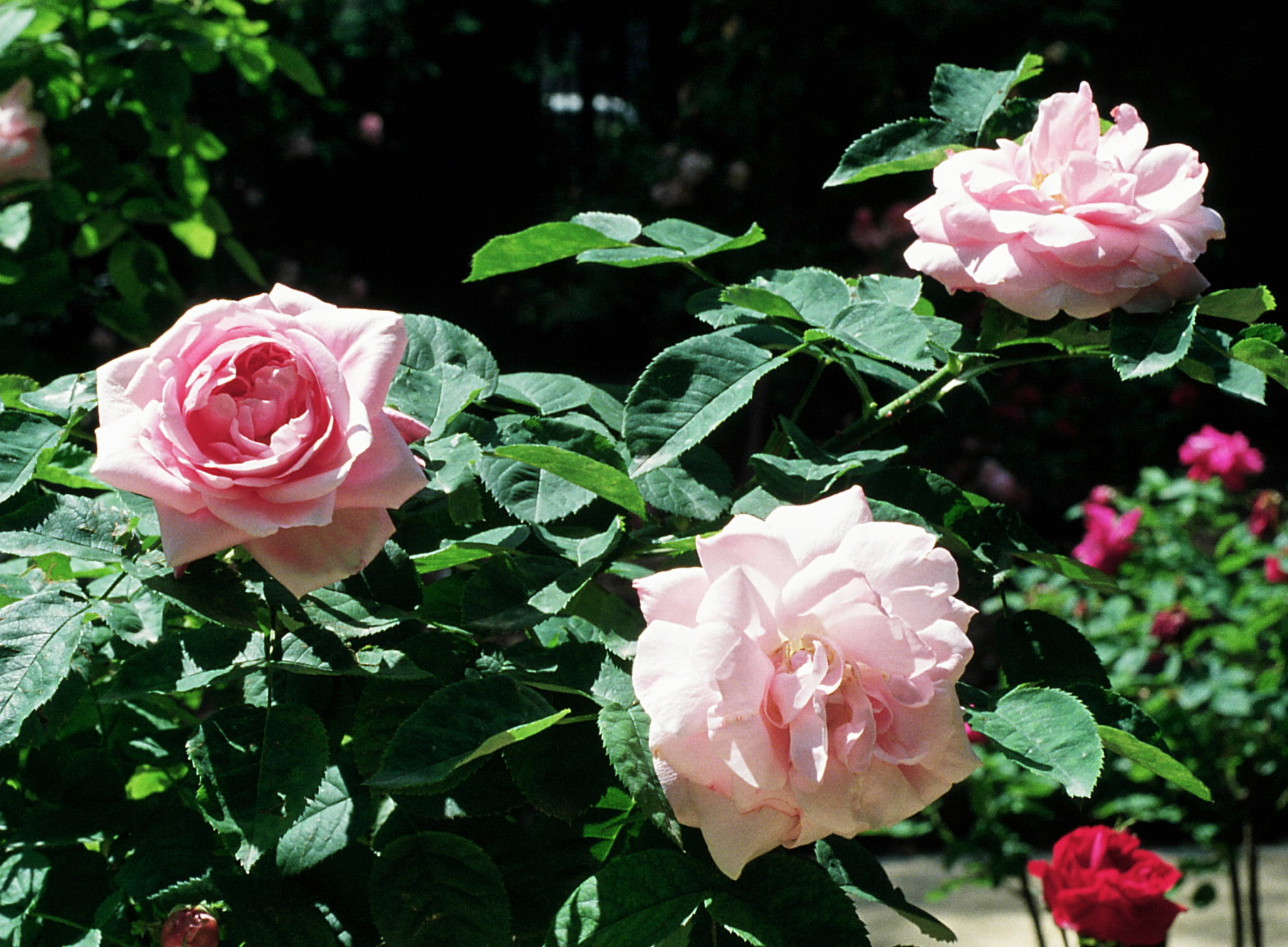
- Rosa 'Baroness Rothschild'
- Genus: Rosa hybrid
- Hybrid parentage: seedling of 'Souvenir de la Reine d'Angleterre'
- Cultivar group: Hybrid Perpetual
- Marketing names: 'Baroness Rothschild' 'Baronne de Rothschild' 'Baronne Adolph de Rothschild'
- Breeder: Jean Pernet
- Origin: France, 1868

Rosa 'Baroness Rothchild' is a pink Hybrid Perpetual rose cultivar, bred by Jean Pernet in 1868 and introduced in Australia by St. Kilda Nurseries in 1873 as 'Baroness Rothschild'.

== Description ==
'Baroness Rothschild' is a tall, bushy Hybrid Perpetual rose, 4 to 6 ft (1.2–1.8 m) in height, with a 3 to 4 ft (0.91–1.22 m) spread. The flowers are double (17–25 petals) and have a cupped, globular bloom form. Bloom color is medium-pink, lighter pink at the edges and dark pink in the center. Petals have a glossy shine that is fairly unique. The plant is typically late to flower. Flowers are carried singly on long stems or in small clusters of 2–3. Bloom size is very large, 4 to 6 in (100 to 150 mm), on average. 'Baroness Rothschild' has a moderate, tea fragrance and large, grey-green leaves. The plant is susceptible to mildew. 'Baroness Rothschild' will occasionally re-bloom later in the season.

== History ==
=== Jean Pernet ===
Jean Claude Pernet (1832-1896) was a French nurseryman and rose breeder from Lyon. He is best known for developing Hybrid Perpetual and Bourbon rose varieties, including 'Baroness Rothchild' (1868), 'Louis Gimard' (1877), 'Merveille de Lyon (1882), and 'Triomphe des Noisettes' (1887). His father, Claude Pernet, and son Joseph Pernet-Ducher were also prominent nursery owners and rose breeders in Lyon.

Pernet and his son, Joseph, worked together in the 1880s to develop a bright yellow, repeat flowering Hybrid perpetual. Light yellow and buff colored Tea roses and Noisettes were the only yellow shades available in the late 19th century. Their breeding process involved the use of controlled pollination, a method not commonly used at the time. After Jean Pernet's death in 1896, Pernet-Ducher continued their work and later introduced 'Soleil d'Or' in 1900. 'Soleil d'Or' initiated a new class of tea roses known as Pernetiana roses and is considered the ancestor of the modern Hybrid tea rose.

=== 'Baroness Rothchild' ===
Pernet developed 'Baroness Rothschild' from a seedling of the medium pink Hybrid Perpetual, 'Souvenir de la Reine d'Angleterre' (Cochet, 1855). The rose cultivar was originally named, 'Baronne Adolphe de Rothschild', after a wealthy banker's wife. The rose was introduced in Australia by George Brunning of St. Kilda Nurseries in 1873 as 'Baroness Rothschild'. The cultivar was used to develop three child plants.

== Child plants ==
- 'Baronne Nathaniel de Rothschild', (Pernet, 1881)
- 'Debutante', (Walsh, 1901)
- 'Mabel Morrison', sport, (Discovered by Joseph Broughton, 1878)

== Sources ==
- Dickerson, Brent C (1992). The Old Rose Advisor. Portland, Oregon: Timber Press. ISBN 978-0-88192-216-5.
- Quest-Ritson, Brigid; Quest-Ritson, Charles (2003). Encyclopedia of Roses. DK Publishing. ISBN 978-0756688684.
- Phillips, Roger; Rix, Martyn (1993). The Quest for the Rose. New York: Random House. ISBN 978-0-679-43573-0.
