= Rosa 'Souvenir de Claudius Pernet' =

Yellow hybrid tea rose cultivar

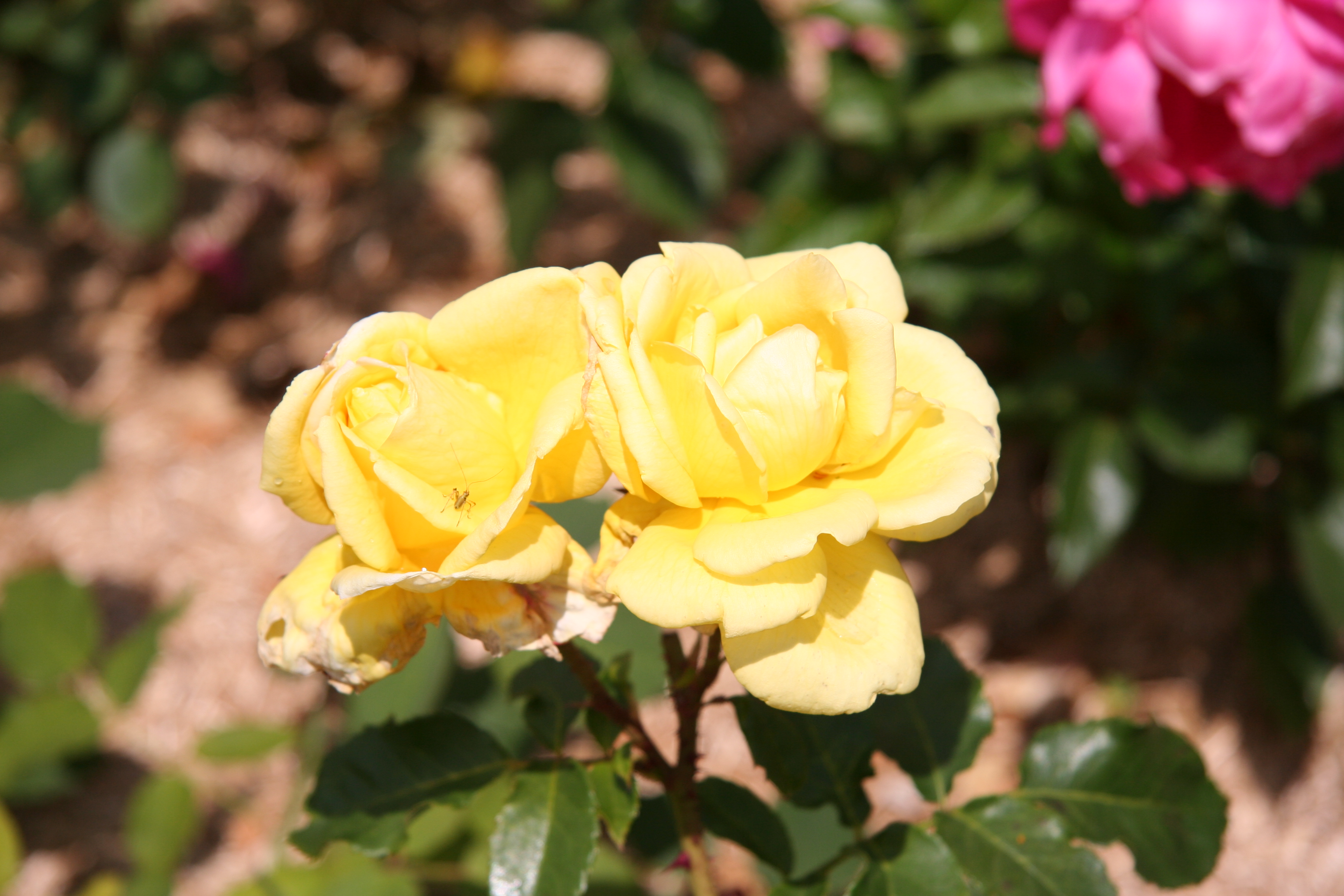
- 'Souvenir de Claudius Pernet'
- Genus: Rosa hybrid
- Hybrid parentage: 'Constance' × Unnamed seedling
- Cultivar group: Hybrid tea
- Breeder: Joseph Pernet-Ducher
- Origin: France, 1920

Rosa 'Souvenir de Claudius Pernet' is a medium yellow Hybrid tea rose, bred by French rose breeder, Joseph Pernet-Ducher before 1919. He named the rose for his son Claudius, who was killed in action in World War I. 'Souvenir de Claudius Pernet' is one of the ancestors of the famous 'Peace' rose.

== Description ==
'Souvenir de Claudius Pernet' is a medium yellow hybrid tea rose with large, full (26-40) petals, born mostly solitary. Buds are large and pointed and open to flowers that are medium yellow or golden with a dark yellow center. The rose has a mild fragrance and has dark green glossy foliage. The shrub blooms in flushes throughout the summer.

== History ==
=== Pernet-Ducher ===
Joseph Pernet was born near Lyon, France, in 1859. His father, Jean Pernet, (1832-1896) was a successful nurseryman and a 2nd generation rosarian. Joseph worked at his father's nursery until 1879, when he was hired as an apprentice by nursery owner and rose breeder, Claude Ducher. Ducher introduced many rose cultivars in the 1800s, including the Hybrid Perpetual 'Gloire de Ducher' and two popular Tea roses, 'Marie van Hourte' (1871) and 'Anna Olivier' (1872). After Ducher's death in 1874, his widow, Marie Serlin Ducher (1834-1881) promoted Pernet to nursery foreman. Pernet married Ducher's daughter, Marie, in 1882 and took the name "Pernet-Ducher.

During the 1880s, Pernet-Ducher and Jean Pernet developed a rose breeding program to develop a new class of Hybrid teas and create a remontant, deep yellow Hybrid perpetual. The only yellow roses at the time were pale yellow or buff colored. They bred their new rose varieties using controlled pollination with great success and were able to create many popular new cultivars, including 'Madame Caroline Testout' (1890) and 'Mme Abel Chatenay' (1895).

In 1887, Pernet-Ducher and Pernet crossed the red Hybrid perpetual, 'Antoine Ducher' with Rosa foetida, which Pernet-Ducher selected for its bright, long-lasting yellow color. One seedling survived the hybridization process and was planted in Pernet-Ducher's garden. Two years later, he noticed a new seedling growing alongside the original Foetida hybrid planting. It grew to be an exceptional floriferous rose with large blooms and a unique and beautiful blended color of pink, peach, yellow, and apricot. He named the seedling 'Soleil d'Or' (golden sun).

=== 'Souvenir de Claudius Pernet' ===
'Souvenir de Claudius Pernet' was named in honor of Pernet-Ducher's son Claudius who was killed in action in World War I. Pernet-Ducher created the rose by crossing Pernetiana 'Constance' with an unnamed seedling. 'Souvenir de Claudius Pernet' was used to hybridize the following rose varieties: 'Ambassador', 'Amelia Earhart', 'Angel Guimara', 'Autumn', 'Condesa de Sastago', 'Duquesa de Penaranda', 'Gruss an Coburg', 'Irene Churruca', 'Julien Potin', 'Mrs. Pierre S. duPont', 'Oratam', 'Peace', 'President Herbert Hoover', 'Soeur Therese', and 'Talisman'.

== Sources ==
- Dickerson, Brent C (1992). The Old Rose Advisor. Portland, Oregon: Timber Press. ISBN 978-0-88192-216-5.
- Phillips, Roger; Rix, Martin (1993). Quest for the Rose: A Historical Guide to Roses. Random House. ISBN 978-0679435730.
- Quest-Ritson, Brigid; Quest-Ritson, Charles (1993). Encyclopedia of Roses. DK Publishing. ISBN 978-0756688684.
