= Joseph Pernet-Ducher =

French rose breeder (1859–1928)

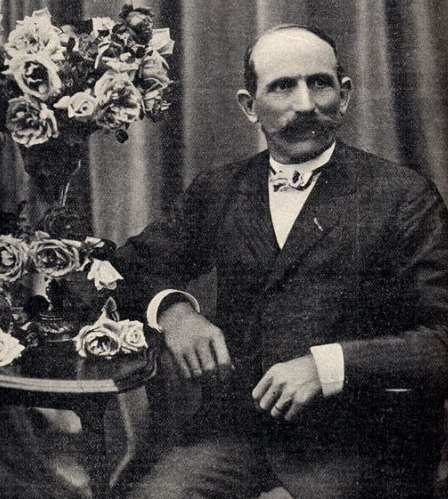
Joseph Pernet-Ducher, 1925

Joseph Pernet-Ducher (1859–1928) was a French rose breeder who is recognized for his work in the development of the modern Hybrid tea rose. Pernet and his father, Jean Pernet, worked together in the 1880s to develop the first yellow remontant Hybrid perpetual rose. After Jean Pernet's death in 1896, Pernet-Ducher continued their work and later introduced 'Soleil d'Or' in 1900. 'Soleil d'Or' initiated a new class of tea roses known as Pernetiana roses and is considered the ancestor of the modern Hybrid tea rose.

== Biography ==
=== Early life ===
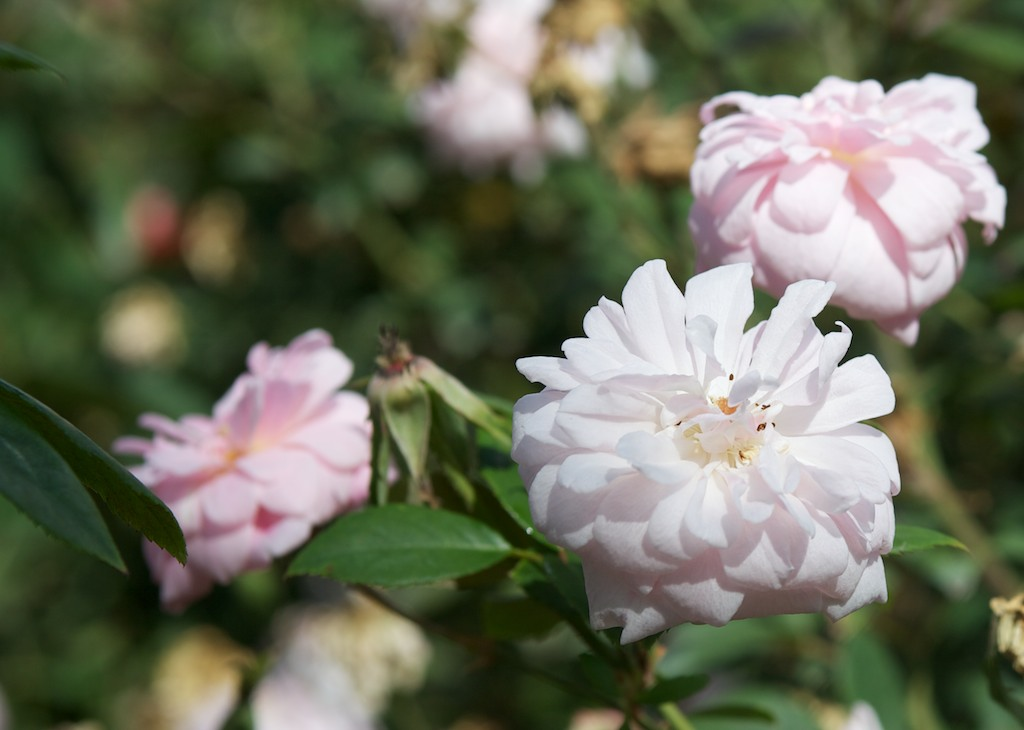
'Cécile Brunner' 1881

Joseph Pernet was born near Lyon, France, in 1859. His father, Jean Pernet, (1832-1896) owned a successful rose nursery and was a 2nd generation rosarian. Jean Perner is best known for breeding the Hybrid Perpetual rose 'Baronne Adolphe de Rothchild' (1868) and the Moss rose 'Louis Gimard' (1877). Joseph worked at his father's nursery until 1879 when he was hired as an apprentice by nursery owner, Claude Ducher. Ducher introduced many new rose cultivars in the 1800s, including the Hybrid Perpetual 'Gloire de Ducher' and two popular Tea roses, 'Marie van Hourte' (1871) and 'Anna Olivier' (1872). After Ducher's death in 1874, his widow, Marie Serlin Ducher (1834-1881), continued to manage the nursery and promoted Pernet to nursery foreman. Marie Ducher died in February, 1881. Pernet married Ducher's daughter, Marie, in 1882 and took the name "Pernet-Ducher. His first rose introduction, 'Cécile Brunner', was bred by Claude's widow, Marie, before 1880.

== Rose breeding ==
=== 1882—1900 ===
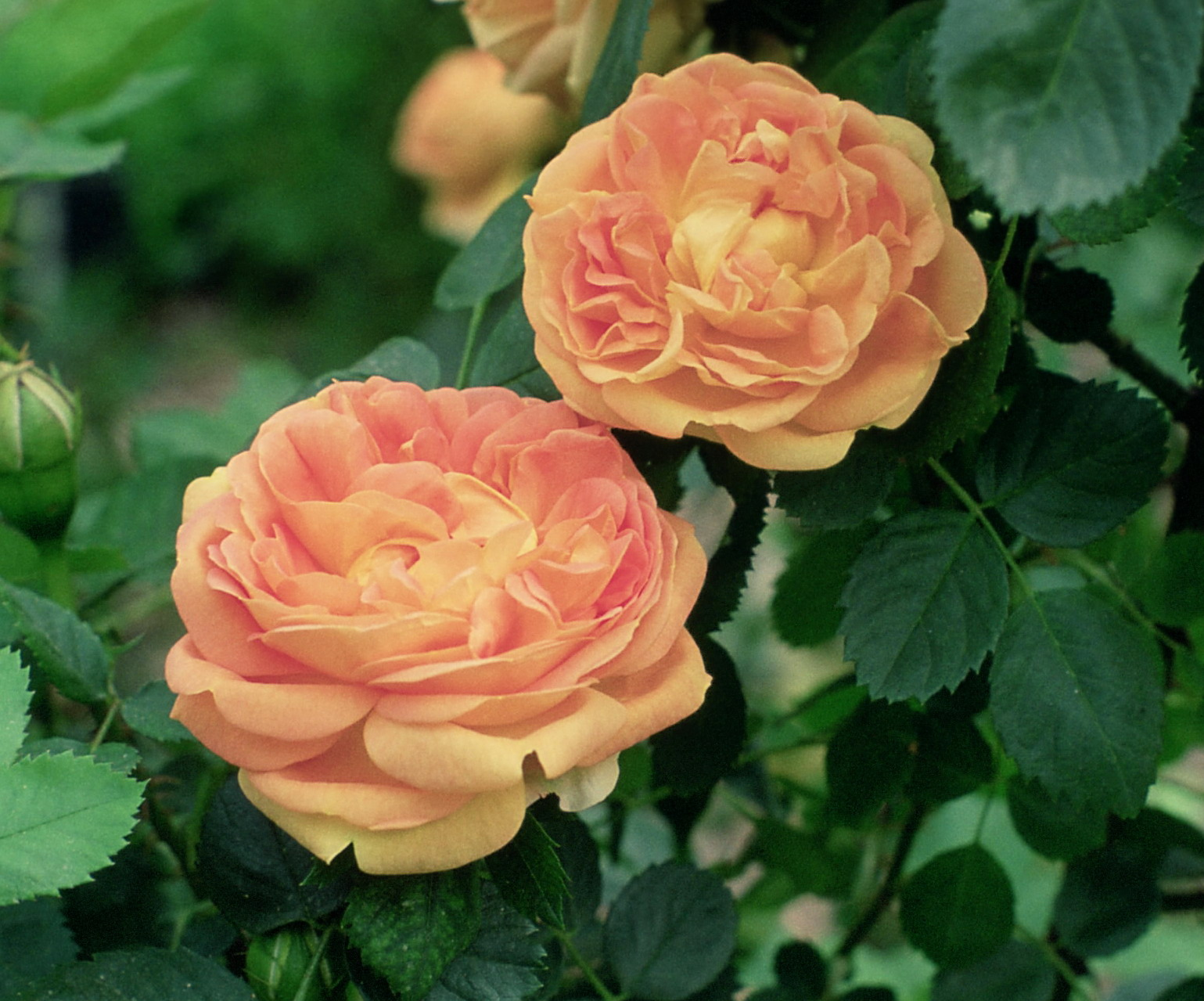
Soleil d'Or, 1900

Pernet-Ducher and his father worked together in the 1880s to develop a bright yellow, repeat flowering Hybrid perpetual. Light yellow and buff colored Tea roses and Noisettes were the yellow shades available in the late 19th century. Their breeding process involved the use of controlled pollination, a method not commonly used at the time. In 1887, the two rosarians crossed the red Hybrid perpetual, 'Antoine Ducher' with Rosa foetida, which was selected for its bright, long lasting yellow color. One seedling survived the hybridization process and was planted in Pernet-Ducher's garden. Two years later, Pernet-Ducher noticed a new seedling growing alongside the original planting. It grew to be an exceptional, floriferous rose with large blooms and a wonderful blended color of pink, peach, yellow, and apricot. Pernet-Ducher named the seedling 'Soleil d'Or'. Some of their early successes are considered to be two of the most popular of all the 19th century Hybrid tea roses: 'Madame Caroline Testout' (1890) and 'Mme Abel Chatenay' (1895).

After Jean Pernet died in 1896, Pernet-Ducher continued his rose breeding program. He introduced 'Soleil d'Or', which became known as the ancestor of the modern Hybrid Tea rose, on November 1, 1900. All modern yellow roses are descended from this cultivar. It is also known to be the first of the 'Pernetiana' rose class. 'Soleil d'Or' was not a perfect rose. Pernet-Ducher continued his rose breeding program, working to improve the hardiness and flowering of the perniatiana roses and developing new color varieties, especially beautiful yellow roses.

=== 1900—1928 ===
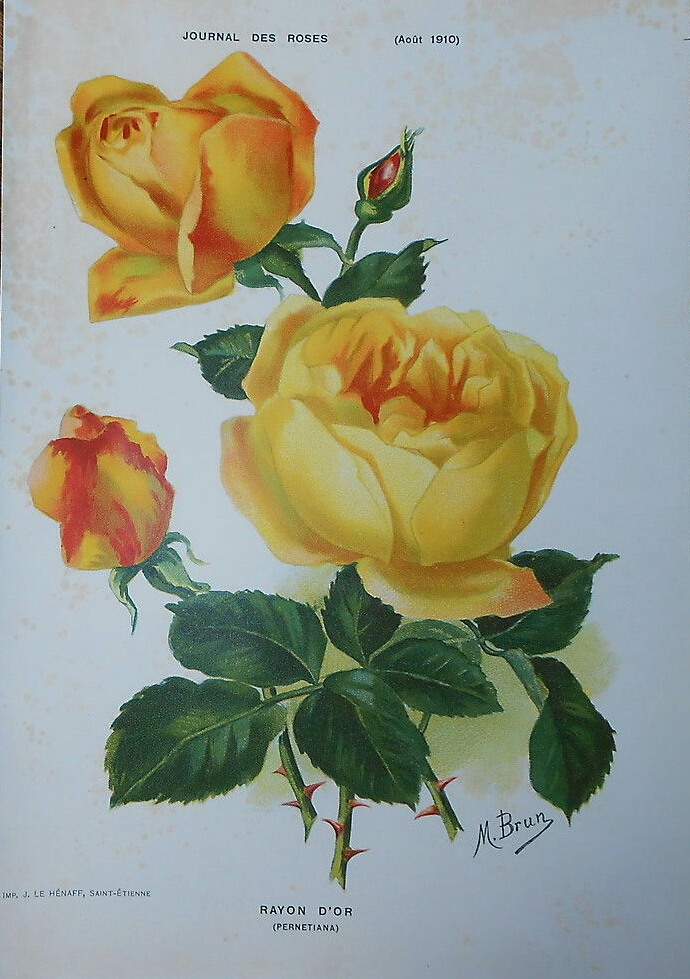
Rosa 'Rayon d'Or', 1910

In the early 20th century, Pernet-Ducher crossed his roses with selected Tea roses with great success. Some of his early Hybrid tea cultivars include the orange-pink 'Lyon Rose' (1907) and yellow 'Rayon d'Or' (1910). The Pernetiana roses were treated as a separate class of roses until 1927 when they were merged into the Hybrid Tea class. Pernet-Ducher introduced a totally new color range of roses, which included bright yellow, apricot, copper, new orange shades, lavender, new blended colors and bicolors.

Admired worldwide for his extensive knowledge of roses and rose breeding, Pernet-Ducher was known in the early 20th century as the "Wizard of Lyon." Between 1907 and 1925, Pernet-Ducher won the "Concours de Bagatelle" Gold Medal thirteen times at the international competition for new roses held each June in Paris. Pernet-Ducher's two sons, Claudius and Georges, were to manage the business when their father retired. They were both killed in action in the early years of World War I. Pernet-Ducher named the roses 'Souvenir de Claudius Pernet' and the 'Souvenir de Georges Pernet' in honor of Claudius and George. With no one to take over the family business, Joseph Pernet-Ducher later sold his nursery to Jean Gaujard in 1924. Pernet-Ducher died November 23, 1928.

== Selected roses ==
- 'Cécile Brünner', bred by Marie Veuve Ducher and introduced by Joseph Pernet-Ducher - (Polyantha) 1881
- 'Madame Caroline Testout' - (Hybrid Tea) 1890
- 'Beauté Inconstante' - (Hybrid Tea) 1892 (widow ducher)
- 'Souvenir du Président Carnot' - (Hybrid Tea) 1894
- 'Antoine Rivoire' - (Hybrid Tea) 1895
- 'Madame Abel Chatenay' - (Hybrid Tea) 1895
- 'Madame Ravary' - (Pernetiana) 1899
- 'Prince de Bulgarie' - (Hybrid Tea) 1900
- 'Soleil d'Or' - (Pernetiana) 1900
- 'Monsieur Paul Lédé' - (Hybrid Tea) (1902)
- 'Étoile de France' - (Hybrid Tea) 1904
- 'Lyon Rose' - (Pernetiana) 1907
- 'Mrs. Aaron Ward' - (Hybrid Tea) 1907
- 'Château de Clos-Vougeot' - (Hybrid Tea) 1908
- 'Mrs. Arthur Robert Waddell' - (Hybrid Tea) 1909
- 'Viscountess Enfield' (Hybrid Tea) 1910
- 'Rayon d'Or' - (Hybrid Tea) 1910
- 'Sunburst' - (Pernetiana) 1912
- 'Daily Mail Rose' - (Hybrid Tea) 1913
- 'Madame Colette Martinet' - (Hybrid Tea) 1915
- 'Souvenir de Claudius Pernet' - (Hybrid Tea) 1920
- 'Étoile de Feu' - (Pernetiana) 1921
- 'Souvenir de Georges Pernet' - (Pernetiana) 1921
- 'Souvenir de Mme. Boullet' - (Hybrid Tea) 1921
- 'Toison d'Or' - (Hybrid Tea) 1921
- 'Mrs. Herbert Stevens' - (Climbing Hybrid Tea) 1922
- 'Angèle Pernet' - (Hybrid Tea) 1924
- 'Ville de Paris' - (Pernetiana) 1925
- 'Cuba' - (Pernetiana) 1926
- 'Julien Potin' - (Hybrid Tea) 1927

== Rose gallery ==
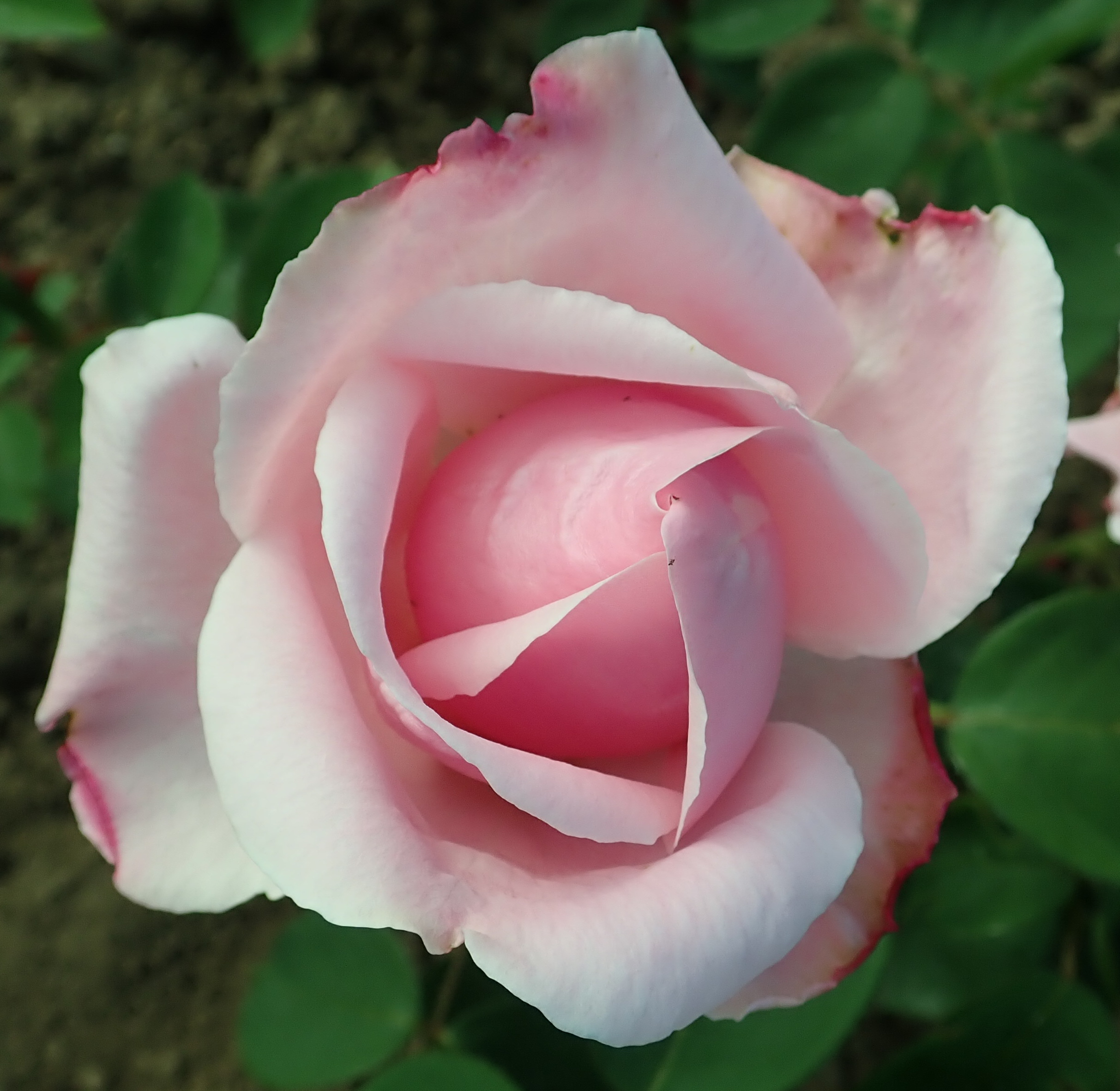
'Mme Caroline Testout' (1890)

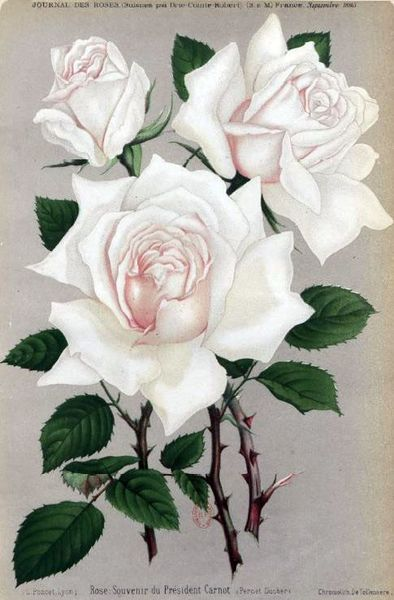
Souvenir du Président Carnot' (1894)

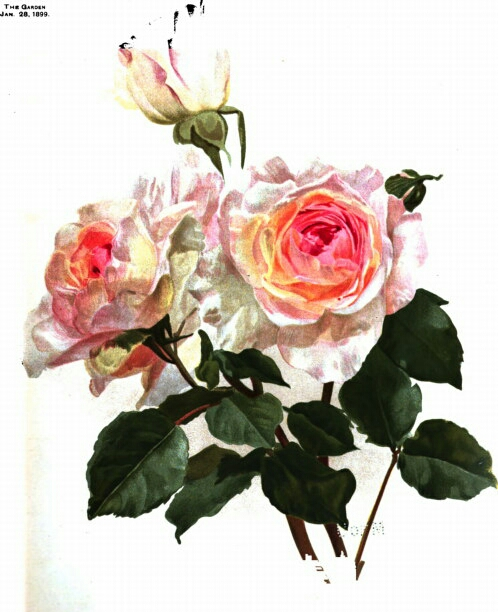
'Antoine Rivoire' (1895)

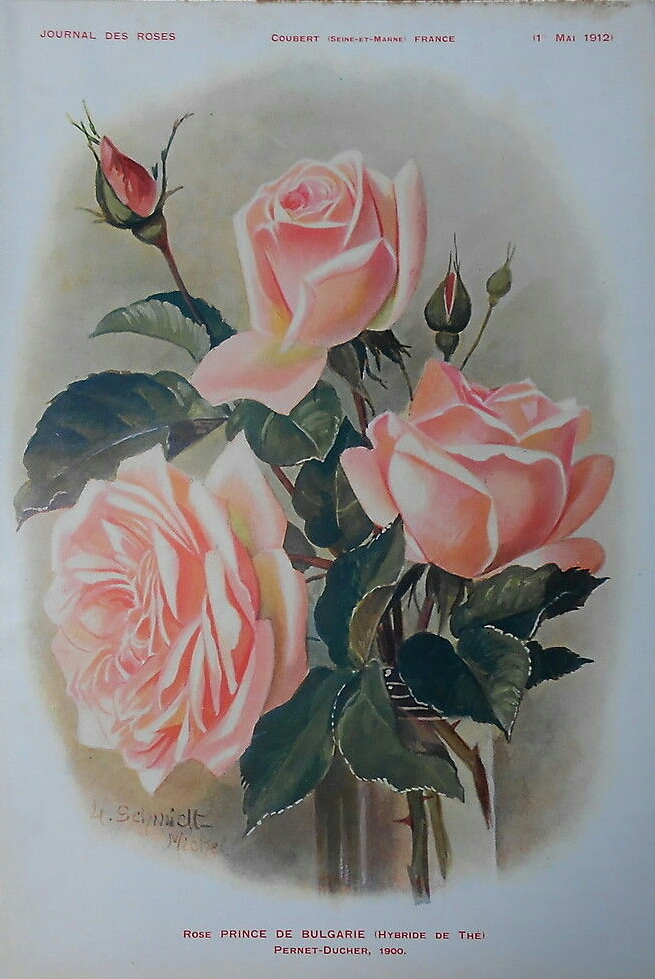
'Prince de Bulgarie' (1900)

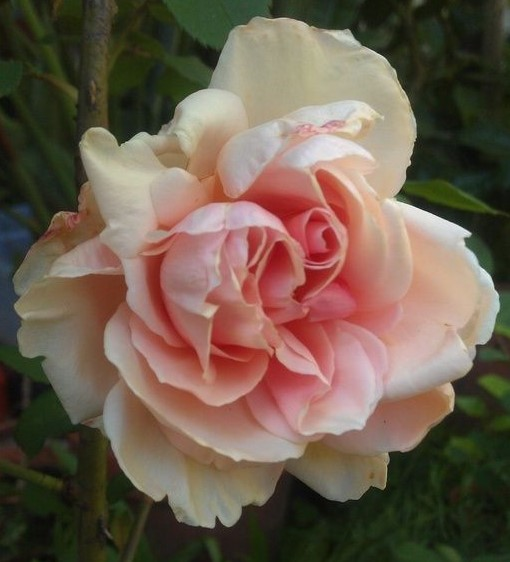
'Paul Lédé (1902)

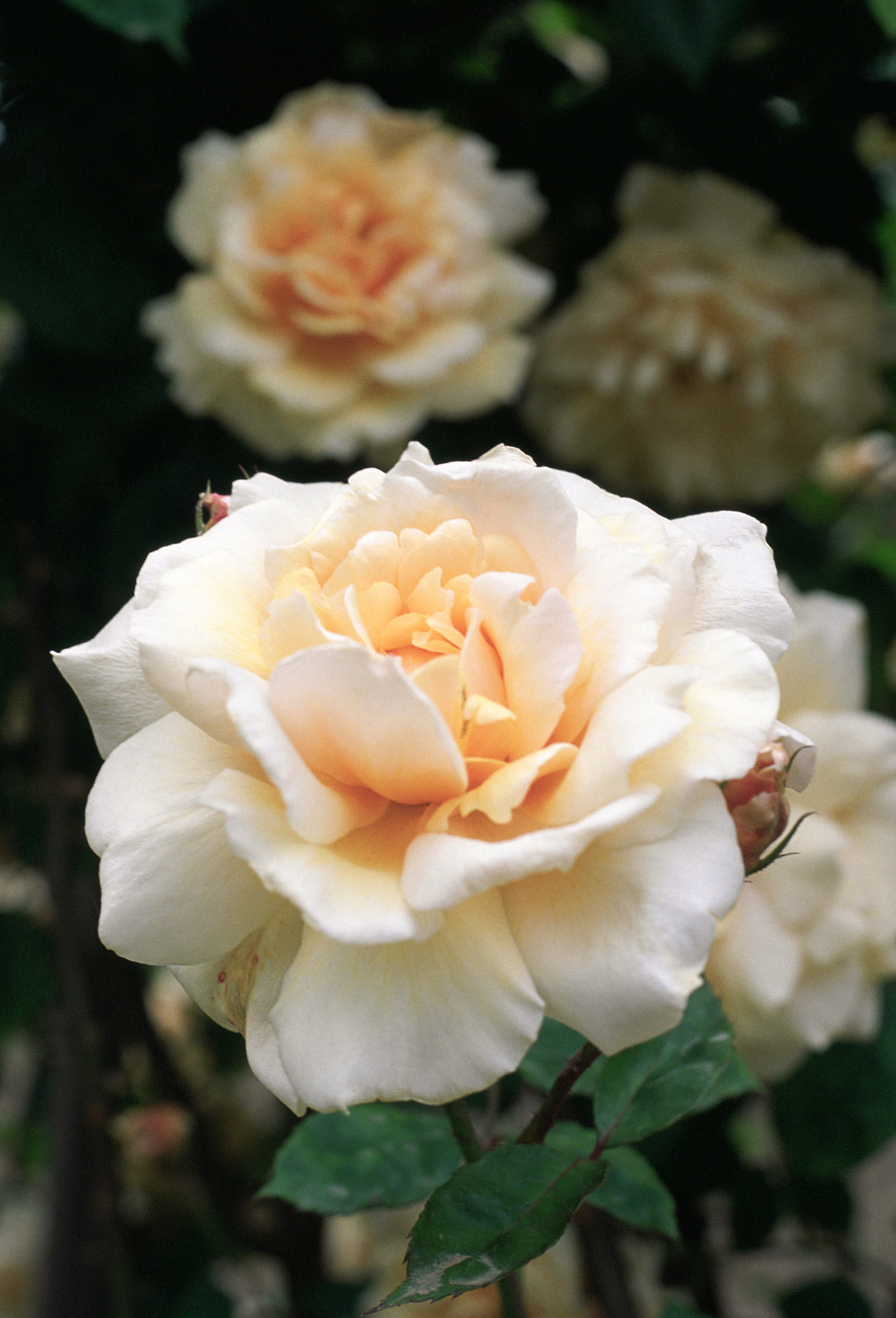
'Mrs. Aaron Ward' (1907)

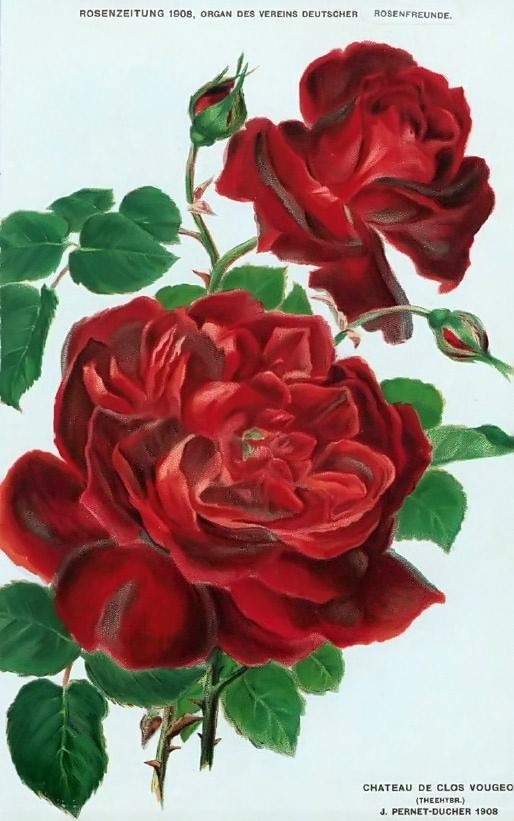
'Château de Clos-Vougeot' (1908)

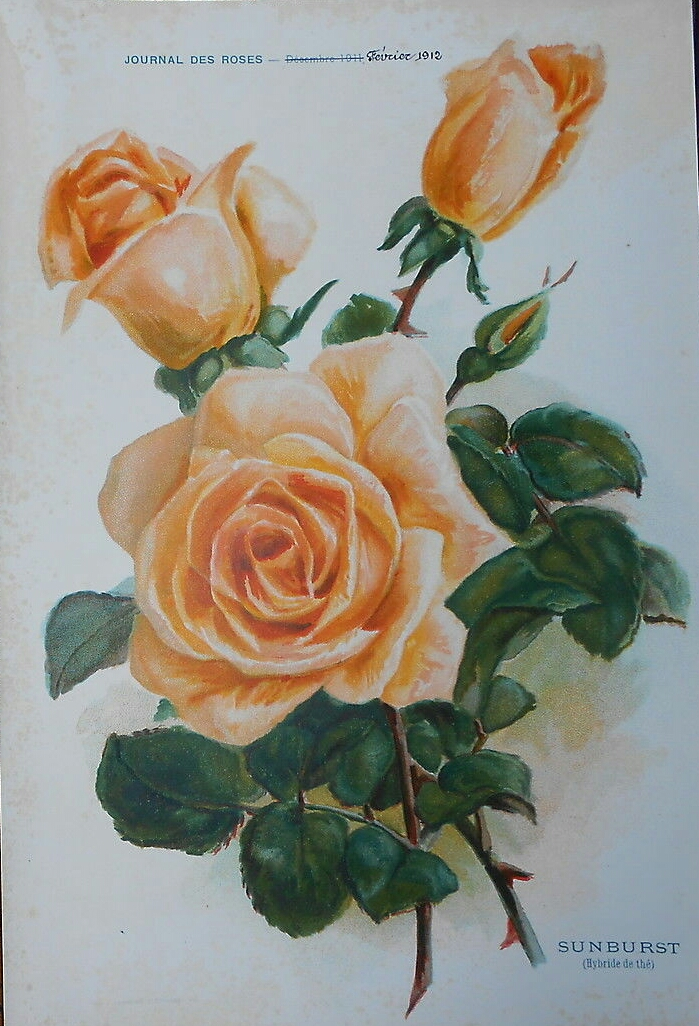
'Sunburst' (1912)

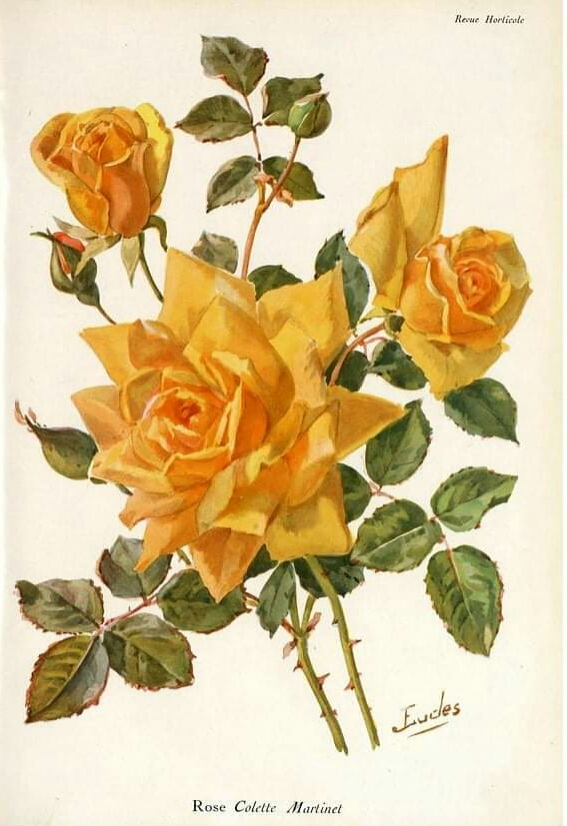
'Madame Colette Martinet' (1915)

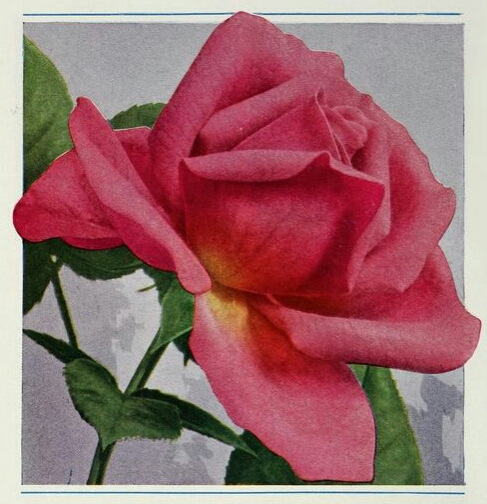
'Souvenir de Georges Pernet' (1921)

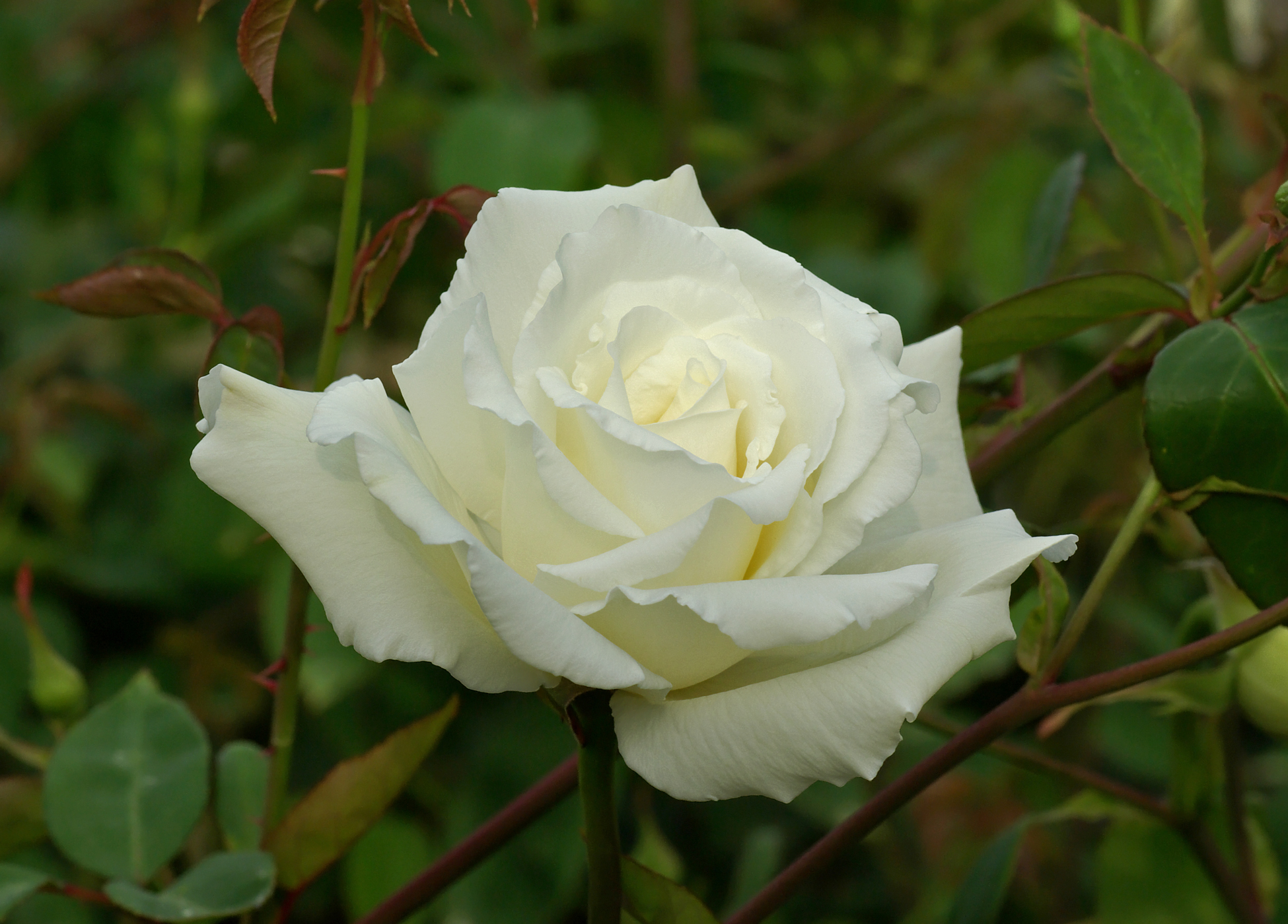
'Mrs. Herbert Stevens' (1922)

== Sources ==
Media related to Joseph Pernet-Ducher at Wikimedia Commons

- Quest-Ritson, Brigid; Quest-Ritson, Charles (1993). Encyclopedia of Roses. DK Publishing. ISBN 978-0756688684.
- Harkness, Peter (1988). Modern Garden Roses. Globe Pequot: 1988. ISBN 978-0-87106-744-9.
- Dickerson, Brent C. (2003). The Old Rose Adventurer: The Once Blooming Old European Roses, and More. Portland, Oregon: Timber Press. ISBN 978-0881924664.
- Dickerson, Brent C (1992). The Old Rose Advisor. Portland, Oregon: Timber Press. ISBN 978-0-88192-216-5.
- Phillips, Roger; Rix, Martyn (1993). The Quest for the Rose. New York: Random House. ISBN 978-0-679-43573-0.
