= Rosa 'Lilian Austin' =

Pink-blend shrub rose cultivar

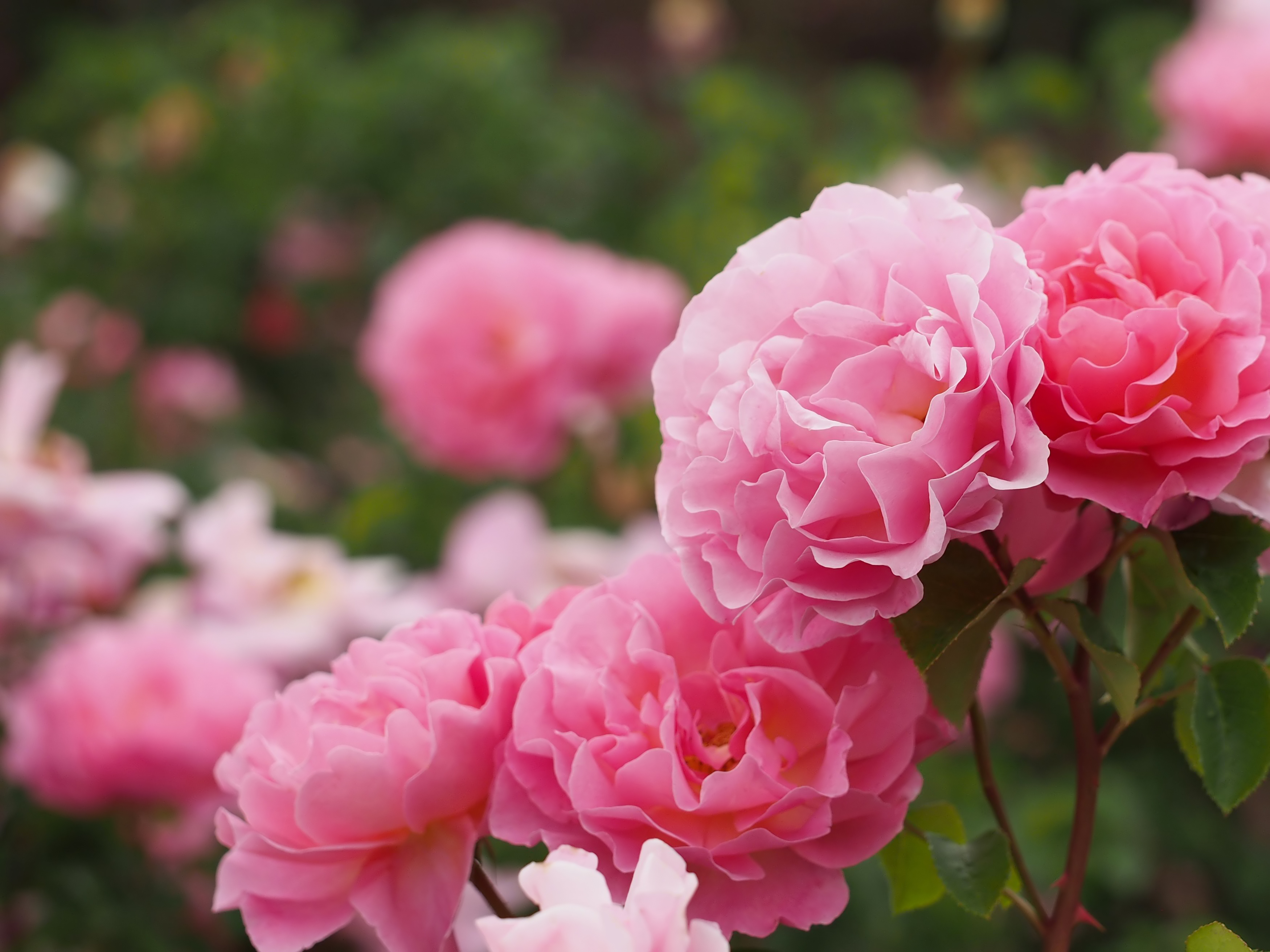
- Rosa 'Lilian Austin'
- Genus: Rosa hybrid
- Hybrid parentage: 'Aloha' x 'Yeoman'
- Cultivar group: Shrub rose
- Breeder: David C. H. Austin
- Origin: Great Britain, 1973

Rosa 'Lilian Austin' is a pink-blend Shrub rose, developed by British rose breeder and commercial nursery owner, David Austin. The rose was named for Austin's mother, Lilian and was introduced into Britain in 1973.

== Description ==
'Lilian Austin' is a medium-tall shrub rose, 3.3 to 4.5 ft (1.0–1.4 m) in height, with a 4 ft (1.2 m) spread. Blooms are large and cup shaped, with an average of 33 petals; They are borne in clusters of 3–11. Petals are ruffled in appearance. Flowers are initially medium pink with yellow centers when they open, and then fade to rose pink with a cream colored center. The rose has a moderate, fruity fragrance. and has dark green foliage. The shrub has a relaxed growth habit and is often wider than it is tall. 'Lilian Austin' blooms continuously until early winter; It requires spring and winter freeze protection.

== History ==
=== David Austin roses ===
David C. H. Austin (1926 – 2018) was an award-winning rose breeder, nursery owner and writer from Shropshire, England. He began breeding roses in the 1950s with the goal of creating new shrub rose varieties that would possess the best qualities of old-fashioned roses while incorporating the long flowering characteristics of hybrid tea roses and floribundas. His first commercially successful rose cultivar was 'Constance Spry', which he introduced in 1961. He created a new, informal class of roses in the 1960s, which he named "English Roses". Austin's roses are generally known today as "David Austin Roses". Austin attained international commercial success with his new rose varieties. Some of his most popular roses include 'Wife of Bath' (1969), 'Canterbury' (1969), and 'Abraham Darby' (1985)

=== 'Lilian Austin' ===
Austin created the rose cultivar, 'Lilian Austin', by crossing the climbing hybrid tea, 'Aloha' with the shrub rose 'Yeoman'. He named the rose his mother, Lilian and introduced the new cultivar in Britain in 1973. 'Lilian Austin' was used to hybridize nine child plants: 'Cymballine', 'English Garden', 'Othello', 'Fisherman's Friend', 'Mortimer Sackler', 'Queen Nefertiti', 'The Countryman', 'The Reeve' and 'The Prince'.

== Sources ==
- Quest-Ritson, Brigid; Quest-Ritson, Charles (1993). Encyclopedia of Roses. DK Publishing. ISBN 978-0756688684.
- Phillips, Roger; Rix, Martyn (1993). The Quest for the Rose. New York: Random House. ISBN 978-0-679-43573-0.
