= Jean Pernet =

French rose breeder (1832–1896)

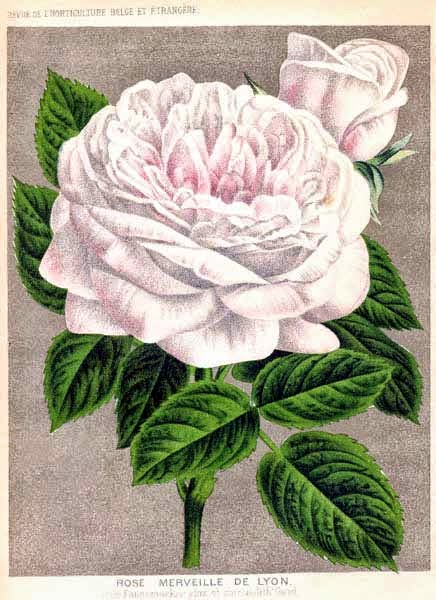
'Merveille de Lyon

Jean Claude Pernet, père (15 October 1832 in Morestel – 31 March 1896 in Lyon) was a French nurseryman and rose breeder, best known for his Hybrid Perpetual and Bourbon rose varieties. His most popular roses include 'Baroness Rothschild' (1868), 'Merveille de Lyon (1882), and 'Triomphe des Noisettes' (1887). His father, Claude Pernet, and son Joseph Pernet-Ducher were also influential nursery owners and rose breeders.

== Biography ==
=== Early life ===
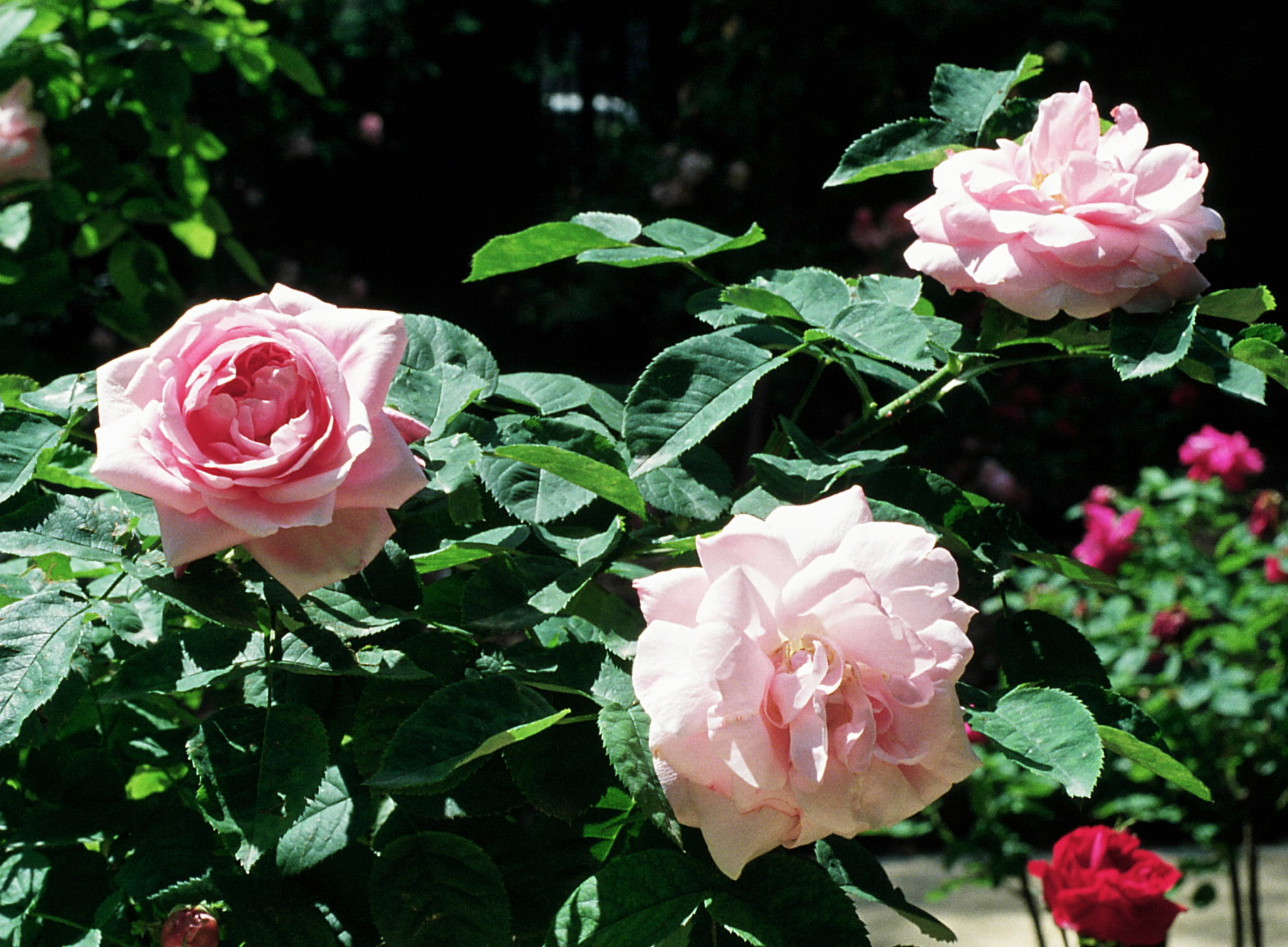
'Baroness de Rothschild'

Jean Claude Pernet was born on October 15, 1832, in the village of Passin, in the commune of Morestel, in southeastern France. Pernet's father, Claude Pernet, was a nurseryman who began growing roses in 1845. He is best known for establishing the world’s first rose exhibition in Lyon. Jean showed a strong interest in horticulture at an early age. He first worked for the nurseryman, Normande in La Côte-Saint-André.

Pernet later returned to Lyon in 1855 to work for Jean-Baptiste André Guillot, (known as "Guillot Père"), to learn how to grow roses. He worked at the Guillot nursery from 1853 to 1855. Wanting to further his knowledge and skill with roses, Pernet then went to work for rose grower, Pierre-Hubert Portemer and later for the highly respected rosarian, Victor Verdier in Paris. Pernet moved back to Lyon in 1856 and returned to the Guillot nursery, working for Guillot's son, known as " Guillot Fils".

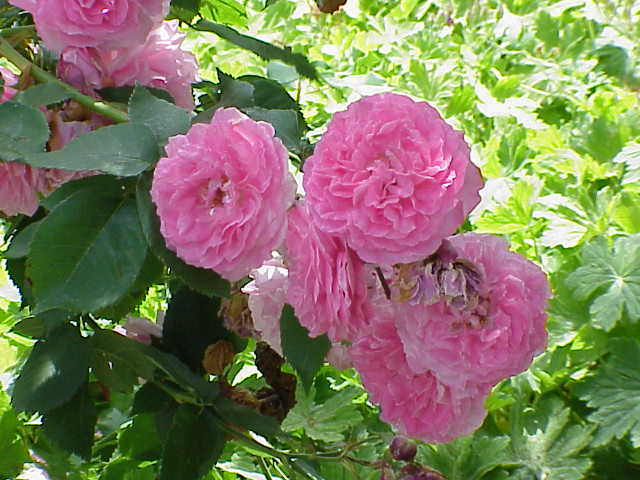
'Prince Napoléon'

=== Nurseryman and rose grower ===
In 1857, Pernet established his nursery. He sold his first hybrid rose variety, 'Mademoiselle Bonnaire', a white blend Hybrid Perpetual two years later. Encouraged by the rose's commercial success, he continued to breed roses. Some of his more popular roses include, 'Jean Pernet' (1867), Baronness Rothchild (1868), 'Ferdinand ChafJ'ollc' (1879), 'Merveille de Lyon (1882), and 'Triomphe des Noisettes' (1887). Among rose breeders, Jean Pernet was known as 'Pernet pere'.

Jean Pernet and his son, Joseph Pernet-Ducher, were interested in developing a bright yellow, repeat flowering Hybrid Perpetual rose variety. They experimented with Rosa foetida, also known as 'Persian Yellow'. In 1887, father and son crossed a red Hybrid Perpetual, 'Antoine Ducher' and 'Persian Yellow'. The resulting seedling was planted in Pernet-Ducher's garden. Two years later, a new promising seedling from the 'Antoine Ducher'/'Persian Yellow' cross would develop into the Fetida hybrid, 'Soleil d'Or'.

Pernet died on March 31, 1896, in Villeurbanne, a suburb of Lyon. Pernet-Ducher would continue with the rose hybridizing experiments and developed a worldwide reputation in 1900 when he introduced 'Soleil d'Or'', the first yellow Hybrid Tea. This rose it is now recognized as the first of the Pernetiana Roses (Roses of Pernet) and an important ancestor of the famous 'Peace.

== Selected roses ==
- 'Mademoiselle Bonnaire', Noisette, (1859)
- 'Baroness Rothschild'- (1868)
- 'Prince Napoléon', Bourbon, (1864)
- 'Madame Bellon', Hybrid Perpetual, (1871)
- 'Caroline Küster', Noisette, (1872)
- 'Madame Souveton', Portland, (1874)
- 'Marie Louise Pernet', Hybrid Perpetual, (1876)
- 'Louis Gimard', Moss, (1877)
- 'Merveille de Lyon', Hybrid Perpetual, (1882)
- 'Souvenir de Victor Hugo', Hybrid Perpetual, (1885)
- 'Triomphe des Noisettes', Noisette, (1887)
- 'Madame Dubost', Bourbon, (1890)
- 'Marchioness of Salisbury', Hybrid Tea, (1890)

== Sources ==
- Dickerson, Brent C (1992). The Old Rose Advisor. Portland, Oregon: Timber Press. ISBN 978-0-88192-216-5.
- Quest-Ritson, Brigid; Quest-Ritson, Charles (2003). Encyclopedia of Roses. DK Publishing. ISBN 978-0756688684.
- Phillips, Roger; Rix, Martyn (1993). The Quest for the Rose. New York: Random House. ISBN 978-0-679-43573-0.
