= Rosa 'The Countryman' =

Pink shrub rose cultivar

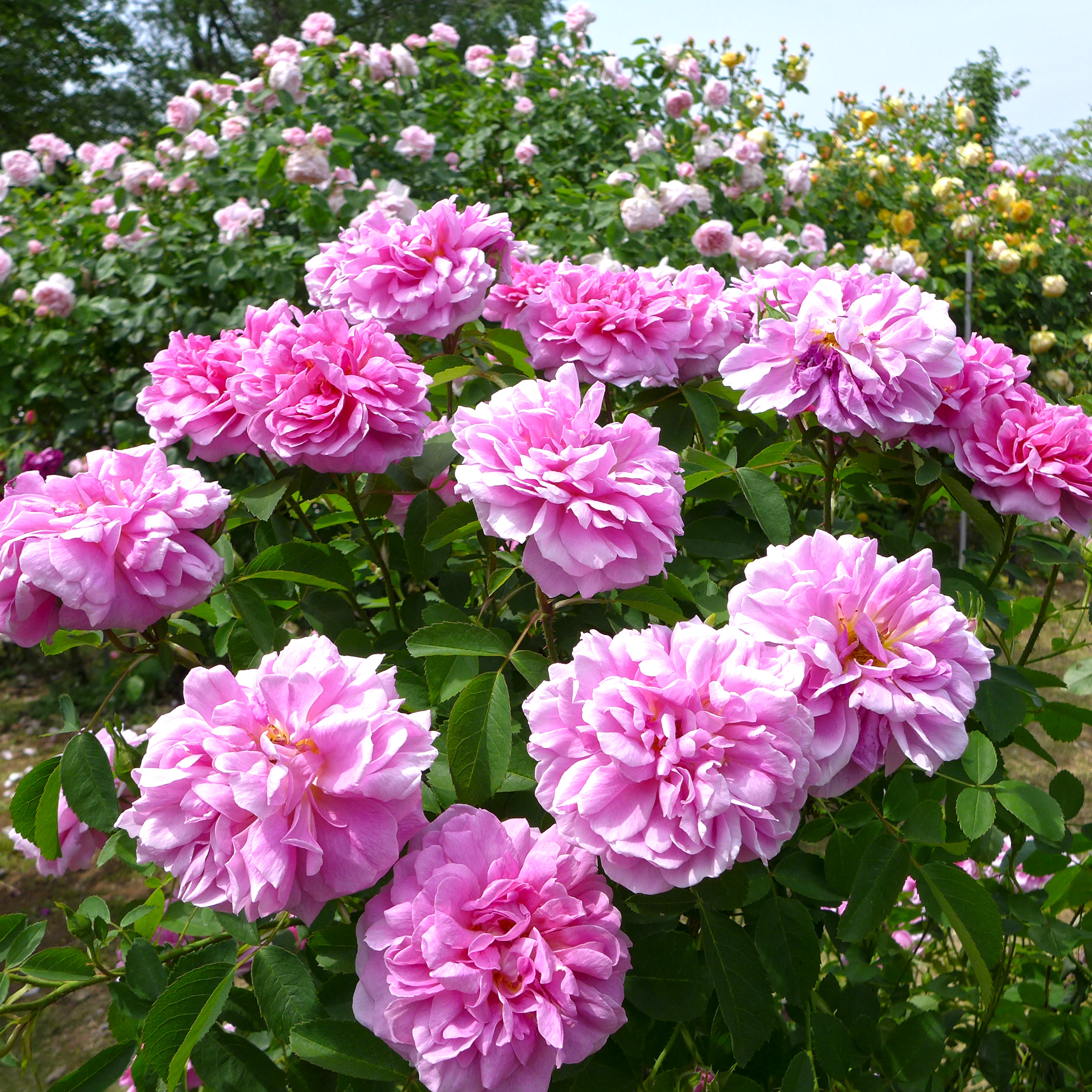
- Rosa 'The Countryman'
- Genus: Rosa hybrid
- Hybrid parentage: ''Lilian Austin' and 'Comte de Chambord'
- Cultivar group: Shrub rose
- Cultivar: 'AUSman'
- Breeder: David C. H. Austin
- Origin: Great Britain, 1979

Rosa 'The Countryman' (a.k.a. AUSman) is a pink shrub rose cultivar, created by British rose breeder David C. H. Austin. It was named for The Countryman magazine. The rose was introduced into the UK by David Austin Roses Limited (UK) in 1979.

== Description ==
'The Countryman' is a medium-tall bushy shrub rose, 3 to 5 ft (0.91–1.52 m) in height, with a 3 to 4 ft (0.91–1.22 m) spread. The rose is characteristic of the Portland roses and has a strong, Old Rose fragrance. Its flowers are 3 in (76 mm) in diameter, with a very full (40+ petals), flat, ruffled bloom form. Bloom colour is initially a dark pink when first opening and fades to a medium pink as the flower matures. Petal backs and edges are pale pink. Flowers are carried on short stalks in small clusters. Leaves are dark green, matte and leathery. The plant blooms in flushes throughout the growing season.

== History ==
=== David Austin roses ===
David C. H. Austin (1926–2018) was an award-winning rose breeder, nursery owner and writer from Shropshire, England. When he was young, he was attracted to the beauty of old garden roses, especially the Gallicas, the Centifolias and the Damasks, which were popular in nineteenth century France. Austin began breeding roses in the 1950s with the goal of creating new shrub rose varieties that would possess the best qualities of old garden roses while incorporating the long flowering characteristics of hybrid tea roses and floribundas.

His first commercially successful rose cultivar was 'Constance Spry', which he introduced in 1961. He created a new, informal class of roses in the 1960s, which he named "English Roses". Austin's roses are generally known today as "David Austin Roses". Austin attained international commercial success with his new rose varieties. Some of his most popular roses include 'Wife of Bath' (1969), 'Graham Thomas' (1983), 'Abraham Darby' (1985) and 'Gertrude Jekyll' (1986).

=== 'The Countryman' ===
Austin developed the cultivar with stock parents 'Lilian Austin' and 'Comte de Chambord'. As a new addition to Austin's "English Rose Collection", the new cultivar was introduced into the UK by David Austin Roses Limited (UK) in 1979. It was named for The Countryman magazine, founded in the UK in 1927. 'The Countryman' was used to propagate one child plant, the shrub rose, 'Harlow Carr'.
