= Rosa 'Cécile Brünner' =

Rose cultivar

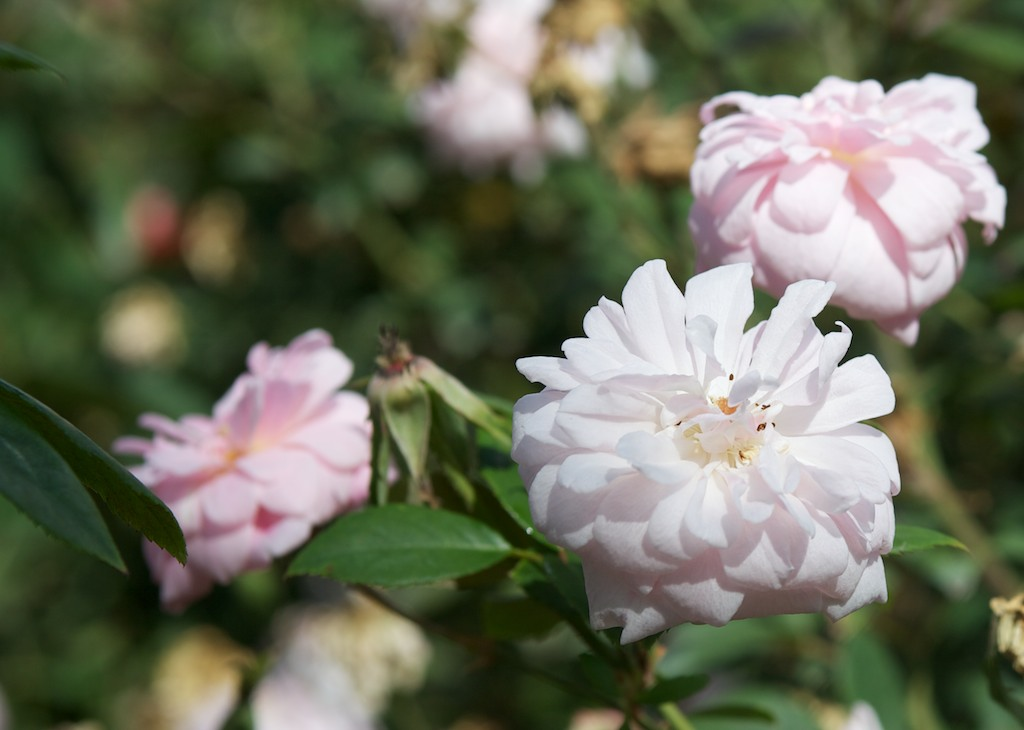
- Genus: Rosa hybrid
- Hybrid parentage: R. multiflora × tea rose, identity uncertain
- Cultivar group: polyantha rose
- Cultivar: Cécile Brünner
- Marketing names: Mademoiselle Cécile Brünner, Malteser Rose, Mignon, Sweetheart Rose
- Breeder: Marie Ducher / Pernet-Duchet
- Origin: France, 1881

Rosa 'Cécile Brünner', also known as 'Mlle Cécile Brünner', 'Sweetheart Rose', 'Malteser Rose', or 'Mignon', is a light pink polyantha rose bred in France by Marie Ducher and introduced by her son-in-law, Joseph Pernet-Ducher in 1881. Its parents were a double-flowered R. multiflora and a hybrid tea rose, either 'Souvenir d'un Ami' or a seedling of 'Mme de Tartas'. It is not clear if the rose was named after the sister (1853–1927) or daughter (b. 1879) of Ulrich Brunner fils.

== Description ==
'Cécile Brünner' has small double flowers, developing from high-centered buds to form pom-poms with a diameter of 2 to 6.5 cm (0.75 in to 2.5 in). Their pink colour fades from the outside with age, resulting in pale pink edges with yellow undertones and a deeper pink center. The flowers appear abundantly in large clusters throughout the season, have a petal count over 50 and are moderately scented.

The shrub is short but vigorous, with very few prickles, smooth, mid green leaves, and a height of 60 to 120 cm (2 to 4 feet) at an average width of 60 cm (2 feet). 'Cécile Brünner' tolerates shade and poorer soils, is very disease resistant and winter hardy up to −26 °C (USDA zone 5b). 'Cécile Brünner' can also be grown as a garden plant or in pots and greenhouses and is available in commerce.

== Sports ==
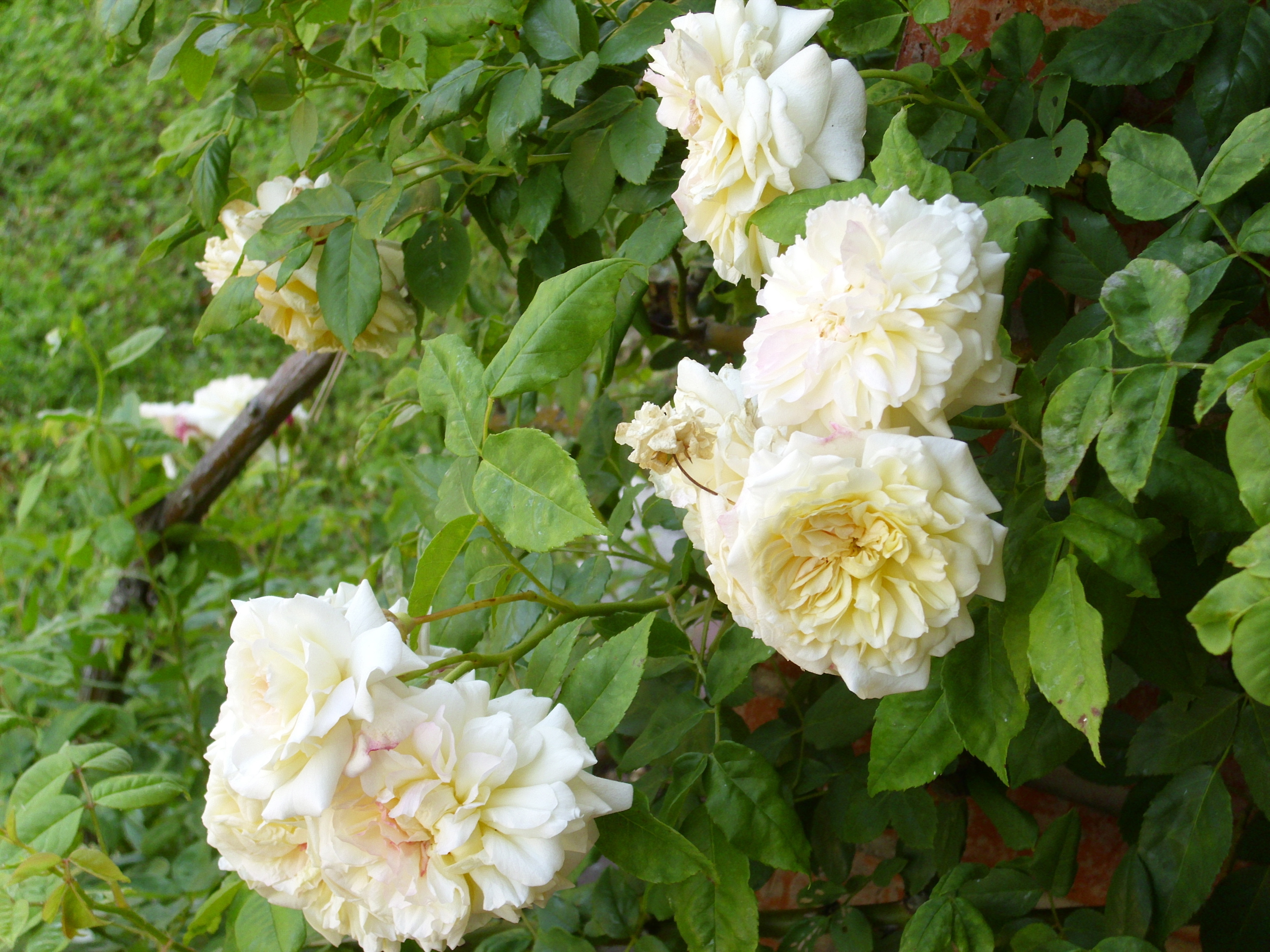
'Climbing Cécile Brünner', Hosp 1894

Several sports of 'Cécile Brünner' were introduced, including climbing forms ('Mlle Cécile Brünner Cl.' discovered by Franz P. Hosp of Riverside, California in 1894 and 'Cécile Brünner Cl.' discovered by Richard Ardagh in Australia in 1904), a dwarf white-flowered form ('White Cécile Brünner', introduced by Fraque in 1909), and deeper pink variants (e.g. 'Mme Jules Thibaud'). The climbing sports normally grow 6 m tall and 3 m wide, but can reach a height of up to 10 m. Their flowers strongly resemble those of 'Cécile Brünner', and appear in a single flush in early summer with a few scattered later blooms. The climber tolerates half shade and can develop some globose, orange hips.

Recently, it was confirmed by DNA analyses that 'Spray Cécile Brünner' (Howard Rose, 1941) is identical with the plants now grown under the name of the cultivar 'Bloomfield Abundance' (Thomas, 1920) and is a sport of 'Cécile Brünner', not related to the original 'Bloomfield Abundance' which was a hybrid seedling of 'Sylvia' and 'Dorothy Page-Roberts'.

== Awards ==
'Cécile Brünner' was inducted into the Old Rose Hall of Fame in 1988. Its sport 'Climbing Cécile Brünner' gained the Royal Horticultural Society's Award of Garden Merit in 1993, the original form followed in 1994.

== See also ==
- Rosa 'Perle d'Or', also called 'Yellow Cécile Brünner'
