= Heritage Rose District of New York City =

Area in Manhattan, New York City

The Heritage Rose District of New York City is the only rose district in the United States. It is the result of the efforts of the Office of the Manhattan Borough President and the Heritage Rose Foundation, a non-profit organization dedicated to the preservation of old roses.

The Heritage Rose District includes the western portion of Northern Manhattan between West 122nd and West 163rd streets, with Broadway and Trinity Church Cemetery at its center. There are also additional plantings on the grounds of Trinity Cemetery and at several nearby locations. The Heritage Rose District, with an initial collection of over a hundred roses, was established in Fall 2009.

Heritage Rose District of NYC. Updated May 2012

== History ==
The Heritage Rose Foundation was established in 1986 and is devoted to the preservation of old roses. It is a nonprofit organization committed to the preservation of heritage roses and promotion of their culture; as well as to establish gardens where these roses may be grown and appreciated by the public; to promote public knowledge and appreciation of heritage roses and their preservation.

The Foundation has an official list of goals.

In early 2011, a mobile walking tour was created for the Heritage Rose District. The template for the mobile site was created by Jacob Graff, a high school student from Dallas, Texas; an iPhone version is being developed. The tour takes visitors through the history each of the District's sites. June 9, 2012 was officially proclaimed Jacob Graff Day by New York City in honor of Jacob's contribution.

Future planting sites are currently being proposed. Sites will have plenty of sunlight, protection from the elements, separation from walking paths, protection from road salt and other de-icing agents, and dedicated maintenance by an individual or organization; they will preferably also be surrounded by fencing and/or on raised beds.

== Description ==
The majority of roses selected for the Heritage Rose District are known to have been grown in New York City before the twentieth century. They are described in the Manhattan Borough President's Office website. Single quotes with a name denote a known name. Double quotes denote a “study” name, meaning the rose is in commerce but its origins have been lost. The majority of roses for the Heritage Rose District were donated, and by June 2012 ~1000 roses are on display. Matthew Graff, a high school student from Dallas, TX, built a misting system to allow him to grow and then donate roses to the District.

- 'Apothecary's Rose' and 'Rosa Mundi'
- 'Audubon'
- 'Baltimore Belle'
- 'Celsiana'
- 'Centifolia'
- 'Cramoisi Supérieur'
- 'Duchess of Portland'
- 'Fellemberg'
- 'Graham Thomas's Single Musk'
- 'Green Mount Red'
- 'Green Ros'
- 'Harison's Yellow'
- 'Hermosa'
- 'Louis Philippe'
- 'Madame Boll'
- 'Maggie'
- 'Maitland White'
- 'Princess de Nassau'
- 'Puerto Rico'
- 'Rose du Roi'
- 'Russeliana'
- 'Scotch Roses'
- 'The Shipwreck Rose'
- 'Souvenir de la Malmaison'
