= Rosa 'Harison's Yellow' =

Rose cultivar

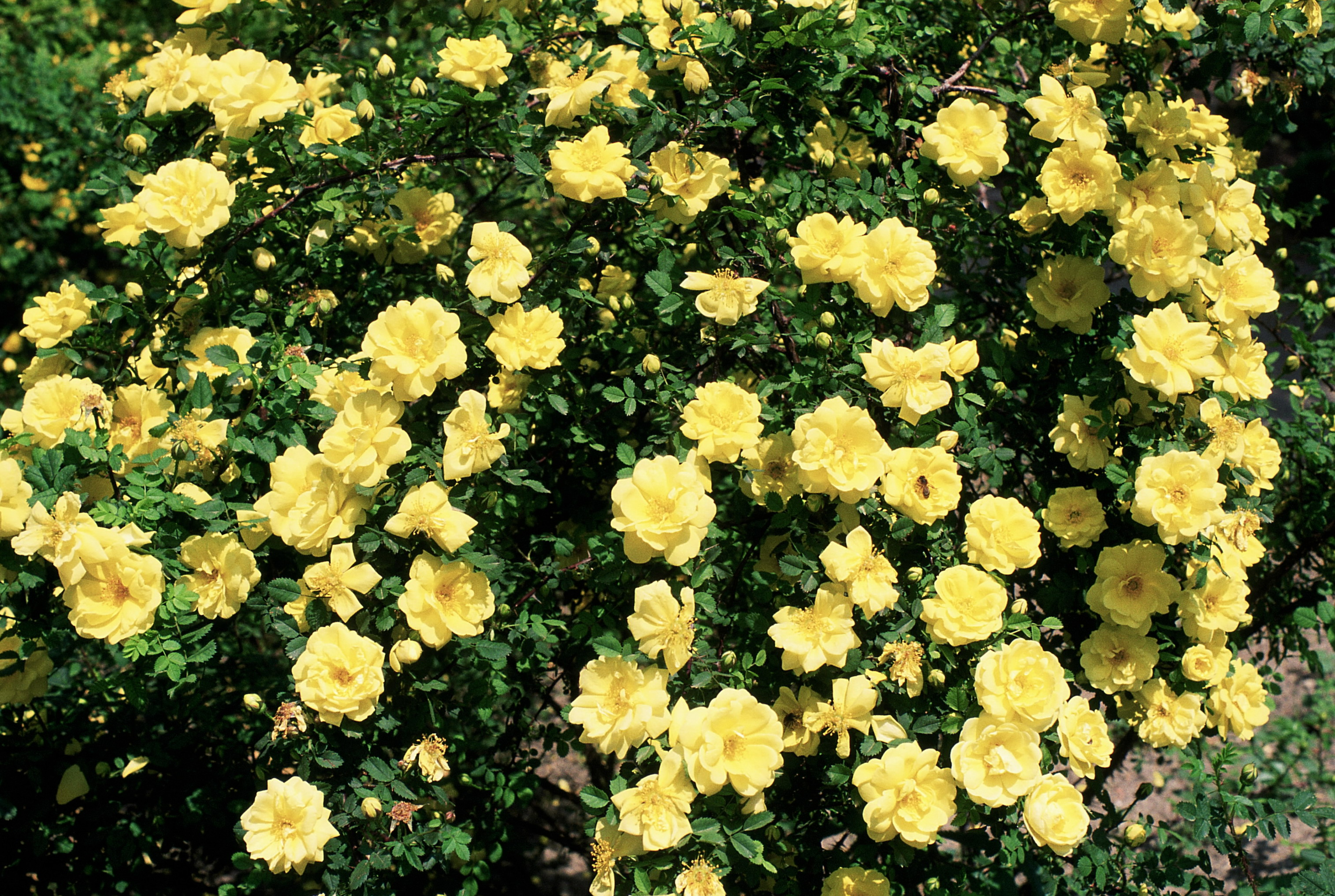
- Genus: Rosa hybrid
- Hybrid parentage: Rosa foetida × Rosa pimpinellifolia ?
- Cultivar: 'Harison's Yellow'
- Marketing names: Oregon Trail Rose, Yellow Rose of Texas, R. × harisonii, R. foetida var. harisonii, R. lutea var. hogii, R. harisonii var. vorbergii, Yellow Sweet Brier, Hogg's Yellow
- Origin: Selected by George Folliott Harison, United States, c.1824.

Rosa 'Harison's Yellow', also known as R. × harisonii, the Oregon Trail Rose or the Yellow Rose of Texas, is a rose cultivar which originated as a chance hybrid in the early 19th century. It probably is a seedling of Rosa foetida and Rosa pimpinellifolia. The cultivar first bloomed at the suburban villa of George Folliott Harison, attorney, between 8th and 9th Avenues on 32nd Street, north of New York City. The site of Harison's villa is now just south of the present General Post Office. The nurseryman William Prince of Flushing, Long Island took cuttings and marketed the rose in 1830. 'Harison's Yellow' is naturalized at abandoned house sites through the west and is found as a feral rose along the Oregon Trail.

'Harison's Yellow' was planted by the Heritage Rose Foundation in the Spring of 2009 near the grave of George Folliott Harison. The planting is now a part of the Heritage Rose District of NYC.

The cultivar has semi-double, clear yellow flowers with an average diameter of 5 to 6 centimetres (2.0 to 2.4 in), up to 25 petals, a slightly cupped bloom form, and a fruity fragrance. They appear in clusters in an early spring flush, lasting for three to four weeks.

'Harison's Yellow' has prickles, small, greenish grey leaves with seven to nine leaflets, and develops many small, globular rose hips. The young hips are first green, then red, and turn to black in the ripe fruits, that reach an average diameter of 1.5 centimetres (0.59 in). The bushy shrub forms suckers on its own roots, and reaches a height and width of 1 to 1.75 metres (3.3 to 5.7 ft). The cultivar tolerates drought, shade and poorer soils, needs little care, and is very winter hardy – down to −35 °C (USDA zone 4). It can be planted solitary, in groups or as hedges. "Harison's Yellow" is a very thorny plant which makes pruning a painful task if not wearing gloves.
