= Cornucopia (magazine) =

Turkish–British newspaper

- Cover of issue 32
- Editor: John Scott
- Categories: Culture, Travel, Design, Style
- Frequency: 3/year
- Publisher: Berrin Torolsan
- Founded: 1992
- Country: Turkey
- Based in: London, UK, and Istanbul
- Language: English
- Website: www.cornucopia.net
- ISSN: 1301-8175

Cornucopia is a magazine about Turkish culture, art and history, published jointly in the United Kingdom and Turkey.

== Content ==
Cornucopia was founded by John Scott and Berrin Torolsan in 1992. It is an English language magazine that concerns Turkish culture. The magazine has a broad scope that covers Turkey's heritage (prehistoric, Byzantine, Ottoman and Republican and that of the Turkic peoples.

The magazine also documents recent auctions and exhibitions of Turkish Art and Islamic art around the world. It has a large books section with reviews by prominent contributors.

Cornucopia also carries regular features on food, restaurants and life in Turkey by Berrin Torolsan, Andrew Finkel and Azize Ethem respectively.

== Heritage ==
Notably, Cornucopia has brought publicity to some of Turkey's threatened heritage.

- At the end of 1993 it documented the Mocan Yali in the historic area of Kuzguncuk, in 'The Pink House' by Andrew Finkel. The wooden building has since been pulled down and rebuilt in concrete.
- The 1999 article 'Rhapsody in Blue' by John Carswell documented the 14th-century tiles of the Murad II Mosque in Edirne. These have since been vandalised.

In both cases this is the only photographic record in print.

- In 1999 James Mellaart chose to publish his controversial discovery of 9,000-year-old paintings of Çatalhöyük in the early 1960s.

== Critical reaction ==
- Maureen Freely, The Guardian: "Finally, no one should go to Turkey without reading at least a few issues of Cornucopia (cornucopia.net), which has to be one of the most beautiful magazines in the world. Published here, its remit is Turkey – not its sordid politics, but its art, architecture, history and antiquities."
- Craig Brown, The Daily Telegraph: "Surely one of the most intelligent and beautiful glossy magazines in the world".
- Tyler Brûlé, founding editor of Wallpaper* and Monocle: "Focused on celebrating and chronicling all things Ottoman-inspired and influenced, Cornucopia is a cross between World of Interiors and National Geographic, with a gentle Turkic twist. I've been trying to collect all the missing back issues for years now and still have some annoying gaps in my neatly arranged stacks."
- Travis Elborough, The Guardian: "… boasting pages with the sheen of baklava and sumptuous full-colour photography throughout (and the photos, many stunning, do have the edge over the words in amount of space occupied), Cornucopia … doesn't skimp on writing of quality either."
- Caterina Scaramelli, who spent a summer helping out at their İstanbul office, is quoted in Today's Zaman: "I see articles in Cornucopia as a journey into intriguing aspects of life, culture and history in Turkey; some are secret pearls waiting to be discovered, while others are subjects represented to the public with great attention to detail and accompanied by splendid photos. Cornucopia is a great travel companion, whether the journey is real or imagined. It's published three times a year and distributed both in Turkey and worldwide with around 18,000 copies sold each time."
