= Remontancy =

Term in horticulture

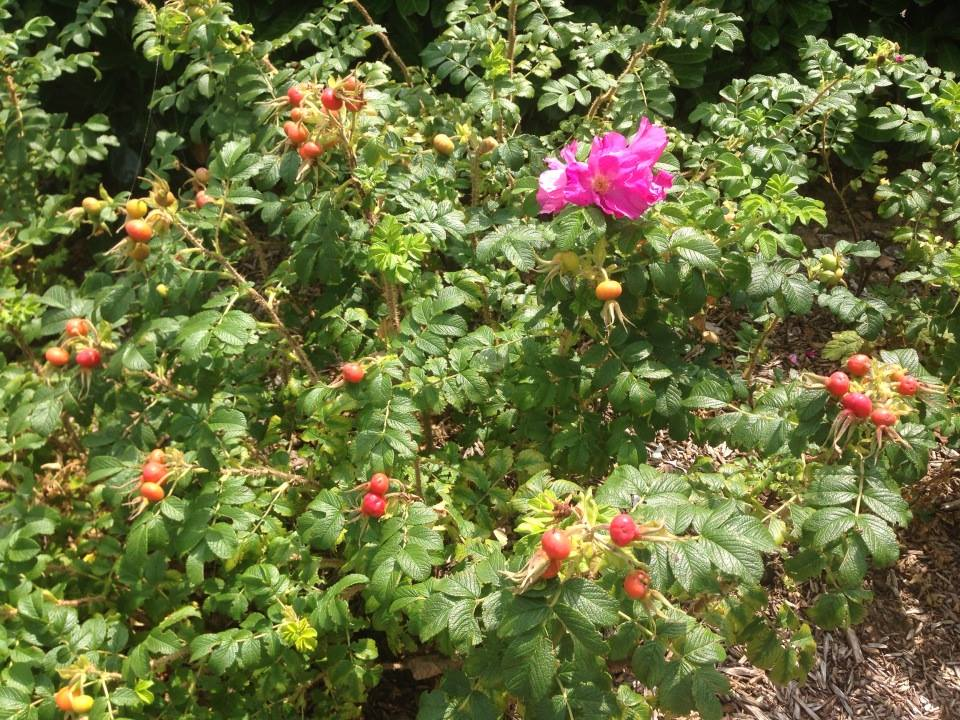
The July remontance of this Rosa rugosa appears over the fruits of the first spring blooming.

Remontancy is the ability of a plant to flower more than once during the course of a growing season or year. It is a term applied most specifically to roses, and roses possessing this ability are called "repeat flowering" or remontant. The term originated in the nineteenth century from the French verb remonter or 'coming up again'. Roses which lack this ability are termed "summer flowering", "once flowering" or non-remontant. Few wild rose species possess remontancy; notable exceptions being Rosa chinensis, Rosa rugosa and Rosa fedtschenkoana.

As remontancy is considered a desirable horticultural characteristic, it is preferentially selected for by rose hybridisers. Remontant roses descended from Rosa chinensis have been grown in China for at least a thousand years, but the first garden roses in Europe to possess remontancy were the autumn damasks, which first appeared in the seventeenth century with the introduction of the cultivar 'Quatre Saisons'. Recent DNA research has shown that these damask roses resulted from crosses involving Rosa gallica, Rosa moschata and the remontant central Asian species Rosa fedtschenkoana. When forms of Rosa chinensis were introduced into Europe in the late eighteenth century, subsequent hybridisation between these and the European roses eventually led to the wide variety of remontant garden hybrids which are available today.
