= Martyn Rix =

British botanist and horticulturist (born 1943)

Edward Martyn Rix
- Born: 15 August 1943 (age 82)
- Education: Trinity College Dublin
- Alma mater: Cambridge University
- Known for: Fritillaria
- Spouse: Alison Jane Goatcher
- Awards: Veitch Memorial Medal
- Scientific career
- Fields: Botany, plant collection, garden design
- Institutions: University of Zurich, Royal Horticultural Society, Wisley, Royal Botanic Gardens, Kew
- Author abbrev. (botany): Rix

Edward Martyn Rix FLS (born 15 August 1943) is a British botanist, collector, horticulturist and author. Following completion of a PhD on Fritillaria at Cambridge University, he worked in Zürich, Switzerland and at the Royal Horticultural Society gardens at Wisley. He is the author of many books and articles on plants and horticulture and is the editor of Curtis's Botanical Magazine, based at the Royal Botanic Gardens, Kew in London.

== Life ==
Born on 15 August 1943 to Edward Lionel Reusner and Elizabeth (Joyce) Rix, Martyn Rix was educated at Trinity College Dublin (MA), and Corpus Christi College, Cambridge University, where he received his PhD at biology school in 1971 for his dissertation on Fritillaria in Greece and Turkey (partially published as Rix 1974). He married Alison Jane Goatcher in 1983, with whom he frequently collaborates, and they have two daughters.

== Work ==
Following completion of his doctorate he worked as a fellow at the Institute of Systematic Botany, University of Zurich, studying water weeds of India and co-authoring Waterplants of the World (1971–1973), before becoming a botanist at the Royal Horticultural Society, Wisley (1974–1978). He travelled widely, collecting and photographing plants, including botanical expeditions to China, Mexico, South Africa and Argentina, and introducing a large number of plants into cultivation in Europe and North America. He has been involved in the design and planting of gardens in many parts of the world including California, Bermuda, the Virgin Islands, Turkey, France and Italy. Together with plant photographer Roger Phillips, David Lindsay and Sam Phillips, he ran an internet site called RogersRoses.

Martyn Rix works at the Royal Botanic Gardens, Kew and is a Fellow of the Linnean Society of London (FLS). His major interest is Liliaceae, especially Fritillaria.

== Publications ==
Rix has authored contributions in many major botanical texts including The European Garden Flora, Flora Europaea, Flora of Turkey, the Kew Bulletin and has been editor of Curtis's Botanical Magazine since 2003. He is the author of a number of books including Art of the Plant World, Art in Nature and Redoute Album. The latter deals with the work of the botanical artist Pierre-Joseph Redouté. He has also contributed to television programmes such as The Quest for the Rose (BBC). Together with Roger Phillips he has contributed to over thirty plant books, especially The Garden Plant series on individual plant groups. Martyn Rix writes for magazines such as Country Life, Gardens Illustrated, The English Garden Magazine and Cornucopia.

=== List of selected publications ===
see Encyclopedia 2017

==== Books ====
- Water Plants of the World: a Manual for the Identification of the Genera of Freshwater Macrophytes, C.D.K. Cook, B.J. Gut, E. Martyn Rix, Jakob Schneller, Marta Seitz, Dr. W. Junk B.V. Publishers (1974), ISBN 90-6193-024-3
- Art of the Plant World, Martyn Rix, Penguin Group USA (1982), ISBN 0879511397
- Garden Open Today: To Celebrate the Diamond Jubilee of the National Gardens Scheme, Martyn Rix, Alison Rix, Viking (1987), ISBN 0670814024
- Redoute Album, Martyn Rix, Alison Rix Studio Edns. (1990) 310 pp. ISBN 1851703985
- Art in Nature, Martyn Rix, : Studio Edns. (1991), ISBN 1851706348
- Vegetables, Roger Phillips, Martyn Rix, (1993)
- The Quest for the Rose, Roger Phillips, Martyn Rix, Random House Inc (1994), ISBN 0679435735
- Best Rose Guide: A Comprehensive Selection, Roger Phillips, Martyn Rix, Firefly Books Ltd (2004), ISBN 1552978443
- The Botanical Garden 2005 Calendar, Roger Phillips & Martyn Rix, Firefly Books Ltd (2004), ISBN 1552971821
- The Botanical Garden 2006 Calendar, Roger Phillips & Martyn Rix, Firefly Books Ltd (2005), ISBN 1552972151
- The Botanical Garden 2007 Calendar, Roger Phillips & Martyn Rix, Firefly Books Ltd (2006), ISBN 1552972593
- Subtropical and Dry Climate Plants: The Definitive Practical Guide, Martyn Rix, Timber Press (2006), ISBN 0881928089
- Growing bulbs Croom Helm. 209 pp. (1983) ISBN 0-917304-87-X
- Roses Random House Roger Phillips, E. Martyn Rix 224 pp. (1988) ISBN 0-394-75867-6
- The art of botanical illustration. Arch Cape Press. 224 pp. (1990)
- Conservatory and indoor plants. The garden plant series, Volume 1 of Conservatory and indoor plants: plants for warm gardens. Roger Phillips, E. Martyn Rix, Alison Rix Pan. 286 pp. (1998) ISBN 0-330-37375-7
- The ultimate guide to roses: a comprehensive selection Roger Phillips, E. Martyn Rix Macmillan. 288 pp. (2004) ISBN 1-4050-4920-0
- Treasures of botanical art: icons from the Shirley Sherwood and Kew collections. Sherwood, Shirley, E. Martyn Rix Kew Pub. 272 pp. (2008) ISBN 1-84246-221-0
- E. M. Rix (1980). "Fritillaria". In Tutin, T. G.; Heywood, V H; Burges, N. A.; Moore, D. M.; Valentine, D. H.; Walters, S. M.; Webb, D. A. (eds.). Flora Europaea. Volume 5, Alismataceae to Orchidaceae (monocotyledones). Cambridge, England: Cambridge University Press. pp. 31–34. ISBN 0-521-20108-X. see also Flora Europaea
- Rix, Martyn (2001). Fritillaria: A Revised Classification : Together with an Updated List of Species. Fritillaria Group of the Alpine Garden Society.

==== Articles ====
- Rix, E. M. (1974). "Notes on Fritillaria (Liliaceae) in the Eastern Mediterranean Region, I & II". Kew Bulletin. 29 (4): 633–654. doi:10.2307/4108130. JSTOR 4108130.
- —; Rast, Dora (February 1975). "Nectar sugars and subgeneric classification in Fritillaria". Biochemical Systematics and Ecology. 2 (3–4): 207–209. doi:10.1016/0305-1978(75)90063-0.
- Rix, E. M. (1977). "Fritillaria L. (Liliaceae) in Iran" (PDF). Iranian Journal of Botany. 1 (2): 75–95.
- -----, Brian Mathew 2007. Puschkinia peshmenii Hyacinthaceae. Curtis's Botanical Magazine 24 ( 1 ): 54-57
- —; Strange, Kit (September 2014). "791. Fritillaria sororum". Curtis's Botanical Magazine. 31 (3): 214–222. doi:10.1111/curt.12075.

==== Thesis ====
- Rix, E. M. (1971). The taxonomy of the genus Fritillaria in the Eastern Mediterranean region (PhD thesis). Cambridge University.

== Awards ==
In 1998 Rix was awarded the Royal Horticultural Society's Veitch Memorial Gold Medal. In 2025 he was awarded the Victoria Medal of Honour.

== Legacy ==
Martyn Rix is the botanical authority for 33 taxa that bear his name, such as Fritillaria gussichiae.

The following plants are named after Martyn Rix:

- Bellevalia rixii Wendelbo
- Fritillaria rixii Zaharof

IPNI. List of plant names with authority Rix.

== Bibliography ==
- "Fritillaria (European species)". Cambridge University Botanic Garden.
- "Martyn Rix". Contributors. Cornucopia.
- "The Veitch Memorial Medal" (PDF). The Green Manual. Royal Horticultural Society. 2014. p. 53. Archived from the original (PDF) on 14 March 2018.
- "RogersRoses". Archived from the original on 4 March 2016.
- "Martyn Rix". Author profile. Timber Press.
- "Curtis's Botanical Magazine". Curtis's Botanical Magazine. 2017. doi:10.1111/(ISSN)1467-8748.
- "Rix, (Edward) Martyn 1943-". Contemporary Authors. Encyclopedia.com.
