= Roger Phillips (photographer) =

British photographer, botanist and writer (1932–2021)

Roger Phillips MBE
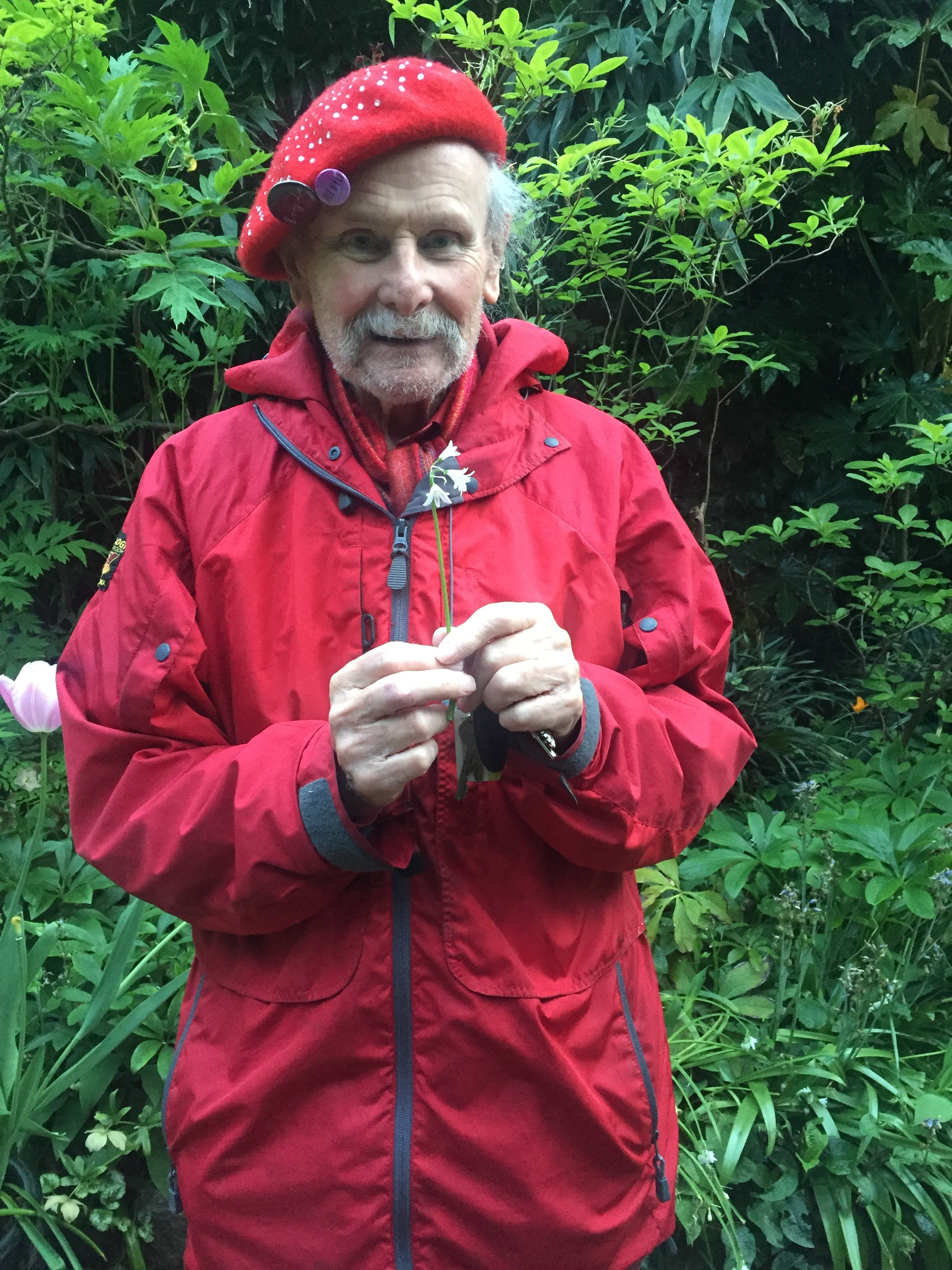
- Born: Roger Howard Phillips; 16 December 1932; Uxbridge, England
- Died: 15 November 2021 (aged 88)
- Occupations: Photographer, botanist, writer

Roger Howard Phillips MBE (16 December 1932 – 15 November 2021) was a British photographer, botanist and writer.

== Biography ==
Phillips was born on 16 December 1932 in Uxbridge to Philip and Elsie Phillips (née Williams). He was educated at St Christopher School in Letchworth and – after national service with the Royal Air Force in Canada – at Chelsea School of Art. He next joined Ogilvy & Mather Advertising, where he rose to be art director. He turned freelance in 1968. He took pictures for the album Goodbye for rock band Cream, on a commission from his friend Alan Aldridge, and later took pictures for the Jack Bruce albums Songs for a Tailor and Out of the Storm.

He is best known for his photographic books of the British flora. The first, Wild Flowers of Britain sold 400,000 copies in the first year. It was about the first plant identification book that had photographs, rather than paintings, of flowers. In total, his 20 books sold over 4.5 million copies worldwide.

He was also an expert on mushrooms and roses who wrote more than forty books on gardening and wild plants and fungi; many with Martyn Rix. He was also an Honorary Garden Manager at Eccleston Square in London, where he lived, and served as chair of the Society for the Protection of London Squares.

He presented two six-part television series, 1994's The Quest for the Rose for BBC Television and, in 1995, The 3,000 Mile Garden for PBS.

In later life he also exhibited his paintings.

In the 2010 New Year Honours, Phillips was appointed a Member of the Order of the British Empire (MBE), for his "services to London Garden Squares".

== Personal life ==
Phillips' 1958 marriage to Pammy Wray ended in divorce; they had a son, and she predeceased him. He subsequently had two daughters with his second wife Nicky Foy, whom he married in 2003.

He died on 15 November 2021, at the age of 88.

== Selected publications ==
- Phillips, Roger, and Jacqui Hurst. 1983. Wild food: [a unique photographic guide to finding, cooking and eating wild plants, mushrooms and seaweed]. London: Pan Books.
- Phillips, Roger, Derek Reid, Ronald Rayner, and Lyndsay Shearer. 1981. Mushrooms and other fungi of Great Britain and Europe. London: Pan Books.
