= List of rose cultivars named after people =

A number of rose cultivars (rose plants bred and developed for their specific characteristics, such as size, colour or scent) have been named after real-life individuals or fictional characters. These roses may have been named after the person who originally bred them, or to honour a certain individual or character.

== A ==
Name of variety	Namesake	Date	Rose breeder	Location	Image	Ref
A. Drawiel	Andreas Drawiel	1887	Leveque	France		
Abbé André Reitter	Abbé André Reitter	1904	Welter	Germany		
Abbé Berlèse	Lorenzo Berlèse	1864	Guillot	France		
Abbé Bramérel	Abbé Bramérel	1871	Guillot	France		
Abbé Giraudier		1869	Levet	France		
Abel Carrière	Élie-Abel Carrière	1875	E. Verdier	France		
Abelle Weber-Paté		1904	Lambert	Germany		
Abraham Darby	Abraham Darby III	1985	Austin	United Kingdom		
Achille Gonod	Achille Gonod	1864	Gonod	France		
Adam Messerich	Adam Messerich	1920	Lambert	Germany		
Adélaide d'Orléans	Adélaïde d'Orléans	1826	Jacques	France		
Adelaide Hoodless	Adelaide Hoodless	1973		Canada		
Adèle Heu	Adèle Heu aka 'Duke of Orléans'	1816	Vibert	France		
Adèle Pavie		1851	Robert	France		
Adèle Prévost		Before 1836				
Admiral Tirpitz	Alfred von Tirpitz	1918	Kiese	Germany		
Adolf Deegen	Adolf Degen	1935	Böhm	Czechoslovakia		
Adolf Horstmann	Adolf Horstmann	1971	Kordes	Germany		
Adolphe van den Heede	Adolphe van den Heede	1904	Lambert	Germany		
Adrian Reverchon	Adrian Reverchon	1909	Lambert	Germany		
Ady Endre emleke	Endre Ady	2004	Mark	Hungary		
Aenne Burda	Aenne Burda	1973	Kordes	Germany		
Agar		1836	Laffay	France		
Agatha Christie aka 'Ramira'	Agatha Christie	1988	Kordes	Germany		
Aglaia	Aglaïa	Before 1811	Descemet	France		
Aglaia aka 'Yellow Rambler'	Aglaïa	1896	Schmidt/Lambert	Germany		
Agnes	Agnes Saunders	1900	Saunders	Canada		
Agnes Bernauer	Agnes Bernauer	1989	Kordes	Germany		
Agnes Schilliger	Agnes Schilliger	2002	Massad	France		
Aimée Vibert aka 'Bouquet de la Mariée'	Aimée Vibert	1828	Vibert	France		
Alain Blanchard	Alain Blanchard	1839	Vibert	France		
Alain Souchon aka 'Father's Love' aka 'Rouge Royale ®'	Alain Souchon	2000	Meilland	France		
Alan Titchmarsh	Alan Titchmarsh	2007	Austin	United Kingdom		
Albéric Barbier	Albéric Barbier	1900	Barbier	France		
Alberich		1954	De Ruiter	The Netherlands		
Albert Edwards		1961	Hillier	United Kingdom		
Albert Hoffmann	Albert Hoffmann	1904	Welter	Germany		
Albert James Nottidge		1909	Welter	Germany		
Albert Payé		1873	Tourais	France		
Albert Poyet		1979	Eve			
Albrecht Dürer	Albrecht Dürer	2002	Tantau	Germany		
Alec C. Collie			Cocker	United Kingdom		
Alexander MacKenzie	Alexander Mackenzie	1985		Canada		
Alexander Dumas	Alexandre Dumas	1861	Margottin	France		
Alexander Suddaby		1977	London	United Kingdom		
Alexandre Dupont		1892	Liabaud	France		
Alexandre Girault	Alexandre Girault	1909	Barbier	France		
Alexandre Laquement		1906	Roseraie de L'Hay	France		
Alfieri	Vittorio Alfieri	After 1800		France		
Alfred Colomb	Alfred Colomb	1865	Lacharme	France		
Alfred de Dalmas	Alfred de Dalmas	1855	Portemer/Laffay	France		
Alfred K. Williams	Alfred K. Williams	1877	Schwartz	France		
Alice Aldrich	Alice Aldrich	1899	Lovett	USA		
Alice Hamilton	Alice Hamilton	1904	Nabonnand	France		
Alice Hoffmann	Alice Hoffmann	1897	Hoffmann	Germany		
Alice Rauch	Alice Rauch	1909	Geschwind	Austria-Hungary		
Alice Vena aka 'Cora' aka 'Ombrée Parfait'	Alice Vena	Before 1828	Lecomte			
Alida Lovett	Alida Lovett	1905	Van Fleet	USA		
Alison Wheatcroft	Alison Wheatcroft	1959	Wheatcroft	United Kingdom		
Alister Stella Gray	Alister Stella Gray	1894	Gray	United Kingdom		
Alphonse Daudet	Alphonse Daudet	1997	Meilland	France		
Amadeus (II)	Wolfgang Amadeus Mozart	2003	Kordes	Germany		
Amadis	Amadis	1829	Laffay	France		
Amalia Jung	Amalia Jung	1934	Leenders	Netherlands		
Amalie de Greiff	Amalie de Greiff	1912	Lambert	Germany		
Amandine Chanel	Amandine Chanel	2004	Massad	France		
Ambroise Paré	Ambroise Paré	1846	Vibert	France		
Amelia Earhart	Amelia Earhart	1932	Reymond	USA		
Amélie Gravereaux	Amélie Gravereaux	1900	Gravereaux	France		
Amélie Hoste	Amélie Hoste	1875	Gonod	France		
Amy Robsart	Amy Robsart	1894	Penzance	United Kingdom		
Anaïs Ségalas	Anaïs Ségalas	1837	Vibert	France		
Andenken an Alma de L'Aigle	Alma de l'Aigle	1955	Wohlt/Kordes	Germany		
Anacréon	Anacreon	1836	Vibert	France		
Andenken an Ferdinand Hopf	Ferdinance Hopf	1927	Elbel	Germany		
Andenken an Gustav Frahm	Gustav Frahm	1956	Kordes	Germany		
Andenken an Joh. Diering	Johnathan Diering	1902	Hinner	Germany		
Andenken an Erreth Jolànka	Erreth Jolànka	1916	Welter	Germany		
Andenken an Moritz von Fröhlich	Moritz von Fröhlich	1904	Hinner	Germany		
Andreas Hofer	Andreas Hofer	1911	Kiese	Germany		
André Le Nôtre aka 'Betty White'	André Le Nôtre	2001	Meilland	France		
André Leroy d'Angers	André Leroy	1866	Trouillard	France		
Angela Müll	Angela Müll	1902	Hinner	Germany		
Angela Rippon	Angela Rippon	1978	De Ruiter	The Netherlands		
Angela Welter	Angela Welter	1903	Welter	Germany		
Angéle Pernet	Angéle Pernet	1924	Pernet-Ducher	France		
Angels Mateu	Angels Mateu	1934	Dot	Spain		
Angyal Dezső emléke	Angyal Dezső	2000	Mark	Hungary		
Anikó		1994	Mark	Hungary		
Anisley Dickson	Anisley Dickinson	1983	Dickson	United Kingdom		
Ann Saxby	Ann Saxby	1997	Austin	United Kingdom		
Anne de Besobrasoff		1878	Gonod	France		
Anna de Diesbach	Anna de Diesbach	1858	Lacharme	France		
Anna Ford	Anna Ford	1980	Harkness	United Kingdom		
Anna Geschwind		1882	Geschwind	Austria-Hungary		
Anna Pavlova	Anna Pavlova	1891	Beales	United Kingdom		
Anna Rübsamen	Anna Rübsamen	1903	Weigand	France		
Anna Scharsach		1890	Geschwind	Austria-Hungary		
Anna Schneider	Anna Schneider	1912	Welter	Germany		
Anna Zinkeisen	Anna Zinkeisen	1983	Harkness	United Kingdom		
Annamarie Jacobs		1911	Jacobs	Germany		
Ännchen Müller		1907	J.C. Schmidt	Germany		
Ännchen von Tharau	Anna Neander	1886	Geschwind	Austria-Hungary		
Anne Boleyn	Anne Boleyn	1999	Austin	United Kingdom		
Anne Cocker	Anne Cocker	1970	Cocker	United Kingdom		
Anne de Bretagne (rose)	Anne of Brittany	1979	Meilland	France		
Anne Harkness	Anne Harkness	1979	Harkness	United Kingdom		
Anne-Marie de Montravel	Anne-Marie de Montravel	1879	Rambeaux	France		
Anne-Marie d'Orbesson	Anne-Marie d'Orbesson	1820	Jacques	France		
Anne Marie Trechslin	Anne Marie Trechslin	1968	Meilland	France		
Anne-Mette Poulsen	Anne-Mette Poulsen	1935	Poulsen	Denmark		
Anne of Geierstein	Anne of Geierstein	1894	Penzance	United Kingdom		
Anneliese Rothenberger	Anneliese Rothenberger	1975	Tantau	Germany		
Annie Welter	Annie Welter	1912	Welter	Germany		
Anthony Meilland	Anthony Meilland	1990	Meilland	France		
Antigone	Antigone	1969	Gaujard	France		
Antoine Devert	Antoine Devert	1880	Gonod	France		
Antoine Ducher	Antoine Ducher	1826	Ducher	France		
Antoine Mouton	Antoine Mouton dit Moutony	1874	Levet	France		
Antoine Rivoire	Antoine Rivoire	1895	Pernet-Ducher	France		
Antonia d'Ormois	Antonia d'Ormois	1835	Vibert	France		
Antonia Ridge	Antonia Ridge	1976	Meilland	France		
Antonie Schurz	Antonie Schurz	1890	Geschwind	Austria-Hungary		
Anuschka	Udo Jürgens	1977	Tantau	Germany		
Aphrodite	Aphrodite	2006	Tantau	Germany		
Apor Vilmos emléke	Vilmos Apor	1994	Mark	Hungary		
Apotheker Georg Höfer		1902	Welter	Germany		
Áprily Lajos emléke	Lajos Áprily	2000	Mark	Hungary		
Arany János emléke	János Arany	2006	Mark	Hungary		
Archiduc Charles	Archduke Charles, Duke of Teschen	1825	Laffay	France		
Archiduc Joseph	Archduke Joseph Karl of Austria	1892	Nabonnand	France		
Archiduchesse Elisabeth d'Autriche	Archduchess Elisabeth Franziska of Austria	1881	Moreau-Robert	France		
Ariana El		1912	Geschwind	Austria-Hungary		
Arielle Dombasle	Arielle Dombasle	1992	Meilland	France		
Arillaga	Mariano Paredes y Arrillaga	1929	Schoener	USA		
Aristide Briand	Aristide Briand	1928	Penny	France		
Arlene Francis	Arlene Francis	1957	Boerner/Jackson and Perkins	USA		
Armide	Armida	1817	Vibert	France		
Arndt	Ernest Moritz Arndt	1913	Lambert	Germany		
Arpad-hazi Szent Erzsebet emléke	Elisabeth of Hungary	1995	Mark	Hungary		
Arthur Bell	Arthur Bell	1965	McGredy	Ireland		
Arthur de Sansal	Arthur de Sansal	1855	Cochet	France		
Arthur Rimbaud	Arthur Rimbaud	2008	Meilland	France		
Arthur Scargill	Arthur Scargill					
Arthur Young	Arthur Young	1863	Portemer	France		
Arva Leany	Arva Leany	1911	Geschwind	Austria-Hungary		
Asta von Parpart	Asta von Parpart	1909	Geschwind	Austria-Hungary		
Astra Desmond	Astra Desmond			United Kingdom		
Astrid Lindgren	Astrid Lindgren	1989	Olesen	Denmark		
Athena	Athena	1982	Kordes	Germany		
Audie Murphy	Audie Murphy	1957	Lammerts	USA		
Audrey Hepburn	Audrey Hepburn	1991	Twomey	USA		
Audrey Wilcox	Audrey Wilcox	1987	Fryer	United Kingdom		
August Seebeauer	August Seebeauer	1944	Kordes	Germany		
Augusta Luise	Augusta Louise zu Stolberg-Stolberg	1999	Tantau	Germany		
Auguste Gervais	Auguste Gervais	1918	Barbier	France		
Auguste Kordes	Auguste Kordes	1928	Kordes	Germany		
Auguste Renoir	Pierre-Auguste Renoir	1995	Meilland	France		
Auguste Roussel	Auguste Roussel	1913	Barbier	France		
Augustine Guinoisseau	Augustine Guinoisseau	1889	Guinoisseau	France		
Augustine Halem		1891	Guillot	France		
Augustus Hartmann	Augustus Hartmann	1914	Cant	Germany		
Aurelia Liffa	Aurelia Liffa	1886	Geschwind	Austria-Hungary		
Aurora	Aurora	1923	Pemberton	United Kingdom		
Aurore de Jacques-Marie	Aurore de Jacques-Marie	1999	Guillot	France		
Aurore Poiniatowska	Aurore Poiniatowska	1820	Du Pont	Paris, France		
Ausonius	Ausonius	1932	Lambert	Germany		
Aviateur Blériot	Louis Blériot	1909	Fauqué	France		
Avocat Duvivier	Avocat Duvivier	1875	Lévêque	France		

== B ==
Name of variety	Namesake	Date	Rose breeder	Location	Image	Ref
Barbara Austin	Barbara Austin	1997	Austin	United Kingdom		
Barbara Bush	Barbara Bush	1978	Warriner	USA		
Barbara Carrera	Barbara Carrera	1994	Beales	United Kingdom		
Barbara Mandrell	Barbara Mandrell	1990	King	USA		
Barbra Streisand	Barbra Streisand	2001	Carruth	USA		
Barbarossa	Frederick I, Holy Roman Emperor	1906	Welter	Germany		
Bardou Job	Pierre Bardou-Job	1887	Nabonnand	France		
Báró Natália		1889	Geschwind	Austria-Hungary		
Baron Alexandre de Vrints	Alexandre de Vrints Treuenfeld	1880	Gonod	France		
Baron de Bonstetten	Baron de Bonstetten	1871	Liabaud	France		
Baron Girod de l'Ain	Amédée Girod de l'Ain	1897	Reverchon	France		
Baron de Wassenaer	Baron de Wassenaer	1854	Verdier	France		
Baron J. B. Gonella	Baron J.B. Gonella	1859	Guillot	France		
Baron Palm		1913	Lambert	Germany		
Baron van Pallandt	Rudolph van Pallandt	1905	Welter	Germany		
Baronin Armgard von Biel		1905	Jacobs	Germany		
Baroness Rothchild	Caroline Julie von Rotschild	1862	Lacharme	France		
Baronne Caroline von Rothschild	Caroline Julie von Rothschild	1868	Jean Pernet, père	France		
Baronne de Fontvieille		1886	Gonod	France		
Baronne de Sinétry		1883	Gonod	France		
Baronne Edmond de Rothschild	Nadine de Rothschild	1968	Meilland	France		
Baronne Henriette de Snoy	Henriette de Snoy	1897	Bernaix	France		
Baronne Prévost		1842	Desprez	France		
Belle Bigottini	Émilie Bigottini	1825	Laffay and Noisette	France		
Belle Isis	Isis	1845	Parmentier	Belgium		
Belmonte		2007	Harkness	United Kingdom		
Benjamin Britten	Benjamin Britten	2001	Austin	United Kingdom		
Benoit Broyer		1875	Gonod	France		
Béranger	Pierre-Jean de Béranger	1849	Vibert	France		
Bergrat Otto Berger	Bergrat Otto Berger	1924	Berger	Germany		
Bernard		1818	Robert	France		
Bernd Weigel	Bernd Weigel	2003	Tantau	Germany		
Bertrand Amoussou	Bertrand Amoussou	2007	Reuter	France		
Betty Harkness	Betty Harkness	1998	Harkness	United Kingdom		
Betty Prior	Betty Prior	1935	Prior	United Kingdom		
Betty Sheriff	Betty Sheriff	1788				
Betty Uprichard	Betty Uprichard	1922	Dickson	United Kingdom		
Betty White aka 'André Le Nôtre'	Betty White	2001	Meilland	France		
Billy Graham	Billy Graham	1998	Zary	USA		
Bing Crosby	Bing Crosby	1981	Weeks	USA		
Bischof Dr. Korum	Michael Felix Korum	1921	Lambert	Germany		
Bishop Darlington	James Henry Darlington	1926	Thomas	USA		
Blanchefleur	Blanchefleur	1835	Vibert	France		
Bob Hope	Bob Hope	1960	Kordes	Germany		
Bobbie James	Bobbie James	1961	James	United Kingdom		
Bobby Charlton	Bobby Charlton	1974	Fryer	United Kingdom		
Bobby James	Bobby James	1961	Rambler	Sunningdale Nursery		
Botticelli	Sandro Botticelli	2004	Meilland	France		
Botzaris	Markos Botsaris	1856	Robert	France		
Bougainville	Louis Antoine de Bougainville	1822	Cochet	France		
Bourbon Queen	Marie-Louise, princesse de Lamballe	1834	Mauget	France		
Brenda Colvin	Brenda Colvin	1970	Colvin	United Kingdom		
Brenda Lee	Brenda Lee	1990		USA		
Brennus	Brennus	1830	Laffay	France		
Brigitte Bardot	Brigitte Bardot	2001	Orard	France		
Brigitte de Villenfagne	Brigitte de Villenfagne	1993	Lens	Belgium		
British Queen	Mary of Teck	1912	McGredy	Ireland		
Bürgermeister Christen Bergmann	Christen Bergmann	1911	Teschendorff	Germany		

Top of page

== C ==
Name of variety	Namesake	Date	Rose breeder	Location	Image	Ref
Caecilie Scharsach		1887	Geschwind	Austria-Hungary		
Camille Bernardin	Camille Bernardin	1865	Gautreau	France		
Camille Pissarro	Camille Pissarro	1996	Delbard	France		
Camoëns	Luís de Camões	1881	Schwartz	France		
Capitaine Basroger		1890	Moreau-Robert	France		
Capitaine Dyel de Graville		1907	Boutigny	France		
Capitaine John Ingram	John Ingram	1856	Laffay	France		
Capitaine Williams		1835		France		
Captain Bligh	William Bligh	1938	Fitzhardinge	Australia		
Captain Hayward	William Hayward	1893	Bennett	United Kingdom		
Captain Philip Green		1899	Nabonnand	France		
Captain Samuel Holland	Samuel Holland	1990	Svejda	Canada		
Cardinal Hume	Basil Hume	1984	Harkness	United Kingdom		
Cardinal de Richelieu	Cardinal Richelieu	1840	Laffay	Belgium		
Carmen	Carmen	1906	Lambert	Germany		
Caroline Bank		1889	Geschwind	Austria-Hungary		
Caroline de Monaco	Caroline, Princess of Hanover	1988	Meilland	France		
Caroline Schmitt		1878	J.C. Schmidt	Germany		
Caron Keating	Caron Keating	2005	Harkness	United Kingdom		
Cary Grant	Cary Grant	1987	Meilland	France		
Casanova	Giacomo Casanova	1964	McGreedy	Ireland		
Casimir Moullé		1911	Barbier	France		
Catherine Deneuve	Catherine Deneuve	1981	Meilland	France		
Catherine de Württemberg	Catharina of Württemberg	1843	Robert	France		
Catherine Guillot	Catherine Guillot	1860	Guillot	France		
Catherine Mermet		1869	Guillot	France		
Catherine Seyton		1894	Penzance	United Kingdom		
Catherine's Rose	Catherine, Princess of Wales	2025	Harkness	United Kingdom		
Cécile Brünner aka 'The Sweetheart Rose'		1880	Ducher	France		
Cécile Brünner Climbing		1904	Hosp	USA		
Céline Forestier		1842	Trouillard	France		
Céline Gonod	Céline Gonod	1861	Gonod	France		
Celsiana	Jacques Philippe Martin Cels	cca. 1750				
Ceres	Ceres	1914	Pemberton	United Kingdom		
César	César Baldaccini	1993	Meilland	France		
Chamisso	Adelbert von Chamisso	1922	Lambert	Germany		
Champlain	Samuel de Champlain	1982	Svejda	Canada		
Chantal Merieux		1999	Guillot-Massad	France		
Charlemagne	Charlemagne	1836	Dorizy	France		
Charles Albanel	Charles Albanel	1982	Svejda	Canada		
Charles Austin	Charles Austin	1973	Austin	United Kingdom		
Charles Aznavour aka Mathilda	Charles Aznavour	1988	Meilland	France		
Charles de Gaulle	Charles de Gaulle	1975	Meilland	France		
Charles de Lapisse	Charles de Lapisse	1910	Laroulandie	France		
Charles de Mills	Charles de Mills	1840	Laffay	France		
Charles Dickens	Charles Dickens	1886	Paul	United Kingdom		
Charles Lawson	Charles Lawson	1853	Lawson	United Kingdom		
Charles Lefèbvre	Charles, comte Lefebvre-Desnouettes	1862	Lacharme	France		
Charles Mallerin		1951	Meilland	France		
Charles Margottin		1864	Margottin	France		
Charles Rennie Mackintosh	Charles Rennie Mackintosh	1988	Austin	United Kingdom		
Charlotte Armstrong		1940	Lammerts	USA		
Charlotte Ewert	Charlotte Ewert	1994	Scholle	Germany		
Charlotte Klemm		1905	Türke	Germany		
Charlotte Rampling	Charlotte Rampling	1988	Meilland	France		
Chaucer	Geoffrey Chaucer	1970	Austin	United Kingdom		
Chief Seattle	Chief Seattle	1951	Swim & Armstrong	USA		
Chloris	Chloris	1820	Descemet	France		
Chopin	Frédéric Chopin	1988	Zyla	Poland		
Chris Evert	Chris Evert	1997	Carruth	United Kingdom		
Christian Curle		1909	Cocker	United Kingdom		
Christian Dior	Christian Dior	1958	Meilland	France		
Christian Schultheis		1999	Schultheis	Germany		
Christiane Hörbiger	Christiane Hörbiger	1988	McGreedy	New Zealand		
Christine Wright		1909	Hoopes	USA		
Christl Flocke		1995	Scholle	Germany		
Christopher Columbus	Christopher Columbus	1992	Meilland	France		
Christophe de Combejean		2004	Massad	France		
Christopher Marlowe	Christopher Marlowe	2002	Austin	United Kingdom		
Cicely Lascelles		1932	Clark	Australia		
Cicely O'Rorke		1937	Clark	Australia		
Cilly Michel		1928	Felberg	Germany		
Claire Laberge		2001	Fleming			
Claire Rayner	Claire Rayner	1931	Jones	United Kingdom		
Claire Austin	Claire Rose Austin	1986	Austin	United Kingdom		
Clarissa	Clarissa Kaye-Mason	1983	Harkness	United Kingdom		
Claude Brasseur	Claude Brasseur	2006	Meilland	France		
Claude Monet	Claude Monet	1982	Delbard	France		
Claudia Cardinale	Claudia Cardinale	1997	Guillot-Massad	France		
Claus Groth		1951	Tantau	Germany		
Climbing Eva Teschendorff	Eva Teschendorff	1926	Opdebeeck	Belgium		
Climbing Hermann Robinow	Hermann Robinow	1934	Lambert	Germany		
Climbing Jackie Moore	Jackie Moore	1957		USA		
Climbing Lady Hillingdon	Alice Marion Harbord	1917	Hicks	United Kingdom		
Climbing Madame Abel Chatenay		1917	Easlea	United Kingdom		
Climbing Maman Cochet		1915	Howard & Smith	USA		
Climbing Paul Lédé	Paul Lédé	1902	Lowe & Shawyer	United Kingdom		
Climbing Schneewittchen aka 'Iceberg'	Snow White	1970	Kordes	Germany		
Clio	Clio	1894	Paul	United Kingdom		
Clytemnestra	Clytemnestra	1915	Pemberton	United Kingdom		
Colette	Colette	1995	Meilland	France		
Commandant Beaurepaire	Nicolas-Joseph Beaurepaire	1874	Moreau-Robert	France		
Commandant Cousteau	Jacques-Yves Cousteau	1993	Adam	France		
Commandeur Jules Gravereaux	Jules Gravereaux	1909	Croibier	France		
Comte de Chambord	Henri, comte de Chambord	1860	Moreau-Robert	France		
Comte de Nanteuil (II)	Auguste Boula de Nanteuil	1850	Quetier	France		
Comte de Paris	Philippe, comte de Paris	1886	Leveque	France		
Comte G. de Rochemur		1911	Schwartz	France		
Comtesse Brigitte Chandon-Moët	Brigitte Chandon-Moët	1997	Dorieux	France		
Comtesse Cécile de Chabrillant	Cécile de Chabrillant	1858		France		
Comtesse Cécile de Forton	Cécile de Forton	1916	Nabonnand	France		
Comtesse d'Oxford	Eliza Nugent	1869	Guillot	France		
Comtesse de Caserta		1878	Nabonnand	France		
Comtesse de Cassagne		1919	Guillot	France		
Comtesse de Lacépède		1840	Duval	France		
Comtesse de Leusse		1878	Nabonnand	France		
Comtesse de Murinais		1843	Vibert	France		
Comtesse de Noghera		1902	Nabonnand	France		
Comtesse de Ségur	Sophie Rostopchine	1994	Delbard	France		
Comtesse Diana	Countess Diana Bernadotte of Wisborg	1993	Hetzel	Germany		
Comtesse du Barry	Madame du Barry	1993	Verschuren	The Netherlands		
Comtesse du Cayla	Zoé Talon	1902	Guillot	France		
Comtesse Riza du Parc		1876	Schwartz	France		
Comtesse Vandal		1932	Leenders	The Netherlands		
Condesa de Barcelona		1988	Ferrer	Spain		
Condesa de Mayalde		1956	Dot	Spain		
Condesa de Sástago		1930	Dot	Spain		
Conrad Ferdinand Meyer	Conrad Ferdinand Meyer	1899	Dr. Müller	Switzerland		
Constance Finn	Constance Finn	1997	Harkness	United Kingdom		
Constance Spry	Constance Spry	1961	Austin	United Kingdom		
Coralie		before 1848		France		
Cornelia	Cornelia Africana	1925	Pemberton	United Kingdom		
Corporal Johann Nagy	Johann Nagy	1890	Geschwind	Austria-Hungary		
Cosimo Ridolfi	Cosimo Ridolfi	1842	Vibert	France		
Coupe d'Hébé	Hebe	1840	Laffay	France		
Countess of Stradbroke		1928	Clark	Australia		
Countess of Wessex	Sophie, Duchess of Edinburgh	2004	Beales	United Kingdom		
Cristoforo Colombo	Christopher Columbus	1953	Aicardi	Italy		
Crown Princess Margareta	Princess Margaret of Connaught	2000	Austin	United Kingdom		
Crown Princess Mary	Mary, Crown Princess of Denmark	2006		Australia		
Cymbaline	Cunobelinus	1982	Austin	United Kingdom		
Cuthbert Grant	Cuthbert Grant	1989		Canada		
Cyrano	Cyrano de Bergerac	1954	Gaujard	France		

Top of page

== D ==
Name of variety	Namesake	Date	Rose breeder	Location	Image	Ref
D'Aguesseau		1836	Vibert	France		
Dagmar Späth		1935	Späth	Germany		
Dame Edith Helen	Edith Vane-Tempest-Stewart	1926	Dickson	United Kingdom		
Dame of Sark	Sibyl Mary Hathaway	1976	Harkness	United Kingdom		
Dame Prudence		1969	Austin	United Kingdom		
Dame Wendy	Wendy Hiller	1991	Cant	United Kingdom		
Dan Poncet	Dan Poncet	1999	Guillot-Massad	France		
Danaë	Danaë	1913	Pemberton	United Kingdom		
Dany Hahn		2004	Guillot	France		
Daphné	Daphne	1819	Vibert	France		
Daphne		1962	Leenders	Netherlands		
Darius	Darius I of Persia	1827	Laffay	France		
David Thompson	David Thompson	1979	Svejda	Canada		
De la Grifferaie		1845	Vibert	France		
Dearest	Maud Dickson	1960	Dickson	United Kingdom		
Dee Bennett		1988	Saville	USA		
Dee Dee Bridgewater	Dee Dee Bridgewater	2003	Meilland	France		
Delambre	Jean Baptiste Joseph Delambre	1863	Moreau-Robert	France		
Della Balfour		1994	Harkness	United Kingdom		
Dembrowski		1849	Vibert	France		
Denise Hilling		1965	Hilling	France		
Désirée Parmentier	Désirée Parmentier	Before 1848	Parmentier	Belgium		
Deuil de Paul Fontaine	Paul Fontaine	1873	Fontaine	France		
Deuil du Prince Albert	Prince Albert	1862	Lapente	France		
Detlev von Liliencron	Detlev von Liliencron	1915	Lambert	Germany		
Diana	Diana	1977	Tantau	Germany		
Diana, Princess of Wales	Diana, Princess of Wales	1998	Zary	USA		
Dieter Müller	Dieter Müller	2005	Delbart	France		
Dieter Wedel	Dieter Wedel	1997	Dickson	United Kingdom		
Direktor Benschop		1945	Tantau	Germany		
Direktor W. Cordes		1905	Lambert	Germany		
Docteur Andry		1864	Verdier	France		
Docteur Eckener	Hugo Eckener	1928	V. Berger	Germany		
Doctor Dick		1985	Cocker	United Kingdom		
Dolly Parton	Dolly Parton	1984		USA		
Dometil Beccard		1853		France		
Domkapitular Dr. Lager		1903	Lambert	Germany		
Donna Marie		1830	Vibert	France		
Dora Hansen		1911	Jacobs	Germany		
Doris Tysterman		1975	Tysterman	United Kingdom		
Dorothea Söffker		1899	Welter	Germany		
Dorothy Perkins	Dorothy Perkins	1901	Miller	USA		
Dorothy Wheatcroft		1960	Tantau	Germany		
Dorothy Whitney Wood		1992	Fryer	United Kingdom		
Dorothy Wilson		1995	Beales	United Kingdom		
Dr. Augustin Wibbelt	Augustin Wibbelt	1928	Leenders	Netherlands		
Dr. Bender		1914	Lambert	Germany		
Dr. Christian Friedrich Samuel Hahnemann	Samuel Hahnemann	2006	Huber	Switzerland		
Dr. Debat		1948	Meilland	France		
Dr. Georges Martin		1908	Vilin	France		
Dr. Gustav Krüger	Gustav Krüger	1913	Ulbrich/Kiese	Germany		
Dr. Harry Upshall		1986	Fleming	Canada		
Dr. Heinrich Lumpe		1928	V. Berger	Germany		
Dr. Helfferich		1919	Lambert	Germany		
Dr. Huey	Robert Huey	1914	G. Thomas	USA		
Dr. Ing. H. Blohm		1919	Lambert	Germany		
Dr. John Snow		1979	Gandy	United Kingdom		
Dr. Karel Kramář	Karel Kramář	1937	Böhm	Czechoslovakia		
Dr. Martin Luther	Martin Luther	2000	Scholle	Germany		
Dr. Masaryk		1930	Böhm	Czechoslovakia		
Dr. Omar Zawawi		2000	Schmadlak	Germany		
Dr. Reiner Klimke	Reiner Klimke	1988	Noack	Germany		
Dr. Rouges		1893	Schwartz	France		
Dr. Rudolf Maag	Rudolf Maag	1968	Meilland	France		
Dr. Valentin Teirich		1890	Geschwind	Austria-Hungary		
Dr. W. van Fleet		1910	Van Fleet	USA		
Dr. Waldheim		1974	Kordes	Germany		
Druschki Rubra		1929	Lambert	Germany		
Duc d'Aremberg	Engelbert, 8th Duke of Arenberg	1836	Parmentier	Belgium		
Duc d'Audiffret-Pasquier	Gaston d'Audiffret-Pasquier			France		
Duc d'Aumale	Henri d'Orleans			France		
Duc d'Orléans	Prince Ferdinand Philippe			France		
Duc de Bordeaux	Henri d'Artois	1820	Vibert	France		
Duc de Bragance	Peter V of Portugal			France		
Duc de Cambridge	Prince Adolphus	1800	Laffay	France		
Duc de Cazes	Élie Decazes	1861	Touvais	France		
Duc de Constantine		1857	Soupert & Notting	France		
Duc de Fitz-James	Edouard Antoine Sidoine de Fitz-James	1885		France		
Duc de Guiche	Agenor, duc de Gramont	1835	Prévost	France		
Duc de Malakoff	Aimable Pélissier			France		
Duc de Montpensier	Prince Antoine			France		
Duc de Rohan	Fernand de Rohan-Chabot	1847	Lévêque	France		
Duc de Rohan	Fernand de Rohan-Chabot	1861	Lévêque	France		
Duc de Wellington	Arthur Wellesley	1864	Granger	France		
Duchess of Bedford	Elizabeth Russell, Duchess of Bedford	1879	Postans	United Kingdom		
Duchess of Connaught	Princess Louise Margaret of Prussia	1879	Bennett	United Kingdom		
Duchess of Connaught	Princess Louise Margaret of Prussia	1882	Standish & Noble	United Kingdom		
Duchess of Cornwall	Camilla, Duchess of Cornwall	2005	Tantau	United Kingdom		
Duchess of Edinburgh	Maria Alexandrovna of Russia	1874	Bennett	United Kingdom		
Duchess of Fife	Louise, Princess Royal and Duchess of Fife			United Kingdom		
Duchess of Kent	Katharine, Duchess of Kent	1968	Waterhouse	United Kingdom		
Duchess of Portland	Margaret Bentinck	1775		Italy		
Duchess of Sutherland	Harriet Sutherland-Leveson-Gower	1839	Laffay	France		
Duchess of Wellington		1909	Dickson	United Kingdom		
Duchess of York	Princess Frederica Charlotte of Prussia	1897	Cocker	United Kingdom		
Duchess of York	Queen Elizabeth the Queen Mother	1926	Hazlewood Bros.	Australia		
Duchess of York	Sarah Ferguson	1994	Dickson	United Kingdom		
Duchesse Antonine d'Ursel	Antonine de Mun			France		
Duchesse d'Abrantès	Laure Junot	1851	Robert	France		
Duchesse d'Angoulême	Marie-Thérèse-Charlotte of France	1828	Vibert	France		
Duchesse d'Aoste	Princess Hélène d'Orléans			France		
Duchesse d'Auerstedt	Jeanne Alice de Voise	1888	Bernaix	France		
Duchesse d'Orléans	Maria Amalia of the Two Sicilies	1820	Jacques	France		
Duchesse d'Orléans	Duchess Helen of Mecklenburg-Schwerin	1851	Quétier	France		
Duchesse d'Ossuna	María Leonor de Salm-Salm			France		
Duchesse de Berry	Princess Caroline Ferdinande	1818	Vibert	France		
Duchesse de Brabant	Marie Henriette of Austria	1857	Bernède	France		
Duchesse de Bragance				France		
Duchesse de Buccleugh	Charlotte Montagu Douglas Scott	1837	Vibert	France		
Duchesse de Buccleugh	Charlotte Montagu Douglas Scott	1846	Robert	France		
Duchesse de Cambacérès	Louise Anne Alexandrine Thibon			France		
Duchesse de Caylus				France		
Duchesse de Dino	Princess Dorothea of Courland	Before 1829		France		
Duchesse de Dino	Princess Dorothea of Courland	1889	Lévêque	France		
Duchesse de Galliera	Maria Brignole Sale De Ferrari	1847	Portemer	France		
Duchesse de Grammont		Before 1838				
Duchesse de Magenta	Élisabeth de Mac Mahon			France		
Duchesse de Montebello	Louise Antoinette Lannes	c. 1838	Laffay	France		
Duchesse de Montpensier	Infanta Luisa Fernanda			France		
Duchesse de Morny	Sofia Sergeyevna Trubetskaya			France		
Duchesse de Nemours	Princess Victoria of Saxe-Coburg and Gotha			France		
Duchesse de Norfolk	Augusta Fitzalan-Howard			France		
Duchesse de Polignac	Yolande de Polastron			France		
Duchesse de Rohan	Octavie Rouillé de Boissy	1847	Lévêque	France		
Duchesse de Rohan	Octavie Rouillé de Boissy	1858		France		
Duchesse de Vallombrosa		1876	Schwartz	France		
Duchesse de Verneuil		1856	Portemer			
Duhamel du Monceau	Henri-Louis Duhamel du Monceau			France		
Duke of Albany	Prince Leopold			United Kingdom		
Duke of Connaught	Prince Arthur	1875	Paul	United Kingdom		
Duke of Connaught	Prince Arthur	1879	Bennett	United Kingdom		
Duke of Edinburgh	Alfred, Duke of Saxe-Coburg and Gotha	1868	Paul	United Kingdom		
Duke of Edinburgh	Prince Philip	2021	Harkness	United Kingdom		
Duke of Fife	Alexander Duff			United Kingdom		
Duke of Teck	Prince Francis			United Kingdom		
Duquesa de Peñaranda		1931	Dot	Spain		

Top of page

== E ==
Name of variety	Namesake	Date	Rose breeder	Location	Image	Ref
E. G. Hill	Edward Gurney Hill	1929	Hill	USA		
Earl of Dufferin	Frederick Hamilton-Temple-Blackwood		Dickson	United Kingdom		
Earl of Pembroke	George Herbert	1882	Bennett	United Kingdom		
Eckart Witzigmann	Eckart Witzigmann	2001	Delbard	France		
Edgar Degas	Edgar Degas	2002	Delbard	France		
Edith Bellenden		1895	Penzance	United Kingdom		
Édith de Murat		1858	Ducher	France		
Edith Holden	Edith Holden	1988	Warner	United Kingdom		
Edith Krause		1930	Krause	Germany		
Édith Piaf (I)	Édith Piaf	1964	Verbeek	Netherlands		
Édith Piaf	Édith Piaf	2007	Meilland	France		
Edmond Proust	Edmond Proust	1903	Barbier	France		
Edouard Guillot		2004	Guillot	France		
Edu Meyer		1904	Lambert	Germany		
Eileen O'Neill		2000	Harkness	United Kingdom		
Elfi von Dassanowsky	Elfi von Dassanowsky	2009	Jalbert	Canada		
Eliane Gillet		1998	Guillot-Massad	France		
Elie Lambert		1898	Lambert	Germany		
Elisabeth		1926	Alfons	Germany		
Elise Heymann		1891	Strassheim	Germany		
Eliza	Eliza Panarosa	2004	Kordes	Germany		
Elizabeth Harkness		1969	Harkness	United Kingdom		
Elizabeth Stuart	Elizabeth of Bohemia	2003	Guillot	France		
Elizabeth Taylor	Elizabeth Taylor	1985	Weddle			
Elke Gönewein		1974	Gönewein	Germany		
Ellen Willmott	Ellen Willmott	1936	Archer	United Kingdom		
Ellen Zinnow		1930	Krause	Germany		
Elli Hartmann		1912	Welter	Germany		
Ellinor LeGrice		1959	LeGrice	United Kingdom		
Elly J. Nieborg		2006	Nieborg	Germany		
Elmar Gunsch	Elmar Gunsch	2001	Scholle	Germany		
Else Poulsen	Else Poulsen	1924	Poulsen	Denmark		
Elvis	Elvis Presley	2004	Adam	France		
Emmanuelle		1985	Austin	United Kingdom		
Emil Simmer		1910	Türke	Germany		
Emil Nolde	Emil Nolde	2001	Tantau	Germany		
Emilien Guillot		2001	Guillot-Massad	France		
Emily Carr	Emily Carr	2005	AAFC	Canada		
Emily Gray	Emily Gray	1918	Williams	United Kingdom		
Emmy von Dippe		1915	Lambert	Germany		
Empereur du Maroc	Abderrahmane of Morocco	1858	Guinoisseau	France		
Empress Michiko	Empress Michiko	1992	Dickson	United Kingdom		
Ena Baxter		1989	Cocker	United Kingdom		
Ena Harkness	Ena Harkness	1946	Harkness	United Kingdom		
Ena Harkness Climbing	Ena Harkness	1954	Murrell	United Kingdom		
Eos	Eos	1950	Ruys	Netherlands		
Erato	Erato	1937	Tantau	Germany		
Erbprinzessin Leopold von Anhalt	Princess Elisabeth of Hesse-Kassel	1933	Behrens	Germany		
Erbprinzessin von Ratibor	Countess Marie Breuner-Enckevoirt	1893	Türke	Germany		
Erika Teschendorff		1949	Berger	Germany		
Erinnerung an Loni Westermann	Loni Westermann	1907	Welter	Germany		
Erna Teschendorff		1911	Zschöckel-Teschendorff	Germany		
Ernst G. Dörell		1888	Geschwind	Austria-Hungary		
Ernst Grandpierre		1900	Weigand	Germany		
Ernst Willner		1888	Geschwind	Austria-Hungary		
Esther aka Duchesse d'Oldenbourg		1849	Vibert	France		
Esther Ofarim	Esther Ofarim	1970	Kordes	Germany		
Esther's Baby	Esther Rantzen	1979	Harkness	United Kingdom		
Eugène E. Marlitt	E. Marlitt	1900	Geschwind	Austria-Hungary		
Eugène Fürst	Eugen Fürst	1875	Soupert & Notting	Luxemburg		
Eugène Savary		1872	Gonod	France		
Eugénie Guinoisseau		1864	Guinoisseau	France		
Eugenie Lamesch		1899	Lambert	Germany		
Euphrosyne	Euphrosyne	1896	Lambert	Germany		
Eva	Eve	1937	Kordes	Germany		
Evangeline	Evangeline	1906	Walsh	USA		
Eveline Timm			Weihrauch	Germany		
Evelyn May		2000	Beales	United Kingdom		
Evita	Eva Perón	2000	Cocker	United Kingdom		
Excellenz Kuntze		1909	Lambert	Germany		
Excellenz M. Schmidt-Metzler		1910	Lambert	Germany		

Top of page

== F ==
Name of variety	Namesake	Date	Rose breeder	Location	Image	Ref
Falstaff	John Falstaff	1999	Austin	United Kingdom		
Fanny Bias	Fanny Bias	1819	Vibert	France		
Fanny Elßler	Fanny Elßler	1835	Vibert	France		
Fantin Latour	Henri Fantin-Latour	1840		France		
Felberg-Leclerc	Johannes Felberg-Leclerc		Jacobs	Germany		
Felicia		1928	Pemberton	United Kingdom		
Felicitas	Felicity of Rome	1998	Kordes	Germany		
Félicité Bohain		1865		France		
Félicité et Perpétue	Perpetua and Felicity	1828	Jacques	France		
Felicité Parmentier		1834	Parmentier	France		
Felicity Kendal	Felicity Kendal	1985	Sealand	United Kingdom		
Félix Leclerc	Félix Leclerc	1977		Canada		
Fellemberg		1857	Fellemberg	Germany		
Fenja	Fenja	1965	Petersen	Denmark		
Ferdinand Chaffolte		1879	Pernet	France		
Ferdinand Pichard		1921	Tanne	France		
Ferry Porsche	Ferdinand Anton Ernst Porsche	1971	Kordes	Germany		
First Lady Martha Washington	Martha Washington	cca. 1889		USA		
Florence Delattre		1991	Massad	France		
Florence Nightingale	Florence Nightingale	1989	Gandy	United Kingdom		
Fornarina	Margarita Luti	1862	Robert et Moreau	France		
Forstmeisters Heim		1886	Geschwind	Austria-Hungary		
Francesca		1922	Pemberton	United Kingdom		
Francine Austin		1988	Austin	United Kingdom		
Francis Blaise		1999	Massad	France		
Francis Dubreuil	Francis Dubreuil	1894	Dubreuil	France		
Francis E. Lester	Francis E. Lester	1946	Lester	USA		
François Coppée	François Coppée	1895	Lédéchaux	France		
François Arago	François Arago	1858	Trouillard	France		
François Juranville		1906	Barbier	France		
François Poisson		1902	Barbier	France		
François Rabelais	François Rabelais	1998	Meilland	France		
Franz Pöhls		1909	Jacobs	Germany		
Frau Alexander Weiß		1909	Lambert	Germany		
Frau Alfred Mauthner		1907	Lambert	Germany		
Frau Anna Hinner		1909	Hinner	Germany		
Frau Anna Lautz		1912	Kiese	Germany		
Frau Anne Beaufays		1962	De Ruiter	Netherlands		
Frau Bertha Kiese		1913	Jacobs	Germany		
Frau Bürgermeister Kirschstein		1907	Jacobs	Germany		
Frau Cecilie Walter		1904	Lambert	Germany		
Frau Dr. Burghardt		1900	Welter	Germany		
Frau Dr. E. Skibinska			Geschwind	Austria-Hungary		
Frau Dr. Schricker		1927	Felberg	Germany		
Frau Eduard Bethge		1930	Felberg-Leclerc	Germany		
Frau Else Krech		1915	Welter	Germany		
Frau Ernst Borsig		1907	Lambert	Germany		
Frau Eva Schubert		1937	Tepelmann	Germany		
Frau Frieda Croissant		1911	Welter	Germany		
Frau Geheimrat Dr. Staub		1908	Lambert	Germany		
Frau Geheimrat von Boch		1897	Lambert	Germany		
Frau H. Stakemann		1922	Lambert	Germany		
Frau Hans Drazil		1907	Welter	Germany		
Frau Hedwig Koschel		1921	Münch & Haufe	Germany		
Frau Hedwig Wagner		1919	Krüger/Kiese	Germany		
Frau Helene Videnz		1904	Lambert	Germany		
Frau Hilde Nicolai		1916	Welter	Germany		
Frau Ida Münch		1919	Beschnidt/Münch & Haufe	Germany		
Frau J. Reiter		1904	Welter	Germany		
Frau Karl Druschki		1901	Lambert	Germany		
Frau Käthe Roth		1911	Welter	Germany		
Frau Lilla Rautenstrauch		1903	Lambert	Germany		
Frau Lina Strassheim		1907	Strassheim	Germany		
Frau Mathilde Bätz		1920	Felberg-Leclerc	Germany		
Frau Mathilde Noehl		1913	Welter	Germany		
Frau O. Plegg		1909	Nabonnand	France		
Frau Oberhofgärtner Luiger		1908	Lambert	Germany		
Frau Oberhofgärtner Schulze		1909	Lambert	Germany		
Frau Oberhofgärtner Singer		1908	Lambert	Germany		
Frau Ottilie Lüntzel		1909	Lambert	Germany		
Frau Otto Evertz		1907	Welter	Germany		
Frau Peter Lambert	Peter Lambert	1902	Welter/Lambert	Germany		
Frau Philipp Siesmayer	Philipp Siesmayer	1908	Lambert	Germany		
Frau Professor Gnau	Ewald Gnau	1925	Kiese	Germany		
Frau Robert Türke	Robert Türke	1923	Türke	Germany		
Frau Syndica Roeloffs		1900	Lambert	Germany		
Frau Therese Lang		1910	Welter	Germany		
Frau von Brauer		1913	Lambert	Germany		
Frau Viktoria von Thusansky		1888	Geschwind	Austria-Hungary		
Fräulein Octavia Hesse		1909	Hesse	Germany		
Fred Loads		1968	Holmes	United Kingdom		
Fred Streeter	Fred Streeter	1951	Jackman	USA		
Freddy Quinn	Freddy Quinn	1989	Pearce	United Kingdom		
Freddie Mercury	Freddie Mercury	1993	Battersby	United Kingdom		
Frédéric II de Prusse	Frederick II of Prussia	1847	Verdier	France		
Frédéric Mistral	Frédéric Mistral	1995	Meilland	France		
Freifrau Anna von Münchhausen		1911	Welter	Germany		
Freifrau Ella von Wangenheim	Ella von Wangenheim	1907	Jacobs	Germany		
Freifrau Ida von Schubert		1911	Lambert	Germany		
Freifrau von der Goltz		1913	Lambert	Germany		
Freiherr von Marschall	Adolf Marschall von Bieberstein	1903	Lambert	Germany		
Freiherr von Schilling	August Freiherr Schilling von Canstatt	1904	Jacobs	Germany		
Frieda Krause		1935	Krause	Germany		
Friedrich Alfred Krupp	Friedrich Alfred Krupp	1903	Welter	Germany		
Friedrich Harms	Friedrich Harms	1901	Hinner/Welter	Germany		
Friedrich Schröder		1903	Hinner	Germany		
Fritz Nobis	Fritz Nobis	1940	Kordes	Germany		
Fritz Reuter	Fritz Reuter	1913	Lambert	Germany		
Fritz Thiedemann	Fritz Thiedemann	1959	Tantau	Germany		
Fritz Walter	Fritz Walter	1987	Hetzel	Germany		
Frontenac	Louis de Buade de Frontenac	1992		Canada		
Fru Dagmar Hastrup		1901	Herts	Denmark		
Fru Dagmar Hastrup		1914	Hastrup/Poulsen	Denmark		
Fürst Bismarck	Otto von Bismarck	1886	Drogemüller	Germany		
Fürst Leopold IV zu Schaumburg-Lippe	Leopold IV, Prince of Lippe	1918	Kiese	Germany		
Fürstin von Pless	Daisy, Princess of Pless	1911	Lambert	Germany		

Top of page

== G ==
Name of variety	Namesake	Date	Rose breeder	Location	Image	Ref
Gabriela Sabatini	Gabriela Sabatini	1992		USA		
Gabrielle Noyelle		1933	Buatois	France		
Gartenarchitekt Günther Schulze aka 'The Pilgrim'	Günther Schulze	1991	Austin	United Kingdom		
Gartendirektor Otto Linne	Otto Linne	1934	Lambert	Germany		
Gartendirektor Ries		1916	J.C. Schmidt	Germany		
Gebrüder Grimm	Gebrüder Grimm	2002		Germany		
Geheimrat Dr. Mittweg		1909	Lambert	Germany		
Geheimrat Richard Willstätter	Richard Willstätter	1931	Felberg	Germany		
Gellert	Christian Fürchtegott Gellert	1917	Lambert	Germany		
Gemma	Gemma Carr	2003	Harkness	United Kingdom		
Gene Boerner	Eugene Boerner	1968	Boerner	USA		
Général Cavaignac	Louis-Eugène Cavaignac	1848	Foulard	France		
Général Desaix	Louis Charles Antoine Desaix	1867	Moreau-Robert	France		
Général Gallieni	Joseph Gallieni	1899	Nabonnand	France		
General Jacqueminot	Jean-François Jacqueminot	1853	Rousselet	France		
Général Kléber	Jean Baptiste Kléber	1856	Robert	France		
General McArthur	John McArthur	1905	Hill	USA		
Generalsuperior Arnold Janssen	Arnold Janssen	1912	Leenders	The Netherlands		
Général Tétard		1918	Pajotin-Chédane	France		
Generalin Isenbart		1915	Lambert	Germany		
Generaloberst Hindenburg	Paul von Hindenburg	1915	Lambert	Germany		
Generaloberst von Kluck	Alexander von Kluck	1916	Lambert	Germany		
Geoff Hamilton	Geoff Hamilton	1997	Austin	United Kingdom		
Georg Arends	Georg Arends	1910	Hinner	Germany		
George Burns	George Burns	1998	Carruth	USA		
George Dickson	George Dickson	1912	Dickson	United Kingdom		
George Vancouver	George Vancouver	1994	Ogilvie	Canada		
George Will		1939	Skinner	Canada		
Georges de Cadoudel	Georges Cadoudal	1904	Schwartz	France		
Georges Vibert	Jehan Georges Vibert	1853	Robert	France		
Geraldine	Geraldine Pearce	1984	Pearce	United Kingdom		
Gertrud Kiese		1918	Kiese	Germany		
Gertrude Jekyll	Gertrude Jekyll	1986	Austin	United Kingdom		
Ghislaine de Féligonde	Ghislaine de Féligonde	1916	Turbat	France		
Gil Blas	Gil Blas	Before 1843	Van Houtte	France/Belgium		
Gilda	Gilda	1887	Geschwind	Austria-Hungary		
Gina Lollobrigida	Gina Lollobrigida	1988	Meilland	France		
Ginger Rogers	Ginger Rogers	1969	McGredy			
Gitte	Gitte Hænning	1982	Kordes	Germany		
Givenchy	Hubert de Givenchy	1986	Christensen	USA		
Gladys Harkness		1900	Dickson	United Kingdom		
Gloire de Chédane Guinoisseau	Chédane Guinoisseau	1908	Chédane Pajotin	France		
Gneisenau	August Neidhardt von Gneisenau	1924	Lambert	Germany		
Goëthe	Johann Wolfgang von Goethe	1911	Lambert	Germany		
Goldstein	Kurt Goldstein	1983	Cocker	United Kingdom		
Gottfried Keller	Gottfried Keller	1894	Müller	Germany		
Goubault		1835	Hardy	France		
Goya	Francisco Goya	1976	Bees	United Kingdom		
Grace Abounding	John Bunyan	1968	Harkness	United Kingdom		
Grace Darling	Grace Darling	1884	Bennett	United Kingdom		
Grace de Monaco	Grace Kelly	1956	Meilland	France		
Gracie Allen	Gracie Allen					
Graf Fritz von Hochberg	Fritz Reichsgraf von Hochberg	1905	Lambert	Germany		
Graf Fritz von Schwerin	Fritz Graf von Schwerin	1916	Lambert	Germany		
Graf Lennart	Lennart Bernadotte	1991	Meilland	France		
Graf Silva Tarouca		1915	Lambert	Germany		
Gräfin Chotek	Marie Henrieta Chotek	1900	Geschwind	Austria-Hungary		
Gräfin Marie Henriette Chotek	Marie Henrieta Chotek	1911	Kiese	Germany		
Gräfin Sonja	Sonja Bernadotte	1994	Kordes	Germany		
Gräfin Stefanie Wedel		1910	Lambert	Germany		
Gräfin von Hardenberg	Astrid Gräfin von Hardenberg	2001	Tantau	Germany		
Graham Thomas	Graham Stuart Thomas	1983	Austin	United Kingdom		
Grandmère Jenny		1950	Meilland	France		
Grandpa Dickson		1966	Dickson	United Kingdom		
Granny aka 'Bossa Nova'		1991	Olesen	Denmark		
Gretel Greuel		1939	Greuel	Germany		
Grimm	Hans Grimm	1932	Lambert	Germany		
Griseldis	Griseldis	1895	Geschwind	Austria-Hungary		
Großherzog Ernst Ludwig	Ernest Louis	1989	Müller	Germany		
Großherzog Friedrich von Baden	Frederick II	1908	Lambert	Germany		
Großherzog von Oldenburg	Friedrich August II	1904	Welter	Germany		
Großherzog Wilhelm Ernst von Sachsen	William Ernest	1915	Welter	Germany		
Großherzogin Alexandra	Princess Alexandra of Hanover	1904	Jacobs	Germany		
Großherzogin Feodora von Sachsen	Feodora von Sachsen-Meiningen	1913	Kiese	Germany		
Großherzogin Luise von Baden	Princess Louise of Prussia	1893	Welter	Germany		
Großherzogin Marie	Duchess Marie of Mecklenburg-Schwerin	1912	Jacobs	Germany		
Großherzogin Viktoria Melitta	Princess Victoria Melita	1898	Lambert	Germany		
Guillaume Kaempff		1931	Felberg	Germany		
Gustav Grünerwald		1903	Lambert	Germany		
Gustav Sobry		1902	Welter	Germany		
Gustel Mayer		1909	Lambert	Germany		
Guy de Maupassant	Guy de Maupassant	1994	Meilland	France		
Guy Savoy	Guy Savoy	2002	Delbard	France		

Top of page

== H ==
Name of variety	Namesake	Date	Rose breeder	Location	Image	Ref
H. C. Andersen	Hans Christian Andersen	Before 1986	Olesen	Denmark		
H. F. Eilers		1914	Lambert	Germany		
Händel	George Frideric Handel	1965	McGredy	Ireland		
Hannah Gordon	Hannah Gordon	1973	Kordes	Germany		
Hanneaka Hannah	Hanne Soenderhousen	1959	Soenderhousen	Denmark		
Hans Rathgeb	Hans Rathgeb	2004	Huber	Switzerland		
Hans Rosenthal	Hans Rosenthal	1987	Meilland	France		
Harald Wohlfahrt	Harald Wohlfahrt	2003	Delbard	France		
Harry Maasz	Harry Maasz	1939	Kordes	Germany		
Harry Wheatcroft	Harry Wheatcroft	1971	Wheatcroft	United Kingdom		
Hauff	Wilhelm Hauff	1911	Lambert	Germany		
Hauptmann A. Steinsdorfer		1890	Geschwind	Austria-Hungary		
Heather Austin		1996	Austin	United Kingdom		
Heather Muir	Heather Muir	1957	Sunningdale Nurseries	United Kingdom		
Hedi Grimm	Hedwig Grimm	1970	Scholle	Germany		
Hedwig Reicher	Hedwig Reicher-Kindermann	1912	Hinner	Germany		
Heidi	Heidi	1978	Christensen	USA		
Heidi Klum	Heidi Klum	1999	Tantau	Germany		
Hein Evers	Hein Evers	1957	Tantau	Germany		
Heine	Heinrich Heine	1912	Lambert	Germany		
Heinrich Blanc	Heinrich Blanc	1994	Hetzel	Germany		
Heinrich Conrad Söth	Heinrich Conrad Söth	1919	Lambert	Germany		
Heinrich Karsch	Heinrich Karsch	1927	Leenders	Netherlands		
Heinrich Münch		1911	Hinner	Germany		
Heinrich Schultheis	Heinrich Schultheis	1882	Bennett	United Kingdom		
Heinrich Siesmayer	Heinrich Siesmayer	1996	McGredy	New Zealand		
Heinz Erhardt	Heinz Erhardt	1984	Kordes	Germany		
Heinz Winkler	Heinz Winkler		Delbard	France		
Helen Hawes	Helen Hawes	2012	Burntwood	United Kingdom		
Helen Hayes	Helen Hayes	1956	Brownell			
Helene Welter		1903	Welter	Germany		
Helene von Zwehl	Helene von Zwehl	1915	Lambert	Germany		
Helga		1975	De Ruiter	Netherlands		
Helmut Kohl Rose	Helmut Kohl	1996	Tantau	Germany		
Helmut Schmidt	Helmut Schmidt	1979	Kordes	Germany		
Henri IV	Henry IV of France	1862	Verdier	France		
Henri Barruet		1918	Barbier	France		
Henri Fouquier		Before 1842		France		
Henri Martin	Henri Martin	1863	Laffay	France		
Henri Matisse	Henri Matisse	1995	Delbard	France		
Henriette Boulogne		1845		France		
Henry Fonda	Henry Fonda	1995	Christensen	USA		
Henry Ford	Henry Ford	1927	Devermann	USA		
Henry Hudson	Henry Hudson	1976	Svejda	Canada		
Henry Kelsey	Henry Kelsey	1984	Svejda	Canada		
Henry Nevard		1924	Cant	Germany		
Herkules	Hercules	2007	Kordes	Germany		
Hermann Berger	Hermann Berger	1982	Roter Oktober	East-Germany		
Hermann Hesse	Hermann Hesse	Before 2008	Noack	Germany		
Hermann Kegel		1848	Portemer	France		
Hermann Kiese	Hermann Kiese	1906	Geduldig	Austria-Hungary		
Hermann Lüder	Hermann Lüder	1910	Kiese	Germany		
Hermann Raue		1905	Lambert	Germany		
Hermann Robinow	Hermann Robinow	1918	Lambert	Germany		
Hermann Schmidt	Hermann Schmidt	1986	Hetzel	Germany		
Hermann Teschendorff		1950	Berger	Germany		
Herrin von Lieser		1905	Lambert	Germany		
Herrmann Coenemann		1907	Welter	Germany		
Herzog Friedrich von Anhalt	Friedrich II	1906	Welter	Germany		
Herzog Johann Albrecht	Johann Albrecht	1913	Jacobs	Germany		
Herzog Karl Eduard	Charles Edward	1909	Jacobs	Germany		
Herzog Viktor von Ratibor	Viktor II	1918	Welter	Germany		
Herzog von Windsor	Edward VIII	1968	Tantau	Germany		
Herzogin Marie Antoinette	Duchess Marie of Mecklenburg	1911	Jacobs	Germany		
Herzogin Marie von Ratibor	Countess Marie Breuner-Enckevoirt	1898	Lambert	Germany		
Herzogin von Calabrien	Princess Maria Ludwiga Theresia of Bavaria	1914	Lambert	Germany		
Hiawatha	Hiawatha	1904	Walsh	USA		
Hilda Murrell	Hilda Murrell	1984	Austin	United Kingdom		
Hindenburg	Paul von Hindenburg	1916	Kiese	Germany		
Hippolyte	Hippolyta	Before 1842	Parmentier	Belgium		
Hoffmann von Fallersleben	August Heinrich Hoffmann von Fallersleben	1917	Lambert	Germany		
Hofgartendirektor Graebener	Leopold Graebener	1899	Lambert	Germany		
Hofgärtner Kalb		1913	Felberg	Germany		
Homère	Homer	1858	Moreau-Robert	France		
Honest Abe	Abraham Lincoln	1978	Christensen			
Honoré de Balzac	Honoré de Balzac	1994	Meilland	France		
Honorine de Brabant		1916	Tanne	France		
Horace Vernet	Horace Vernet	1866	Guillot	France		
Horstmann's Bergfeuer	Adolf Horstmann	1954	Horstmann /Kordes	Germany		
Hortense de Beauharnais	Hortense de Beauharnais	1834	Vibert	France		
Hugh Dickson	Hugh Dickson	1904	Dickson	United Kingdom		
Hume's Blush Tea-scented China	Abraham Hume	1810	Hume	United Kingdom		

Top of page

== I ==
Name of variety	Namesake	Date	Rose breeder	Location	Image	Ref
Ida Costain	Ida Costain	1955		Canada		
Ignasi Iglésias	Ignasi Iglésias	1934		Spain		
Ilse Haberland	Ilse Haberland	1956	Kordes	Germany		
Ilse Krohn		1964	Kordes	Germany		
Immortal Juno	Juno	1983	Austin	United Kingdom		
Impératrice Eugénie	Eugénie de Montijo	1855	Béluze	France		
Impératrice Eugénie	Eugénie de Montijo	1856	Guillot	France		
Impératrice Joséphine	Joséphine de Beauharnais	Before 1815	Descemet	France		
Impératrice Joséphine	Joséphine de Beauharnais	1853		France		
Indira	Indira Gandhi	1973	Hetzel	Germany		
Infante Beatrice	Princess Beatrice	1930	Guillot	France		
Ingrid Bergman	Ingrid Bergman	1984	Olesen	Denmark		
Ingrid Weibull		1980	Tantau	Germany		
Irene Churruca		1934	Fojo	Spain		
Irene of Denmark	Princess Irene	1948	Poulsen	Denmark		
Irène Watts	Irène Watts	1896	Guillot	France		
Isobel Derby		1993	Horner	United Kingdom		
Isobel Harkness		1957	Harkness	United Kingdom		

Top of page

== J ==
Name of variety	Namesake	Date	Rose breeder	Location	Image	Ref
J. H. Pemberton	Joseph Pemberton	1931	Bentall	United Kingdom		
J. J. Audubon	John James Audubon	2006	Shoup	USA		
J. L. Monk		1923	Timmermans	United Kingdom		
J.P. Connell	J. P. Connell	1973	Svejda	Canada		
Jacqueline du Pré aka 'Harwanna'	Jacqueline du Pré	1989	Harkness	United Kingdom		
Jacqueline Humery		1995	Lens	Belgium		
Jacques Cartier	Jacques Cartier	1868	Moreau-Robert	France		
Jacques Esterel		1968	Croix	France		
Jacques Porcher		1914	Guillot	France		
James Galway	James Galway	2000	Austin	United Kingdom		
James Mason	James Mason	1982	Beales	United Kingdom		
James Mitchell		1861	Verdier	France		
James Veitch	James Veitch	1854	Verdier	France		
Jan Spek		1966	McGredy	Ireland		
Jane Asher	Jane Asher	1987	Pearce	United Kingdom		
Janet B. Wood		1989	Beales	United Kingdom		
Janetta		1995	Sievers	Germany		
Jaquenetta	Jaquenetta	1983	Austin	United Kingdom		
Jayne Austin	Jayne Austin	1990	Austin	United Kingdom		
Jean Giono	Jean Giono	1994	Meilland	France		
Jean Lafitte	Jean Lafitte	1934	Horvath	USA		
Jean Liabaud	Jean Liabaud	1875	Liabaud	France		
Jean Stéphenne	Jean Stéphenne	2006	Velle	Belgium		
Jeanie Deans	Jeanie Deans	1895	Penzance	United Kingdom		
Jeanne Bouyer		1877	Gonod	France		
Jeanne d'Arc	Joan of Arc	1818	Vibert	France		
Jeanne de Montfort	Jeanne de Montfort	1851	Robert	France		
Jeanne Moreau	Jeanne Moreau	2005	Meilland	France		
Jens Munk	Jens Munk	1974		Canada		
Jenny Duval	Jenny Duval	Before 1846	Duval	France		
Jill Dando	Jill Dando	1999	Beales	United Kingdom		
Jimmy Greaves	Jimmy Greaves	1940	Gandy	United Kingdom		
Joanna Hill	Joanna Hill	1927	Hill	USA		
Joasine Hanet		1847	Vibert	France		
Johann Strauss	Johann Strauss II	1993	Meilland	France		
Johannes Rau	Johannes Rau	2001	Noack	Germany		
Johannes Wesselhöft	Johannes Wesselhöft	1899	Welter	Germany		
John Bright	John Bright	1878	Paul	United Kingdom		
John Cabot	John Cabot	1978	Svejda	Canada		
John Clare	John Clare	1994	Austin	United Kingdom		
John Cook	John Cook	1917	Krüger	Germany		
John Davis	John Davis	1986	Svejda	Canada		
John Franklin	John Franklin	1971	Svejda	Canada		
John F. Kennedy	John F. Kennedy	1965	Boerner	USA		
John Grooms	John Alfred Groom	1993	Beales	United Kingdom		
John Hopper	John Hopper	1862	Ward	United Kingdom		
John S. Armstrong	John S. Armstrong	Before 1958	Swim	USA		
John Ystumllyn Rose	John Ystumllyn	2021	Harkness	United Kingdom		
Johnnie Walker	Johnnie Walker	1982	Fryer	United Kingdom		
José Carréras	José Carréras	1998	Poulsen	Denmark		
Josef Klimeš		1985	Urban	Czech Republic		
Joseph F. Lamb	Joseph Lamb	1988	Buck	USA		
Joseph Liger	François Joseph Liger	1909	Barbier	France		
Joseph's Coat	Joseph	1969	Swim/Armstrong	USA		
Josephine Bruce		1950	Bees	United Kingdom		
Joséphine de Beauharnais	Joséphine de Beauharnais	1823	Vibert	France		
Josephine Ritter		1900	Geschwind	Austria-Hungary		
Josie Whitney		2000	Harkness	United Kingdom		
Quadra Rose	Juan Francisco de la Bodega y Quadra			Canada		
Jubilé du Prince de Monaco aka 'Cherry Parfait'	Rainier III	2000	Meilland	France		
Jude the Obscure	Jude the Obscure	1995	Austin	United Kingdom		
Judy Garland	Judy Garland	1978	Harkness	USA		
Jules Margottin	Jacques Julien Margottin	1853	Margottin	France		
Julia Child aka 'Absolutely Fabulous'	Julia Child	2004	Carruth	USA		
Julia Festilla	Julia Festilla	1900	Geschwind	Austria-Hungary		
Julia Mannering	Julia Mannering	1895	Penzance	United Kingdom		
Julia's Rose aka 'Chocolate Rose'	Julia Clements	1976	Wisbech Plant	United Kingdom		
Julie Andrews	Julie Andrews					
Julie de Mersan	Julie de Mersan	1854	Thomas	USA		
Julien Potin	Julien Potin	1927	Pernet-Ducher	France		
Juliet	Juliet Capulet	1910	Paul	United Kingdom		
Juliette	Juliet Capulet	Before 1828	Miellez	France		
Juliette Gréco	Juliette Gréco	1999	Delbard	France		
Julius Fabianics de Misefa		1890	Geschwind	Austria-Hungary		
June Whitfield	June Whitfield	1925	Harkness	United Kingdom		
Juno	Juno	Before 1820				
Juno (II)	Juno (II)	1847	Laffay	France		
Just Joey	Joey Pawsey	1972	Pawsey	United Kingdom		
Justino Henriquez		1926	Guillot	France		
Justizrat Dr. Hessert		1918	Lambert	Germany		

Top of page

== K ==
Name of variety	Namesake	Date	Rose breeder	Location	Image	Ref
Kaiser Franz Joseph	Franz Joseph I of Austria	1915	Lambert	Germany		
Kaiser Wilhelm I	Wilhelm I	1878	Elze/Ruschpler	Germany		
Kaiser Wilhelm II	Wilhelm II	1909	Jacobs	Germany		
Kaiserin Auguste Viktoria	Augusta Viktoria of Schleswig-Holstein	1891	Lambert	Germany		
Kaiserin Farah	Farah Pahlavi	1965	Kordes	Germany		
Kaiserin Friedrich	Princess Victoria	1889	Drogemüller	Germany		
Kaiserin Zita	Zita of Bourbon-Parma	1965	Kordes	Germany		
Kammersänger Terkal	Karl Terkal	1971	Tantau	Germany		
Kapitän von Müller	Karl von Müller	1915	Lambert	Germany		
Karen Blixen aka Roy Black	Karen Blixen	1994	Olesen	Denmark		
Karl Foerster	Karl Foerster	1931	Kordes	Germany		
Karl Heinz Hanisch	Karl Heinz Hanisch	1986	Meilland	France		
Karl Herbst		1950	Kordes	Germany		
Karl Höchst		1983	Hetzel	Germany		
Karl Ploberger Rose		2007	Kordes	Germany		
Käte Felberg		1930	Felberg	Germany		
Katharina Mock		1942	Mock	Germany		
Katharina von Bora	Katharina von Bora	2006	Schultheis	Germany		
Katharina Zeimet		1901	Lambert	Germany		
Käthe Duvigneau	Käthe Duvigneau	1942	Tantau	Germany		
Kathleen		1922	Pemberton	United Kingdom		
Kathleen Ferrier	Kathleen Ferrier	1952	Buisman	Netherlands		
Kathleen Harrop		1919	Dickson	United Kingdom		
Kathryn McGredy		1996	McGredy	New Zealand		
Kathryn Morley		1990	Austin	United Kingdom		
Kean	Edmund Kean		Laffay	France		
Kessi		1999	Schultheis	Germany		
Kiese	Hermann Kiese	1910	Kiese	Germany		
Kirsten Klein	Kirsten Klein	1995	Scarman	United Kingdom		
Kirsten Poulsen		1924	Poulsen	Denmark		
Kitchener of Khartoum	Herbert Kitchener	1917	Dickson	United Kingdom		
Kitty's Rose	Kitty Cameron	2003	Beales	United Kingdom		
Kleopatra	Cleopatra VII	1994	Kordes	Germany		
Kommerzienrat W. Rautenstrauch	Wilhelm Rautenstrauch	1909	Lambert	Germany		
König Laurin	King Laurin	1910	Türke	Germany		
König-Ludwig-Rose	Ludwig II	1994	Tantau	Germany		
Königin Beatrix	Beatrix	1983	Kordes	Germany		
Königin Carola von Sachen	Carola	1904	Türke	Germany		
Königin von Dänemark	Marie Sophie of Hesse-Kassel	1826	Booth	Denmark		
Königin Margarethe	Margrethe II	1994	Olesen	Denmark		
Königin Maria Therese	Maria Therese	1916	Lambert	Germany		
Konrad Adenauer	Konrad Adenauer	1953	Tantau	Germany		
Konrad Henkel	Konrad Henkel	1983	Kordes	Germany		
Körner	Theodor Körner	1914	Lambert			
Kronprinz Rupprecht	Ruprecht	1915	Lambert	Germany		
Kronprinz Wilhelm	William	1916	Lambert	Germany		
Kronprinzessin Cecilie	Duchess Cecilie	1907	Kiese	Germany		
Kronprinzessin Viktoria	Princess Victoria	1888	Vollert	Germany		
Kronprinzessin Viktoria (II)	Crown Princess Victoria	1986	Hetzel	Germany		

Top of page

== L ==
Name of variety	Namesake	Date	Rose breeder	Location	Image	Ref
Lady Banks	Dorothea Hugesson	1807	Boursault	France		
Lady Curzon	Mary Curzon	1901	Turner	United Kingdom		
Lady Di	Diana Huber	1982	Huber	Switzerland		
Lady Edgeworth David	Cara David	1939	Fitzhardinge	Australia		
Lady Emily Peel	Emily, Lady Peel	1862	Lacharme	France		
Lady Emma Hamilton	Emma, Lady Hamilton	2005	Austin	United Kingdom		
Lady Gowrie	Zara Hore-Ruthven	1938	Fitzhardinge	Australia		
Lady Gray	Ethel Eveleen Gray-Campbell	1905	Geschwind	Austria-Hungary		
Lady Helen Stuart		1887	Dickson	United Kingdom		
Lady Hillingdon	Alice Marion Harbord	1910	Lowe & Shawyer	United Kingdom		
Lady Mary FitzWilliam	Lady Mary FitzWilliam	1882	Bennett	United Kingdom		
Lady Mavis Pilkington	Mavis Pilkington	1992	Kordes	Germany		
Lady of Megginch	Cherry Drummond	2007	Austin	United Kingdom		
Lady Mitchell	Margaret Mitchell	1991	Harkness	United Kingdom		
Lady Monson	Maria Maude		Monson	United Kingdom		
Lady Penzance	Lady Mary Bouverie	1894	Penzance	United Kingdom		
Lady Romsey	Penelope Meredith Eastwood	1985	Beales	United Kingdom		
Lady Sylvia	Sylvia Ashley	1926	Stevens	USA		
Lady Ursula		1908	Dickson	United Kingdom		
Lamarque	Jean Maximilien Lamarque	1830		France		
Lambert Closse	Lambert Closse	1995	Ogilvie/Svejda	Canada		
Laura Ashley	Laura Ashley	1991	Warner	United Kingdom		
Laura Ford	Laura Ford	1990	Warner	United Kingdom		
Laure Davoust		1834	Laffay	France		
Laurent Carle	Laurent Carle	1907	Pernet-Ducher	France		
Laurent de Rillé	François Anatole Laurent de Rillé	1885	Lévêque	France		
Lawinia	Lavinia Fitzalan-Howard	1980	Tantau	Germany		
Lawrence Johnston aka 'Hidcote Yellow'	Lawrence Waterbury Johnston	1923	Pernet-Ducher	France		
Leander	Leander	1982	Austin	United Kingdom		
LeAnn Rimes	LeAnn Rimes					
Léda aka 'Painted Damask'	Leda	Before 1827		United Kingdom		
Leonard Dudley Braithwaite	L. D. Braithwaite	1988	Austin	United Kingdom		
Leonardo da Vinci	Leonardo da Vinci	1993	Meilland	France		
Leonie Lambert	Leonie Lambert	1913	Lambert	Germany		
Leonie Lamesch	Leonie Lambert	1899	Lambert	Germany		
Léontine Gervais	Charles Gervais	1903	Barbier	France		
Leopold Ritter	Leopold von Sacher-Masoch	1900	Geschwind	Austria-Hungary		
Lessing	Gotthold Ephraim Lessing	1914	Lambert	Germany		
Leveson Gower	Granville Leveson-Gower	1846	Béluze	France		
Lilian Austin	Lilian Austin	1973	Austin	United Kingdom		
Lilian Baylis	Lilian Baylis	1996	Harkness	United Kingdom		
Lili Marleen	Lili Marleen	1959	Kordes	Germany		
Lilli von Posern		1910	Kiese	Germany		
Lina Schmidt-Michel	Lina Schmidt-Michel	1906	Lambert	Germany		
Linda Campbell		1990	Moore	USA		
Linda Porter	Linda Lee Thomas	1957	Dot	Spain		
Line Renaud aka 'Meiclusif'	Line Renaud	2006	Meilland	France		
Lisbeth Stellmacher		1919	Lambert	Germany		
Lisbeth von Kamecke		1910	Kiese	Germany		
Liv Tyler aka 'Comtesse de Provence'	Liv Tyler	2005	Meilland	France		
Long John Silver	Long John Silver	1934	Horvath	USA		
Lord Byron	Lord Byron	1991	Meilland	France		
Lord Penzance	James Wilde	1894	Penzance	United Kingdom		
Lord Raglan	FitzRoy Somerset	1854	Guillot	France		
Loreley	Lorelei	1982	Noack	Germany		
Louis Bulliat		1867	Gonod	France		
Louis de Funès	Louis de Funès	1984	Meilland	France		
Louis Donadine		1887	Gonod	France		
Louis Gimard		1877	Pernet-Ducher	France		
Louis Jolliet	Louis Jolliet	1990		Canada		
Louis Kahle		1922	Kiese	Germany		
Louis Rödiger		1935	Kordes	Germany		
Louis Rollet	Louis Rollet	1887	Gonod	France		
Louis van Tyll		Before 1846				
Louis-Philippe	Louis-Philippe I	1824		France		
Louisa Stone		1997	Harkness	United Kingdom		
Louise Bugnet		1960	Bugnet	Canada		
Louise Clements	Louise Clements	1998	Clements	USA		
Louise Cretté		1815	Chambard	France		
Louise Hay	Louise Hay	2008		USA		
Louise Odier	Louise Odier	1851	Margottin	France		
Lucetta	Lucetta Templeman	1983	Austin	United Kingdom		
Lucie Crampton aka 'Maryse Kriloff' aka 'Lucy Cramphorn'		1960	Kriloff	France		
Lucie Duplessis		1853	Robert	France		
Lucien de Lemos		1905	Lambert	Germany		
Lucille Ball	Lucille Ball					
Lucy Ashton						
Ludmilla	Ludmila Belousova	1968	Laperrière	France		
Ludwig Möller		1915	Kiese	Germany		
Luise Krause		1930	Krause	Germany		
Luise Lilia		1912	Lambert	Germany		
Luna	Luna	1825	Poulsen	Denmark		
Lydia		1973	Kordes	Germany		
Lydia Geschwind	Lydia Geschwind	1890	Geschwind	Austria-Hungary		
Lydia Grimm		1907	Geduldig	Germany		
Lynn Anderson	Lynn Anderson					

Top of page

== M ==
Name of variety	Namesake	Date	Rose breeder	Location	Image	Ref
M. Geier	Michael Geier	1929	Felberg	Germany		
Mabel Morrison		1878	Broughton	United Kingdom		
Madame A. Meilland aka 'Peace'	Claudia Meilland	1942	Meilland	France		
Madame Abel Chatenay		1894	Pernet-Ducher	France		
Madame Adélaïde de Meynot	Adélaïde de Meynot	1882	Gonod	France		
Madame Alfred Carrière		1879	Schwartz	France		
Madame Anna Bugnet		1866	Gonod	France		
Madame Antoine Mari		1901	Mari/Japeau	France		
Madame Ballu		1901	l'Haÿ	France		
Madame Bardou Job		1913	Dubreuil	France		
Madame Bérard		1872	Levet	France		
Madame Boll		1859	Boll/Boeyeau	France		
Madame Bouyer		1877	Gonod	France		
Madame Bovary	Emma Bovary	2001	Delbard	France		
Madame Bravy		1846	Guillot	France		
Madame Caroline Testout	Caroline Testout	1890	Pernet-Ducher	France		
Madame Caroline Testout Climbing	Caroline Testout	1901	Chauvry	France		
Madame Céline Touvais		1859	Touvais	France		
Madame Charles Baltet		1877	Verdier	France		
Madame Chiang Kai-Shek	Soong Mei-ling	1942	Duehrsen			
Madame Clémence Joigneau		1861	Liabaud	France		
Madame Clert		1868	Gonod	France		
Madame Creyton		1868	Gonod	France		
Madame d'Enfert		1904	Vilin	France		
Madame David		1885	Pernet-Ducher	France		
Madame de la Rôchelambert		1851	Robert	France		
Madame de Pompadour	Madame de Pompadour	1945	Gaujard	France		
Madame de Sansal		1850	De Sansal	France		
Madame de Tartas		1859	Bernède	France		
Madame de Villars		1847	Béluze	France		
Madame Delbard		1980	Delbard	France		
Madame Denis		1872	Gonod	France		
Madame Edmond Rostand	Rosemonde Gérard	1912	Pernet-Ducher	France		
Madame Édouard Herriot	Blanche Herriot	1914	Pernet-Ducher	France		
Madame Édouard Herriot	Blanche Herriot	1921	Ketten	Luxemburg		
Madame Edouard Ory		1854	Robert	France		
Madame Elie Lambert		1890	Lambert	Germany		
Madame Emma Combay		1872	Gonod	France		
Madame Ernest Calvat	Marie Perrin	1888	Schwartz	France		
Madame Ernest Levavasseur		1900	Vigneron	France		
Madame Eugène Chambeyran		1879	Gonod	France		
Madame Eugène Labruyère		1882/1883	Gonod	France		
Madame Eugène Savary		1873	Gonod	France		
Madame Eugénie Frémy	Eugénie Frémy	1885	Verdier	France		
Madame Falcot		1858	Guillot	France		
Madame Ferdinand Jamin aka 'American Beauty'		1875	Lédéchaux	France		
Madame Figaro		2001	Delbard	France		
Madame Fillion		1865	Gonod	France		
Madame Gabriel Luizet		1877	Liabaud	France		
Madame Georges Bruant	Amélie Bruant	1887	Bruant	France		
Madame Gonod		1875	Gonod	France		
Madame Grégoire Staechelin		1927	Dot	Spain		
Madame Grondier		1867	Gonod	France		
Madame Guillot de Mont Favez		1871	Gonod	France		
Madame Gustave Bonnet aka 'Zephirine Drouhin'		1896	Bizot	France		
Madame Hardy	Félicité Hardy	1832	Hardy	France		
Madame Hermann Stenger		1864	Gonod	France		
Madame Hippolyte Dumas		1924	Guillot	France		
Madame Hoste		1865	Gonod	France		
Madame Hoste		1887	Guillot	France		
Madame Isaac Pereire	Madame Isaac Péreire	1881	Garçon	France		
Madame Jean Everaerts		1907	Geduldig	Germany		
Madame Jeanne Bouger		1876	Gonod	France		
Madame Joseph Schwartz		1880	Schwartz	France		
Madame Jules Bouché		1911	Croibier	France		
Madame Jules Gravereaux		1901	Soupert/Notting	Luxembourg		
Madame Knorr		1865	Verdier	France		
Madame Lacharme		1872	Lacharme	France		
Madame Laurette Messimy		1888	Guillot	France		
Madame Lauriol de Barny		1868	Trouillard	France		
Madame Legras de St. Germain		1848		France		
Madame Léon Pain		1904	Guillot	France		
Madame Léon Simon		1909	Lambert	Germany		
Madame Liabaud		1869	Gonod	France		
Madame Lombard		1878	Lacharme	France		
Madame Louis Donadine		1877	Gonod	France		
Madame Louis Laperrière		1951	Laperrière	France		
Madame Louis Lévêque		1898	Leveque	France		
Madame Louise Piron		1903	Piron-Médard	France		
Madame Marie Garnier		1881	Gonod	France		
Madame Maurice Rivoire		1878	Gonod	France		
Madame Moreau		1864	Gonod	France		
Madame Moreau		1872	Moreau-Robert	France		
Madame Norbert Levavasseur		1903	Levavasseur	France		
Madame Paule Massad		1997	Guillot-Massad	France		
Madame Pierre Oger	Modeste Davy	1878	Oger	France		
Madame Plantier aka 'The Bride's Rose'		1835	Plantier	France		
Madame Raymond Poincaré	Henriette Poincaré	1919	Gravereaux	France		
Madame Richter		1886	Geschwind	Austria-Hungary		
Madame Rival		1866	Gonod	France		
Madame Rollet		1875	Gonod	France		
Madame Sancy de Parabère		1874	Bonnet	France		
Madame Schultz		1856	Béluze	France		
Madame Ségond Weber	Eugénie Segond-Weber	1908	Soupert/Notting	France		
Madame Sophie Charlotte	Sophia Charlotte of Hanover	1986	Weihrauch	Germany		
Madame Soubeyran		1872	Gonod	France		
Madame Souveton		1874	Pernet	France		
Madame Suzanne Chavagnon		1887	Gonod	France		
Madame Victor Verdier	Madeleine Verdier	1863	Verdier	France		
Madame Wagram, Comtesse de Turenne		1894		France		
Madame Mélanie Willermoz		1845	Lacharme	France		
Madame William Paul		1869	Moreau-Robert	France		
Mademoiselle Blanche Lafitte	Blanche Lafitte	1851	Pradel	France		
Mademoiselle Claire Andruejol		1920	Schwartz	France		
Mademoiselle de Sombreuil	Maurille de Sombreuil	1850	Robert	France		
Mademoiselle Eugénie Verdier		1869	Guillot fils	France		
Mademoiselle Franziska Krüger		1880	Nabonnand	France		
Mademoiselle Julia Dumonier		1879	Gonod	France		
Mademoiselle Marie Gonod		1871	Gonod	France		
Mademoiselle Marie Magat		1889	Liabaud	France		
Mademoiselle Philiberte Pellet		1873	Gonod	France		
Mademoiselle Suzanne Bouyer		1879	Gonod	France		
Magda Zwerg		1904	Jacobs	Germany		
Maja Oetker	Maja Oetker	1981	Cocker	United Kingdom		
Major Franz Teirich		1888	Geschwind	Austria-Hungary		
Mala Rubinstein	Mala Rubinstein	1971	Dickson	United Kingdom		
Malvina		1841	Verdier	France		
Mama Lamesch		1923	Löbner/Lambert	Germany		
Maman Cochet		1893	Cochet	France		
Manette aka 'Nanette'		Before 1874	Lecoffé	France		
Manou Meilland	Louisette Meilland	1978	Meilland	France		
Manuel Canovas	Manuel Canovas	1995	Guillot-Massad	France		
Marc-Antoine Charpentier	Marc-Antoine Charpentier	2005	Massad	France		
Marc Bolan	Marc Bolan	2012	Cocker	United Kingdom		
Marcel Bourgouin		1898	Corboeuf-Marsault	France		
Marcel Pagnol	Marcel Pagnol	1996	Meilland	France		
Marchioness of Lorne	Princess Louise	1889	Paul	United Kingdom		
Marco Polo	Marco Polo	1991	Meilland	France		
Maréchal Davoust	Louis-Nicolas Davout	1853	Robert	France		
Maréchal Niel	Adolphe Niel	1864	Pradel	France		
Margaret Dickson		1892	Dickson	United Kingdom		
Margaret McGredy		1927	McGredy	Ireland		
Margaret Merril		1977	Harkness	United Kingdom		
Margaret Thatcher	Margaret Thatcher			Pakistan		
Margarete Gnau		1930	Krause	Germany		
Margarete Heike		1914	Lambert	Germany		
Margarita		1924	Alfons	Germany		
Margo Koster		1931	Koster	Germany		
Marguerite de Roman		1882	Schwartz	France		
Marguerite Hilling aka 'Pink Nevada'		1959	Hilling	United Kingdom		
Maria			Sievers	Germany		
Maria Callas aka 'Miss All-American Beauty'	Maria Callas	1965	Meilland	France		
Maria Hofker	Maria Hofker	1993	Interplant	Netherlands		
Maria Lisa aka 'Maria Liesa'		1925	Alfons	Germany		
Maria von Weber		1893	Türke	Germany		
Mariandel aka 'The Times Rose' aka 'Carl Philip Kristian IV'	Marianne Kordes	1985	Kordes	Germany		
Marianne Pfitzer		1902	Jacobs	Germany		
Maribel		1991	Cocker	United Kingdom		
Marie Accarie		1872	Guillot	France		
Marie Antoinette	Marie Antoinette	1968	Armstrong	USA		
Marie Antoinette II	Marie Antoinette	2003	Tantau	Germany		
Marie Baumann	Marie Baumann	1863	Baumann	France		
Marie Bülow	Marie Bülow	1903	Welter	Germany		
Marie Bugnet	Marie Bugnet	1963	Bugnet	Canada		
Marie Claire Climbing	Marie Claire	1944	Meilland	France		
Marie Curie	Marie Curie	1997	Meilland	France		
Marie d'Orléans	Princess Marie	1883	Nabonnand	France		
Marie de Blois	Marie I	1852	Robert	France		
Marie de Bourgogne	Mary of Burgundy	1853	Robert	France		
Marie de Saint Jean		1852	Damaizin	France		
Marie Dermar aka 'Marie Dermat'		1889	Geschwind	Austria-Hungary		
Marie Faist		1925	Berger	Germany		
Marie François Sadi Carnot	Marie François Sadi Carnot	1894	Pernet-Ducher	France		
Marie Geschwind	Marie Geschwind	1889	Geschwind	Austria-Hungary		
Marie Gouchault	Marie Gouchault	1927	Turbat	France		
Marie Helene		1991	Weihrauch	Germany		
Marie Henriette Gräfin Chotek	Marie Henrieta Chotek	1920	Lambert	Germany		
Marie Herzogin von Anhalt	Marie of Baden	1909	Jacobs	Germany		
Marie Jeanne		1913	Turbat	France		
Marie Lambert	Marie Lambert	1889	Lambert	Germany		
Marie Louise	Marie Louise	1813	Malmaison	France		
Marie Louise Pernet		1876	Pernet	France		
Marie-Luise Marjan	Marie-Luise Marjan	1999	Kordes	Germany		
Marie Pavié	Marie Pavié	1888	Allégatière	France		
Marie Tudor	Mary I of England	Before 1846				
Marie-Victorin	Marie-Victorin	1984	Svedja	Canada		
Marietta Biolley		1875	Gonod	France		
Marilyn Monroe	Marilyn Monroe	2002	Carruth	USA		
Marinette	Marinette Berry	1995	Austin	United Kingdom		
Marion aka 'Salmon Sensation'		1956	De Ruiter	Netherlands		
Marion Harkness		1979	Harkness	United Kingdom		
Marion Hess		1981	Hetzel	Germany		
Marjorie Fair		1978	Harkness	United Kingdom		
Marjorie Marshall		1996	Harkness	United Kingdom		
Marjorie Proops	Marjorie Proops	1969	Harkness	United Kingdom		
Mark Twain	Mark Twain	2000	Huber	Switzerland		
Marlena	Marlene Dietrich	1964	Kordes	Germany		
Marlene Charell	Marlene Charell	2007	Wänninger	Germany		
Marquesa de Urquijo aka 'Pilar Landecho'	Pilar Landecho	1940	Camprubi	Spain		
Martha		1912	Zeiner	France		
Martha Lambert		1936	Lambert			
Martin Frobisher	Martin Frobisher	1968	Svejda	Canada		
Martin Liebau		1930	Kiese	Germany		
Martine Guillot		1996	Guillot-Massad	France		
Marty (II)		1947	Pearce	United Kingdom		
Mary Donaldson	Mary Donaldson	1984	Cant	United Kingdom		
Mary Hayley Bell	Mary Hayley Bell	1989	Kordes	Germany		
Mary MacKillop	Mary MacKillop	1985		Australia		
Mary Magdalene	Mary Magdalene	1998	Austin	United Kingdom		
Mary Manners		1970	Leicester Rose Company	United Kingdom		
Mary Margaret McBride	Mary Margaret McBride	1943	Nicolas	USA		
Mary, Queen of Scots	Mary, Queen of Scots	19th century				
Mary Webb	Mary Webb	1984	Austin	United Kingdom		
Master Hugh	Hugh Scallan	1966	Mason	United Kingdom		
Maude Elizabeth	Maude Elizabeth Beales	2000	Beales	United Kingdom		
Maupertuis	Pierre Louis Maupertuis	1888	Moreau-Robert	France		
Maurice Bernardin		1861	Granger/Lévêque	France		
Maurice Utrillo	Maurice Utrillo	2004	Delbard	France		
Max Graf	Max Graf	1919	Bowditsch	USA		
Max Hesdörffer	Max Hesdörffer	1902	Jacobs	Germany		
Max Krause	Max Krause	1930	Krause	Germany		
Max Schmeling	Max Schmeling	1973	Tantau	Germany		
Mayor of Casterbridge	The Mayor of Casterbridge	1996	Austin	United Kingdom		
The McCartney Rose	Paul McCartney	1996	Meilland	France		
Mécène	Gaius Maecenas	1846	Vibert	France		
Mechtilde von der Neuerburg	Mechthild of Sayn	1920	Boden	Germany		
Meg Merrilies	Meg Merrilies	1894	Penzance	United Kingdom		
Mercedes		1886	Geschwind	Austria-Hungary		
Mevrouw Nathalie Nypels		1919	Leenders	Netherlands		
Michael Crawford	Michael Crawford					
Michel Bras	Michel Bras	2002	Delbard	France		
Michel Dupré		1876	Gonod	France		
Michelangelo	Michelangelo	1997	Meilland	France		
Michele Meilland		1945	Meilland	France		
Mildred Scheel	Mildred Scheel	1976	Tantau	Germany		
The Miller	Philip Miller	1970	Austin	United Kingdom		
Miller Hayes		1873	Verdier	France		
Mimie Mathy	Mimie Mathy	1999	Dorieux	France		
Minnehaha	Minnehaha	1905	Walsh	USA		
Minerve	Minerva	1868	Gonod	France		
Minette		1819	Vibert	France		
Minnie Pearl	Minnie Pearl	1982	Saville	USA		
Miranda		1869	De Sansal	France		
Miss Alice	Alice of Rothschild	2000	Austin	United Kingdom		
Miss Edith Cavell	Edith Cavell	1917	De Ruiter	Netherlands		
Miss Willmott	Ellen Willmott	1916	McGredy	Ireland		
Mistress Quickly	Mistress Quickly	1995	Austin	United Kingdom		
Mister Lincoln	Abraham Lincoln	1964	Swim/Weeks	USA		
Moje Hammarberg		1931	Hammarberg			
Monica Bellucci	Monica Bellucci	Between 1940 and 2010	Meilland	France		
Mortimer Sackler aka 'Mary Delaney'	Mortimer Sackler	2002	Austin	United Kingdom		
Monsieur Boncenne		1864	Liabaud	France		
Monsieur Cordier		1871	Gonod	France		
Monsieur de Morand		1891	Schwartz	France		
Monsieur Fillion		1876	Gonod	France		
Monsieur Jules Lemaître	Jules Lemaître	1890	Vigneron	France		
Monsieur Lapierre		1878	Gonod	France		
Monsieur le Capitaine Louis Frère	Louis Frère	1883	Vigneron	France		
Monsieur Rambaux	Joseph Rambaux	1872		France		
Monsieur Tillier		1801	Bernaix	France		
Montezuma	Moctezuma II	1955	Swim	USA		
Mountbatten	Louis Mountbatten	1982	Harkness	United Kingdom		
Moyes Rose	James Moyes	1894	Hemsley/Wilson	Canada		
Mozart	Wolfgang Amadeus Mozart	1937	Lambert	Germany		
Mrs. Aaron Ward	Mrs. Aaron Ward	1907	Pernet-Ducher	France		
Mrs. Aaron Ward	Mrs. Aaron Ward	1922	Dickson	United Kingdom		
Mrs Anthony Waterer		1898	Waterer	United Kingdom		
Mrs. B. R. Cant		1901	Cant	USA		
Mrs Baker		1876	Turner	United Kingdom		
Mrs Billie Crick		1995	Scarman	United Kingdom		
Mrs. Charles Bell		1917				
Mrs Colville			Colville	United Kingdom		
Mrs Doreen Pike		1989	Austin	United Kingdom		
Mrs. F. F. Prentiss		1925	Horvath			
Mrs F. W. Flight		1905	Cutbush	United Kingdom		
Mrs. Foley-Hobbs	Mrs. Foley-Hobbs					
Mrs. Franklin D. Roosevelt	Eleanor Roosevelt	1933	Traendly & Schenck	USA		
Mrs Fred Danks		1951	Clark	Australia		
Mrs. Harkness	Mary Anne Harkness	1893	Harkness	United Kingdom		
Mrs Herbert Stevens		1922	Pernet-Ducher	France		
Mrs. Iris Clow		1994	Harkness	United Kingdom		
Mrs John Laing		1887	Bennett	United Kingdom		
Mrs O. G. Orpen		Orpen	United Kingdom			
Mrs. Oakley Fisher		1921	Cant	USA		
Mrs Paul		1891	Paul	United Kingdom		
Mrs R.G. Sharman-Crawford		1894	Dickson	United Kingdom		
Mrs Sam McGredy	Ruth McGredy	1929	McGredy	Ireland		
Mrs Sam McGredy	Ruth McGredy	1937	Buisman	Netherlands		
Mrs Theodore Roosevelt	Edith Roosevelt	1902	Hill	USA		
Mrs W. J. Grant		1895	Dickson	United Kingdom		
Ms Amanda Coombes		2005	Newman	Australia		
Ms Rhonda Louise		2010	Newman	Australia		
Ms Wendy Poulier		2004	Newman	Australia		
Muriel	Muriel Maynard	1991	Harkness	United Kingdom		
Mutter Brada		1934	Brada	Czechoslovakia		

Top of page

== N ==
Name of variety	Namesake	Date	Rose breeder	Location	Image	Ref
Nancy Hayward		1937	Clark	Australia		
Nancy Reagan	Nancy Reagan	2005	Zary	USA		
Nancy Steen	Nancy Steen	1976	Sherwood	New Zealand		
Napoleon	Napoleon	1814	Pays-Bas			
Natalie Böttner		1909	Böttner	Germany		
Newton	Isaac Newton	1869	Gonod	France		
Niccolò Paganini	Niccolò Paganini	1991	Meilland	France		
Nicola Welter		1903	Jacobs	Germany		
Niles Cochet		1906	California Nursery Co.	USA		
Nina Weibull		1961	Poulsen	Denmark		
Niobe	Niobe	1895	Geschwind	Austria-Hungary		
Nozomi aka 'Heideröslein'	Nozomi Onodera	1968	T. Onodera	Japan		
Nymphe Egeria	Egeria	1891	Geschwind	Austria-Hungary		
Nymphe Teplá		1886	Geschwind	Austria-Hungary		

Top of page

== O ==
Name of variety	Namesake	Date	Rose breeder	Location	Image	Ref
Obergärtner Franz Jost		1902	Geschwind	Austria-Hungary		
Oberhofgärtner A. Singer		1904	Lambert	Germany		
Octavia Hill	Octavia Hill	1994	Harkness	United Kingdom		
Odette de Champdivers	Odette de Champdivers	Before 1848				
Ökonomierat Echtermayer		1913	Lambert	Germany		
Olive	Olive Harkness Scotchmer	1892	Harkness	United Kingdom		
Olivia Newton-John	Olivia Newton-John					
Olivier Delhomme		1861	V. Verdier	France		
Omar Khayyam	Omar Khayyam	1893	Kew Gardens	United Kingdom		
Ophelia	Ophelia	1912	W. Paul	France		
Ormiston Roy	W. Ormiston Roy	1953	Doorenbos	Canada		
Oscar Kordel		1897	Lambert	Germany		
Otto von Bismarck	Otto von Bismarck	1908	Kiese	Germany		
Otto von Weddingen		1904	Lambert	Germany		
Our Molly	Molly Frizzell	1994	Dickson	United Kingdom		
Ovid	Ovid	1890	Geschwind	Austria-Hungary		

Top of page

== P ==
Name of variety	Namesake	Date	Rose breeder	Location	Image	Ref
Paddy McGredy		1962	McGredy	United Kingdom		
Paganini	Niccolò Paganini	1989	Lens	Belgium		
Paola	Paola Del Medico	1981	Tantau	Germany		
Papageno		1989	McGredy			
Papa Gontier		1882	Nabonnand	France		
Papa Gouchault		1922	Turbat	France		
Papa Lambert		1899	Lambert	Germany		
Papa Meilland	Francis Meilland	1963	Meilland	France		
Papa Schneider		1961	Kriloff	France		
Papi Delbard		1995	Delbard	France		
Parmentier	Antoine-Augustin Parmentier	1847	Vibert or Robert	France		
Pat Austin		1995	Austin	United Kingdom		
Pat James		1991	Harkness	United Kingdom		
Paul Bocuse	Paul Bocuse	1997	Guillot-Massad	France		
Paul Cézanne	Paul Cézanne	1995	Delbard	France		
Paul Crampel	Paul Crampel	1930	Kluis & Konig/Kordes	Netherlands/Germany		
Paul Kadalozigue		1912	Lambert	Germany		
Paul Noël		1913	Tanne	France		
Paul Neyron		1869	Levet	France		
Paul Ricard	Paul Ricard	1991	Meilland	France		
Paul Ricault	Paul Rycaut	1845	Portemer	France		
Paul Shirville aka 'Heart Throb'		1983	Harkness	United Kingdom		
Paul Transon		1900	Barbier	France		
Paula Clegg		1912	Kiese	Germany		
Pearlie Mae	Pearl Bailey	1981	Buck	USA		
Peer Gynt	Peer Gynt	1968	Kordes	Germany		
Peggy Lee	Peggy Lee	1983	Armstrong	USA		
Pelé	Pelé	1979	Bernardella	USA		
Pélisson		1848	Vibert	France		
Penelope	Penelope	1924	Pemberton	United Kingdom		
Penelope Keith	Penelope Keith	1983	McGredy	New Zealand		
Percy Izzard	Percy Izzard	1936	H. Robinson			
Pergolèse	Giovanni Battista Pergolesi	1860	Moreau-Robert	France		
Pernille Poulsen		1965	Poulsen	Denmark		
Peter Beales	Peter Beales	2000	Clements	USA		
Peter Frankenfeld	Peter Frankenfeld	1966	Kordes	Germany		
Peter Lambert	Peter Lambert	1936	Vogel	Germany		
Peter Rosegger	Peter Rosegger	1914	Lambert	Germany		
Philipp Paulig		1908	Lambert	Germany		
Philippe Candeloro	Philippe Candeloro	2009	Guillot	France		
Philippe Noiret aka 'Glowing Peace'		1998	Meilland	France		
Philippine Lambert		1903	Lambert	Germany		
Phyllis Bide		1923	Bide	United Kingdom		
Picasso	Pablo Picasso	1966	McGredy	Ireland		
Pierre Gagnaire	Pierre Gagnaire	2003	Delbard	France		
Pierre-Auguste Renoir	Pierre-Auguste Renoir	1995	Meilland	France		
Pierre de Ronsard aka 'Eden'		1985	Meilland	France		
Pigalle	Jean-Baptiste Pigalle	1984	Meilland	France		
Pius IX	Pope Pius IX	1849	Vibert	France		
Plomin	Karl Plomin	1951	Tantau	Germany		
Pompadour	Madame de Pompadour	1979	Murray			
Pope Francis	Pope Francis	2015	Croix	France		
Pope John Paul II	Pope John Paul II	2006	Jackson & Perkins	USA		
Portland	Margaret Bentinck	1782	Brunton	United Kingdom		
Président Dutailly	Gustave Dutailly	1888	Dubreuil	France		
Président Gausen		1862	H & G Pradel	France		
President Herbert Hoover	Herbert Hoover	1930	Coddington	USA		
President Herbert Hoover	Herbert Hoover	1931	Cant	USA		
Président Lincoln	Abraham Lincoln	1863	Granger	France		
Président Schlachter		1872	Verdier	France		
Prince Camille de Rohan	Camille de Rohan	1861	Verdier	France		
Prince Caspian	Prince Caspian					
Prince Charles	Charles of Aremberg	1842	Hardy	Luxemburg		
Prince Charles d'Aremberg	Charles of Aremberg	1877	Soupert & Notting	Luxemburg		
Prince Eugène de Beauharnais	Eugène de Beauharnais	1864	Moreau-Robert	France		
Prince de Bulgarie	Ferdinand I	1900	Pernet-Ducher	France		
Prince Frédéric	Frédéric de Merode	1840	Parmentier	Belgium		
Prince Napoléon	Napoléon Joseph Charles Paul Bonaparte	1864	Pernet	France		
Princess Aiko	Aiko, Princess Toshi	2002	Keisei	Japan		
Princess Alexandra Renaissance	Alexandra, Countess of Frederiksborg	1998	Olesen	Denmark		
Princess Alice aka 'Zonta Rose' aka 'Bright Lights'	Princess Alice, Duchess of Gloucester	1985	Harkness	United Kingdom		
Princess Margaret	Princess Margaret, Countess of Snowdon	1969	Meilland	France		
Princess Mary of Cambridge	Princess Mary Adelaide of Cambridge	1867	Paul	United Kingdom		
Princess Michael of Kent	Princess Michael of Kent	1979	Harkness	United Kingdom		
Princesse de Monaco aka 'Grace Kelly'	Grace Kelly	1981	Meilland	France		
Princess Royal	Anne, Princess Royal	1992	Dickson	United Kingdom		
Princess Tomohito of Mikasa	Princess Tomohito of Mikasa	2003		United Kingdom		
Princess of Wales	Alexandra of Denmark	1871	Laxton	United Kingdom		
Princess of Wales	Diana, Princess of Wales	1997	Harkness	United Kingdom		
Princesse de Béarn		1885	Lévêque	France		
Princesse de Lamballe aka 'Souvenir de la Princesse de Lamballe'	Princess Marie Louise of Savoy	Before 1830	Miellez	France		
Princesse Louise	Marie-Louise of France	1828	Jacques	France		
Princesse Marie	Princess Marie of Orléans	1829	Jacques	France		
Princesse Marie-Adélaïde de Luxembourg	Marie-Adélaïde	1895	Soupert & Notting	Luxembourg		
Princesse Marie Dolgorouky		1878	Gonod	France		
Princesse de Vaudémont	Louise de Lorraine-Vaudémont	1854	Moreau/Robert	France		
Prinz Rupert	Prince Rupprecht	1910	Lambert	Germany		
Prinzessin Adolf zu Schaumburg-Lippe	Princess Viktoria	1913	Lambert	Germany		
Prinzessin Hildegard von Bayern	Princess Hildegard of Bavaria	1914	Lambert	Germany		
Prior M. Oberthau						
Professor Gnau	Ewald Gnau	1928	Tantau	Germany		
Professor Knöll	Hans Knöll	1964	W. Berger	East Germany		
Prolifera Redouté	Pierre-Joseph Redouté	1824		France		
Prospero	Prospero	1982	Austin	United Kingdom		
Psyche	Psyche	1899	Paul	United Kingdom		
Puccini	Giacomo Puccini	1984	Lens	Belgium		

Top of page

== Q ==
Name of variety	Namesake	Date	Rose breeder	Location	Image	Ref
Quadra	Juan Francisco de la Bodega y Quadra	1994		Canada		
Queen Alexandra	Alexandra of Denmark	1918	McGreedy	Ireland		
Queen Charlotte	Charlotte of Mecklenburg-Strelitz	1989	Harkness	United Kingdom		
Queen Elizabeth	Elizabeth II	1954	Crichet	USA		
Queen Elizabeth I	Elizabeth I	1800	Du Pont	France		
Queen Mother	Queen Elizabeth The Queen Mother	1990	Kordes	Germany		
Queen Nefertiti	Nefertiti	1988	Austin	United Kingdom		
Queen Sirikit	Queen Sirikit	1968	Andre Hendricx	France		
Queen of Sweden	Queen Christina	2004	Austin	United Kingdom		
Queen Victoria	Queen Victoria	1851	Fontaine/A. Paul	United Kingdom		

Top of page

== R ==
Name of variety	Namesake	Date	Rose breeder	Location	Image	Ref
Rabelais II	François Rabelais	1998	Meilland	France		
Rachel Crawshay	Rachel Crawshay	1977	Harkness	United Kingdom		
Raphael	Raphael	1856	Robert	France		
Ravel	Maurice Ravel	1988	Lens	Belgium		
Reba McEntire	Reba McEntire	1998	McGredy	New Zealand		
Rebecca Claire		1986	Law	United Kingdom		
Regierungsrat Rottenberger	Friedrich Leo von Rottenberger	1926	Praskac	Austria		
Régine Crespin	Régine Crespin	1990	Delbard	France		
Reichsgraf von Kesselstatt	Reichsgraf von Kesselstatt	1898	Lambert	Germany		
Reichspräsident von Hindenburg	Paul von Hindenburg	1933	Lambert	Germany		
Reine Olga de Württemberg	Olga Nikolaevna of Russia	1881	Nabonnand	France		
Reine Victoria	Queen Victoria	1872	Labruyère/Schwartz	France		
Rembrandt	Rembrandt	1883	Moreau-Robert	France		
Renata Tebaldi	Renata Tebaldi	1989	Delbard	France		
René André	René André	1901	Barbier	France		
René d'Anjou	René of Anjou	1853	Robert	France		
René Goscinny	René Goscinny	2005	Meilland	France		
Resi Bindseil		1913	Lambert	Germany		
Richard Elbel		1927	Elbel	Germany		
Richard Strauss	Richard Strauss	1989	Noack			
Richard Wagner	Richard Wagner	1893	Türke	Germany		
Rob Roy	Robert Roy MacGregor	1971	Cocker	United Kingdom		
Robert Bäßler		1905	Hinner	Germany		
Robert Betten		1920	J.C. Schmidt	Germany		
Robert Fortune	Robert Fortune	1853	Moreau-Robert	France		
Robin Hood	Robin Hood	1927	Pemberton	United Kingdom		
Rodin	Auguste Rodin	1990	Meilland	France		
Roger Lambelin	Roger Lambelin	1890	Schwartz	France		
Roman Herzog	Roman Herzog	1999	Noack	Germany		
Ronald Reagan	Ronald Reagan	2005	Zary	USA		
Roncall	Circus Roncalli	1997	Noack	Germany		
Roosevelt	Theodore Roosevelt	1922	Lambert	Germany		
Rose Benary		1908	Lambert	Germany		
Rosel Klemm		1904	Hinner	Germany		
Rosemarie Viaud		1924	Igoult	France		
Rosemary Foster		1997	Foster	United Kingdom		
Rosemary Harkness		1985	Harkness	United Kingdom		
Rosenpfarrer Meyer	Wilhelm Meyer	1930	Soupert	Luxembourg		
Rosenprofessor Sieber		1997	Kordes	Germany		
Rosi Mittermaier	Rosi Mittermaier	1977	Kordes	Germany		
Rosie O'Donnell	Rosie O'Donnell	1998	Winchell	USA		
Rosiériste Chauvry	Jean-Baptiste Chauvry	1885	Gonod	France		
Rosomane Gravereaux	Jules Gravereaux	1899	Soupert & Notting	Luxembourg		
Roy Black aka 'Karen Blixen' aka 'Isis'		1993	Olesen	Denmark		
Royal Edward	Edward VII	1995		Canada		
Royal William		1984	Kordes	Germany		
Rubens	Peter Paul Rubens	1859	Moreau-Robert	France		
Rübezahl	Rübezahl	1917	Krüger	Germany		
Rückert	Friedrich Rückert	1914	Lambert	Germany		
Rudolf von Bennigsen		1932	Lambert	Germany		
Ruskin	John Ruskin	1892	Van Fleet	USA		

Top of page

== S ==
Name of variety	Namesake	Date	Rose breeder	Location	Image	Ref
Saint-Exupéry	Antoine de Saint-Exupéry	1961	Delbard	France		
Sally Holmes	Sally Holmes	1976	Holmes	United Kingdom		
Sally's Rose	Sally Pawsey	1994	Cant	United Kingdom		
Samuel Pepys	Samuel Pepys	1934	Cant	United Kingdom		
Sankta Rita	Rita of Cascia	1922	Alfons	Germany		
Santa Tereza d'Avila	Teresa of Ávila	1959	Moreira da Silva	Portugal		
Santana	Telê Santana	1985	Tantau	Germany		
Sappho	Sappho	Before 1817		France		
Sarah		1986	Meilland	France		
Sarah van Fleet		1926	Van Fleet	USA		
Scarlet Queen Elizabeth	Elizabeth II	1963	Dickson	United Kingdom		
Schiller	Friedrich Schiller	1913	Lambert	Germany		
Schneewittchen	Snow White	1901	Lambert	Germany		
Schön Ingeborg	Schön Ingeborg	1921	Kiese	Germany		
Sebastian Kneipp	Sebastian Kneipp	1997	Kordes	Germany		
Sénateur Amic	Jean Amic	1924	Nabonnand	France		
Senator Burda	Franz Burda	1988	Meilland	France		
Serafina Longa		1933	Fojo	Spain		
Sharifa Asma	Sharifa Asma	1989	Austin	United Kingdom		
Sheila MacQueen		1994	Harkness	United Kingdom		
Sibelius	Jean Sibelius	1984	Lens	Belgium		
Signe Relander	Signe Relander	1928	Poulsen	Denmark		
Signora Piero Puricelli		1935	Aicardi	Italy		
Simon Bolivar	Simon Bolivar	1966	Armstrong	USA		
Simon Fraser	Simon Fraser	1992		Canada		
Simone de Nanteuil		1925	Schwartz	France		
Sir Cedric Morris	Cedric Morris	1979	Morris/Beales	United Kingdom		
Sir Clough	Clough Williams-Ellis	1985	Harkness	United Kingdom		
Sir Edward Elgar	Edward Elgar	1982	Harkness	United Kingdom		
Sir Frederick Ashton	Frederick Ashton	1985	Beales	United Kingdom		
Sir Walter Raleigh	Walter Raleigh	1985	Harkness	United Kingdom		
Sir Winston Churchill	Winston Churchill	1955	Dickson	United Kingdom		
Sissel Kyrkjebø	Sissel Kyrkjebø	1969	Bergen	Norway		
Sonia Meilland	Sonia Meilland	1974	Meilland	France		
Sonia Rykiel	Sonia Rykiel	1995	Guillot-Massad	France		
Sonja Meilove		2000	Meilland	France		
Sophie de Marsilly	Sophie de Marsilly	1863	Moreau-Robert	France		
Soupert et Notting	Jean Soupert and Pierre Notting	1867	Pernet-Ducher	France		
Souvenir d'Adolphe de Charvoik		1911		France		
Souvenir d'Alphonse Lavallée	Alphonse Lavallée	1884	Verdier	France		
Souvenir du Baron de Rothschild		1869	Avoux/Crozy	France		
Souvenir de Christophe Cochet	Christophe Cochet	1894	Cochet	France		
Souvenir de Claudius Pernet	Joseph Pernet-Ducher	1920	Pernet-Ducher	France		
Souvenir du Docteur Jamain		1865	Lacharme	France		
Souvenir de Georges Pernet	Joseph Pernet-Ducher	1927	Pernet-Ducher	France		
Souvenir de Henry Clay	Henry Clay	1855	Portemer Père	France		
Souvenir de Jeanne Balandreau	Jeanne Balandreau	1899	Robichon	France		
Souvenir de Julie Gonod		1871	Gonod	France		
Souvenir de la Reine d'Angleterre	Queen Victoria	1855	Cochet	France		
Souvenir de Labruyère	Eugène Labruyère	1885	Gonod	France		
Souvenir de Léon Gambetta	Léon Gambetta	1883	Gonod	France		
Souvenir de Louis Amade	Louis Amade	2000	Delbard	France		
Souvenir de Madame Auguste Charles		1866	Moreau-Robert	France		
Souvenir de Madame Boullet		1921	Pernet-Ducher	France		
Souvenir de Madame Bruel		1889	Levet	France		
Souvenir de Madame de Corval		1867	Gonod	France		
Souvenir de Madame Hélène Lambert	Hélène Lambert	1885	Gonod	France		
Souvenir de Madame H. Thuret		1922	Texier	France		
Souvenir de Madame Robert		1879	Moreau-Robert	France		
Souvenir de Marcel Proust	Marcel Proust	1993	Delbard	France		
Souvenir de Philémon Cochet	Philémon Cochet	1899	Cochet	France		
Souvenir de Pierre Notting	Pierre Notting	1902	Soupert/Notting	Luxembourg		
Souvenir de Pierre Vibert	Jean-Pierre Vibert	1867	Moreau-Robert	France		
Souvenir de St. Anne's	Saint Anne	Before 1919	Campbell	Ireland		
Souvenir du Président Carnot	Marie François Sadi Carnot	1894	Pernet-Ducher	France		
Souvenir du Président Lincoln	Abraham Lincoln	1865	Moreau-Robert	France		
Souvenir du Rosiériste Gonod	Jean-Marie Gonod	1889	Ducher	France		
Souvenir de Victor Hugo	Victor Hugo	1885	Pernet	France		
St. Boniface	Saint Boniface	1980	Kordes	Germany		
St. Bruno	Bruno of Cologne	1985	Hallows/Sealand	United Kingdom		
St. Cecilia	Saint Cecilia	1987	Harkness	United Kingdom		
St. Christopher	Saint Christopher	1996	Harkness	United Kingdom		
St. John	John the Apostle	1994	Harkness	United Kingdom		
St. Lucia	Saint Lucy	1973	Tantau	Germany		
St. Nicholas	Saint Nicholas	1950	Hilling	United Kingdom		
St. Patrick	Saint Patrick	1991	Strickland	USA		
St. Swithun	Swithun	1993	Harkness	United Kingdom		
Staatspräsident Päts	Konstantin Päts	1937	Weigand	Germany		
Stadkassierer Wilhelm Liffa		1889	Geschwind	Austria-Hungary		
Stadtrat F. Kähler		1905	Geduldig	Austria-Hungary		
Steffi Graf	Steffi Graf	1993	Hetzel	Germany		
Stéphanie Charreton		1886	Gonod	France		
Studienrat Schlenz		1926	Lambert	Germany		
Sue Hipkin aka 'Chimène' aka 'Lady Jane Grey'		1997	Harkness	United Kingdom		
Sue Ryder	Sue Ryder	1983	Harkness	United Kingdom		
Susan Hampshire	Susan Hampshire	1974	Paolino/Meilland	France		
Svaty Václav	Wencelaus I	1936	Berger	Czechoslovakia		
Sylvie Vartan	Sylvie Vartan					

Top of page

== T ==
Name of variety	Namesake	Date	Rose breeder	Location	Image	Ref
Tabitha		2014	Bannister	United Kingdom		
Taglioni	Marie Taglioni	1833 or earlier				
Tania Verstak	Tania Verstak	1962	Armbrust	Australia		
Tchaikovski	Pyotr Ilyich Tchaikovsky	1999	Meilland	France		
Teresa Scarman		1996	Ferguson/Scarman	United Kingdom		
Tess of the d'Ubervilles	Tess Durbeyfield	1998	Austin	United Kingdom		
Thalia	Thalia	1895	Schmitt/Lambert	Germany		
Thalia Remontant	Thalia Remontant	1903	Lambert	Germany		
Thalie La Gentille		cca. 1800	Descemet	France		
The Queen Alexandra Rose	Alexandra of Denmark	1918	McGredy	Ireland		
Thelma Barlow	Thelma Barlow	2001	Fryers	United Kingdom		
Thérèse Bugnet	Thérèse Bugnet	1950	Bugnet	Canada		
Therese Zeimet-Lambert		1923	Lambert	Germany		
Thisbe	Thisbe	1918	Pemberton	United Kingdom		
Thomas Barton		1988	Meilland	France		
Thor	Thor	1940	Horvath	USA		
Tiergartendirektor Timm		1944	Kordes	Germany		
Till Uhlenspiegel	Till Eulenspiegel	1950	Kordes	Germany		
Tinkerbell	Tinkerbell	1992	Schuurman	New Zealand		
Tino Rossi	Tino Rossi	1990	Meilland	France		
Titian	Titian	1950	Riethmüller	Australia		
Tom Brown	Tom Brown	1964	LeGrice	United Kingdom		
Tom Wood		1896	Dickson	United Kingdom		
Toulouse-Lautrec	Henri de Toulouse-Lautrec	1993	Meilland	France		
Tracey Wickham	Tracey Wickham	1984	Welsh	Australia		
Trevor Griffiths	Trevor Griffiths	1994	Austin	United Kingdom		
Troilus	Troilus	1983	Austin	United Kingdom		
Turenne	Henri de la Tour d'Auvergne	1846	Vibert	France		

Top of page

== U ==
Name of variety	Namesake	Date	Rose breeder	Location	Image	Ref
Uhland	Ludwig Uhland	1917	Lambert			
Ulrich Brunner Fils	Ulrich Brunner fils	1882	Levet	France		
Uncle Walter	Walter Cronkite	1963	McGredy	Ireland		
Undine	Ondine	1901	Jacobs	Germany		
Urdh	Urðr	1933	Tantau	Germany		
Uwe Seeler	Uwe Seeler	1970	Kordes	Germany		

Top of page

== V ==
Name of variety	Namesake	Date	Rose breeder	Location	Image	Ref
Van Artevelde	Jacob van Artevelde	1847	Parmentier	France		
Van Gogh	Vincent van Gogh	1996	Williams	USA		
Van Huysum	Jan van Huysum	1845	Parmentier	France		
Venus	Venus	Before 1817		France		
Venus	Venus	1904	Welter	Germany		
Verdi	Giuseppe Verdi	1960	Dorieux	France		
Verdi	Giuseppe Verdi	1982	Lens	Belgium		
Vick's Caprice	James Vick	1891	Vick	USA		
Vicomte Douglas		1871	Gonod	France		
Vicomtesse de Bernis	Jeanne-Marie Arthaud von Laferrière	1884	Nabonnand	France		
Vicomtesse Decazes	Diane de Brancalis de Maurel d'Aragon	1844	Pradel	France		
Vicomtesse Douglas		1862	Gonod	France		
Victor Parmentier		1847	Parmentier	France		
Vincente Peluffo		1902	Lévêque	France		
Violet Carson	Violet Carson	1964	McGredy	Ireland		
Violette Bouyer	Violette Bouyer-Karr	1881	Lacharme	France		
Virginia R. Coxe		1897	Geschwind	Austria-Hungary		
Viscountess Folkestone	Helen Radnor	1886	Bennett	United Kingdom		
Von Hardenberg	Novalis	1915	Lambert	Germany		
Von Scharnhorst	Gerhard von Scharnhorst	1921	Lambert	Germany		

Top of page

== W ==
Name of variety	Namesake	Date	Rose breeder	Location	Image	Ref
Weisse Max Graf	Max Graf	1983	Kordes	Germany		
Wendy Cussons		1963	Gregory	United Kingdom		
Wenzel Geschwind	Wenzel Geschwind	1902	Geschwind	Austria-Hungary		
Werner von Blon	Werner von Blon	1993	Hetzel	Germany		
White Cécile Brunner	Cécile Brunner	1909	Fauqué	France		
Wieland	Christoph Martin Wieland	1916	Lambert	Germany		
Wilhelm Frank	Wilhelm Frank	1910	Welter	Germany		
Wilhelm Hansmann	Wilhelm Hansmann	1955	Kordes	Germany		
Wilhelm Kordes	Wilhelm Kordes	1922	Kordes	Germany		
Will Alderman	Will Alderman	1949	Skinner			
Will Scarlet	Will Scarlet	1947	Hilling	United Kingdom		
Willi Maass	Willi Maass	1942	Krause	Germany		
William III	William III					
William Allen Richardson		1878	Pernet-Ducher	France		
William and Mary	William III and Mary II	1988	Beales	United Kingdom		
William Baffin	William Baffin	1983	Svejda	Canada		
William Booth	William Booth	1999	Ogilvie/Svejda	Canada		
William Christie	William Christie	1999	Guillot	France		
William Francis Bennett	William Francis Bennett	1884	Bennett	United Kingdom		
William Grant		1915	Schoener	Germany		
William Jesse		1838	Laffay	France		
William Lobb aka 'Duchesse d'Istrie'	William Lobb	1855	Laffay	France		
William Morris	William Morris	1998	Austin	United Kingdom		
William Shakespeare	William Shakespeare	1987	Austin	United Kingdom		
William Shakespeare 2000	William Shakespeare	2000	Austin	United Kingdom		
Wilona			Sievers	Germany		
Wimi	Willy Millowitsch	1983	Tantau	Germany		
Wise Portia	Portia	1983	Austin	United Kingdom		

Top of page

== X ==
Name of variety	Namesake	Date	Rose breeder	Location	Image	Ref
Xu Gui Hua		2004	Newman	Australia		

Top of page

== Y ==
Name of variety	Namesake	Date	Rose breeder	Location	Image	Ref
Yolande d'Aragon	Yolande d'Aragon	1843	Vibert	France		
Youki San		1965	Meilland	France		
Ypsilanti		1821	Vibert	France		
Yves Piaget	Yves Piaget	1984	Meilland	France		
Yvette Scarman			1995			
Yvonna		1995	Sievers	Germany		
Yvonne Rabier		1910	Turbat	France		

Top of page

== Z ==
Name of variety	Namesake	Date	Rose breeder	Location	Image	Ref
Zara Hore-Ruthven	Zara Hore-Ruthven	1932	Clark	Australia		
Zenobia	Zenobia	1892	Paul	United Kingdom		
Zéphirine Drouhin	Zéphirine Drouhin	1868	Bizot	France		
Zhong Lei		2010	Chengdu	China		
Zoé		1830	Vibert	France		
Zorina	Vera Zorina	1963	Boerner	USA		
Zuo Shuang		1999	Newman	Australia		

Top of page

== See also ==
- Lists of cultivars
- Rose
- List of Rosa species
- Garden roses
- Rose garden
- Rose trial grounds
- Rose show
