= Rich Valley, Alberta =

Rich Valley
- Hamlet
- Location of Rich Valley Rich Valley (Canada)
- Coordinates: 53°50′54″N 114°21′00″W
- Country: Canada
- Province: Alberta
- Region: Central Alberta
- Census division: 13
- Municipal district: Lac Ste. Anne County

Government
  - Type: Unincorporated
  - Governing body: Lac Ste. Anne County Council

Population (2008)
  - Total: 32
- Time zone: UTC−06:00 (Alberta Time)
- Area codes: 780, 587, 825

Rich Valley is a hamlet in central Alberta, Canada within Lac Ste. Anne County. It is located on Highway 33, approximately 70 kilometres (43 mi) northwest of Edmonton.

== History ==
Rich Valley was originally called "Onion Prairie". The first post office was established in the home of the Carlin family in 1909.

== Demographics ==
The population of Rich Valley, according to the 2008 municipal census conducted by Lac Ste. Anne County, is 32.

== Infrastructure ==
- Rich Valley Public Library
- Rich Valley School - Northern Gateway Public Schools (K-7)
- Rich Valley Community Church

== Notable people ==
- Georges Charles-Jules Bugnet, Canadian writer and horticulturalist, did much of his plant hybridization work at Rich Valley
- William Purdy, former MLA of Stoney Plain (1971–1986) and first mayor of the Village of Wabuman

== See also ==
- List of communities in Alberta
- List of hamlets in Alberta
