= Pierre Notting =

Luxembourgish gardener (1825–1895)

Pierre Notting (1825 – 1895) was a Luxembourgish rosarian known for his breeding of rose cultivars.

In 1855, in association with his friend Jean Soupert, he established the "Soupert & Notting" company specializing in growing roses in Limpertsberg. During the next years, and as from 1861, "Soupert & Notting" obtained medals at international competitions in France, Belgium, Germany, the Netherlands, the United Kingdom and the United States of America.

In 1874, Jean Pernet, père from Lyon dedicated them a moss rose: "Soupert & Notting".

Pierre Noting died in Luxembourg in 1895. His death was commemorated with an apricot-colored tea rose, called “Souvenir de Pierre Notting”, which in 1899 obtained a great gold medal in Ixelles, followed in 1903 by first prizes in Maastricht and Douai.
