= Georges Bugnet =

Georges Charles-Jules Bugnet (1879 - 1981) was a French Canadian writer and plant hybridiser. He wrote poetry, stories, articles, plays and four novels, the most well known of which is La Forêt (English: The Forest), published in 1935. His first two novels, Les Lys de sang (1922) and Nipsya (1924), were published under the pseudonym Henri Doutremont. He introduced the rose cultivar 'Thérèse Bugnet', named after his sister.

In 1978, he received an honorary degree from the University of Alberta.

== Early life ==
Bugnet was born in Chalon-sur-Saône, Burgundy, France on 23 February 1879. He initially studied toward a Christian priesthood, but left to attend the nearby Université du Dijon and then the Sorbonne in Paris. He worked as a journalist for the monthly publication La Croix, and was briefly named editor-in-chief of La Croix de Haute-Savoie, but then moved to Canada in 1904 with his new wife Julia, initially working in Manitoba, then moving to Alberta in 1905. Georges and Julia had nine children, though the second child, Paul, died in infancy in a fire.

== Literary career ==
Bugnet wrote novels, poetry, stories, essays, articles, diaries and plays. He had four novels published: Le Lys de sang (1923), Nipsya (1924), Siraf (1934) and La Forêt (1935). The first two were published under the nom de plume Henri Doutremont. His first poetry collection, Voix de la solitude, was published in 1938. Poèmes was published in 1978. He had articles, poems and short stories published in both French and English in several periodicals, including Le Canada Français and Les Idées. He was editor of l'Union, the provincial French language paper, between 1924 and 1929.

== Botanical interests ==
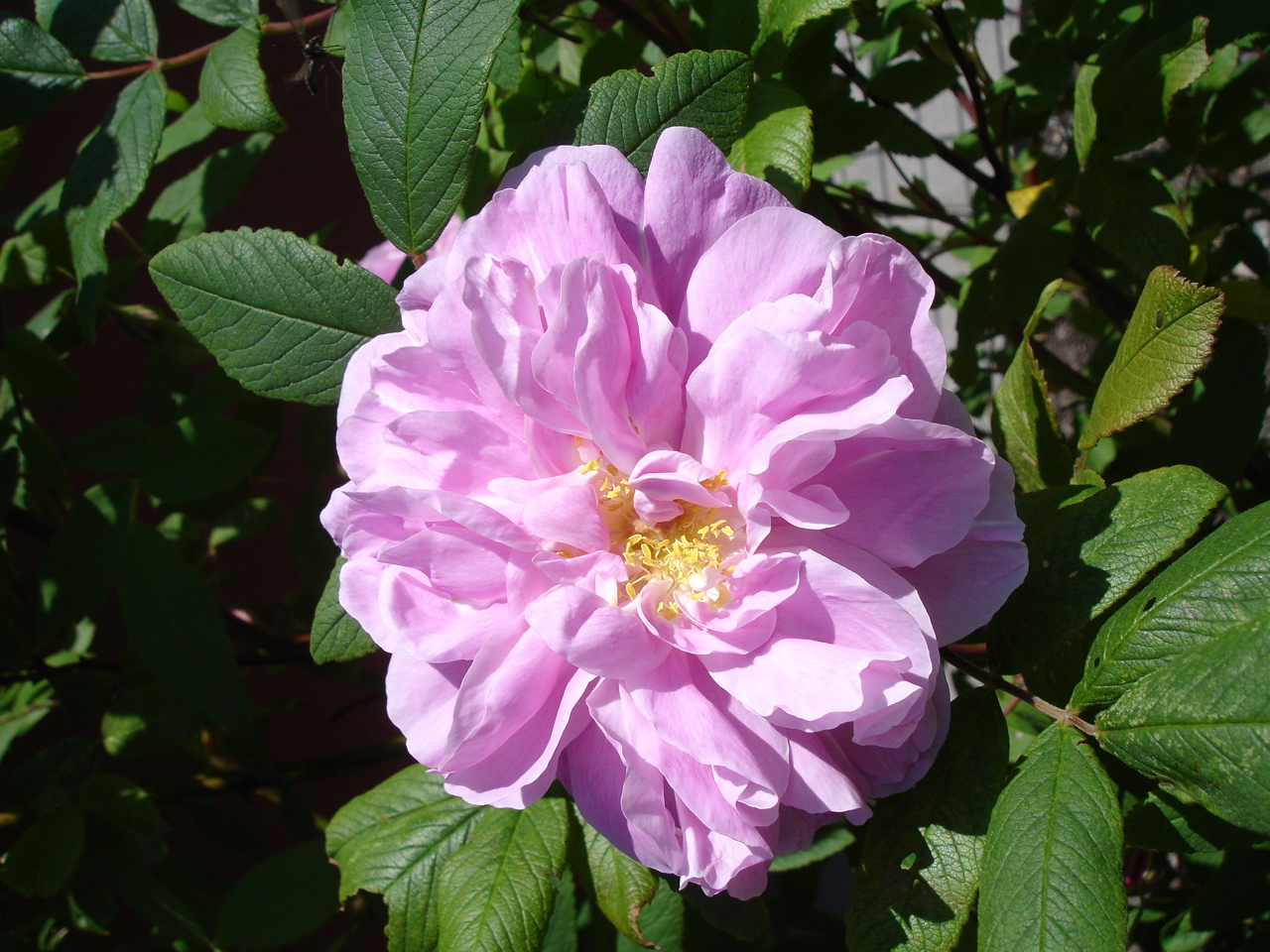
Rose cultivar 'Thérèse Bugnet', a hardy, scented, rose with few prickles, developed by Georges Bugnet

Bugnet was a self-taught botanist interested in finding useful trees and shrubs which could survive the harsh Canadian winters and provide income to farmers. He catalogued the local flora and corresponded with professional botanists about them. Bugnet homesteaded near Rich Valley, Alberta. His farm is now the Bugnet Plantation. He spent 25 years breeding roses; his 1950 introduction 'Thérèse Bugnet', an unusual hybrid involving three species, is still in commerce today. He also developed an apple which he called 'Paul Bugnet' and a plum called 'Claude Bugnet'. A forest reserve in Alberta is named after him, in honor of his silvicultural work.

== Death and legacy ==
Bugnet died on 11 January 1981 in a nursing home in St. Albert, Alberta. He is remembered in the Georges Bugnet Award for Novel, which was set up in the following year.
