= Victor Verdier =

French horticulturalist, florist and nurseryman

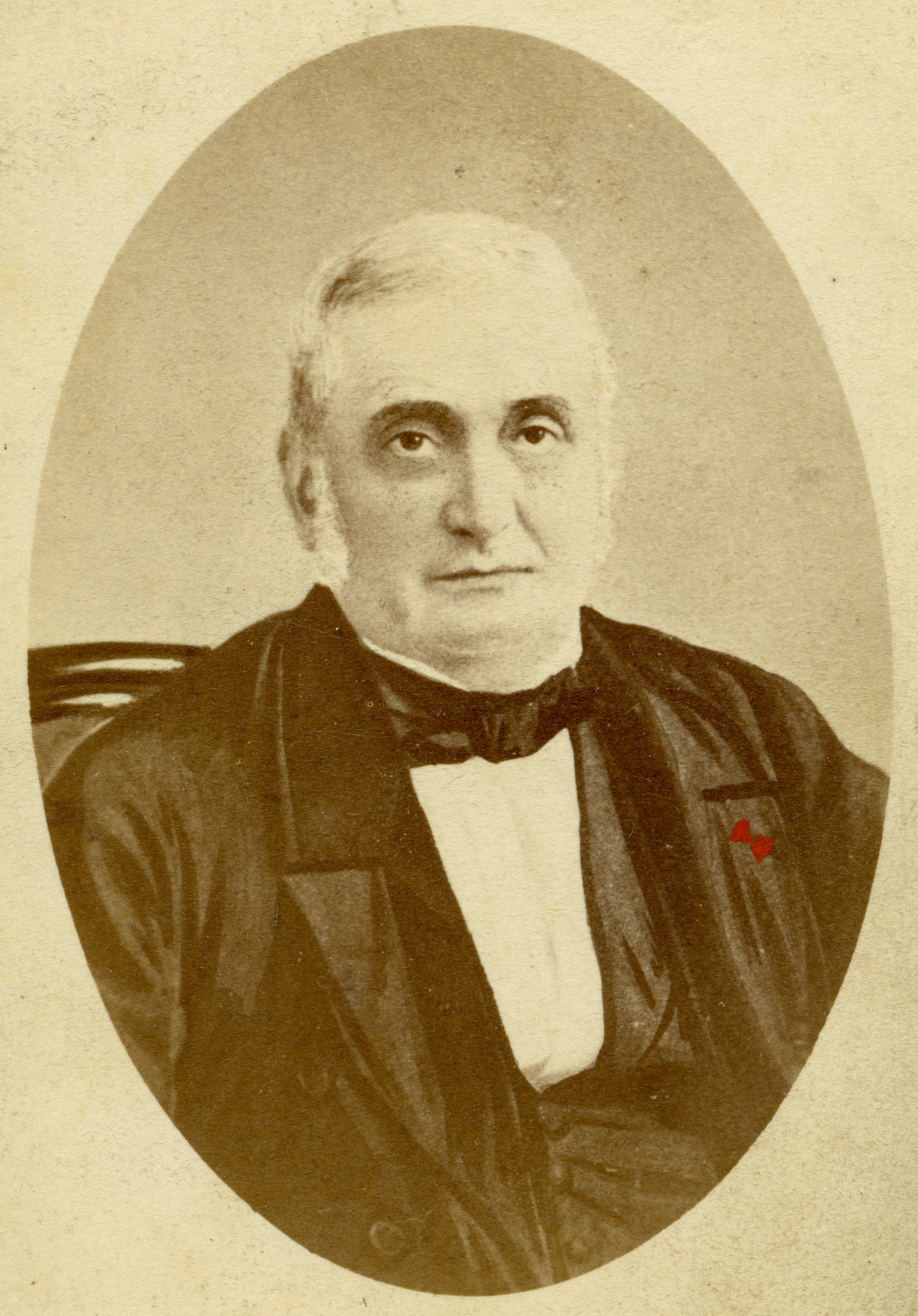

Philippe Victor Verdier (5 August 1803 – 3 February 1878) was a French horticulturist and breeder of hybrid roses. Two of his sons also continued to work in horticulture and rose breeding.

Verdier was born in Yerres, the son of Jean Augustin and Marie Elisabeth née Bahou. He was the nephew of Henri Antoine Jacques (1782-1866) who was the royal gardener and with him he collaborated on breeding hybrid Rosa sempervirens. In the 1820s he became gardener at Neuilly for the Duke of Orléans. In 1832 he became a member of the Société d'horticulture de Paris and in 1841 he was one of the founders of the Cercle Général d’horticulture. He served as a jury for numerous horticultural exhibitions. He was appointed as a knight of the legion of honour in 1865. He married Madeleine Rosalie Joséphine, daughter of the gardener Blaise Joseph Leroy, in 1824 and they had several children including Charles Félix Verdier and Louis Eugène Jules Verdier who followed their father in the horticulture career.
