= Jean-Marie Gonod =

French rosarian (1827–1888)

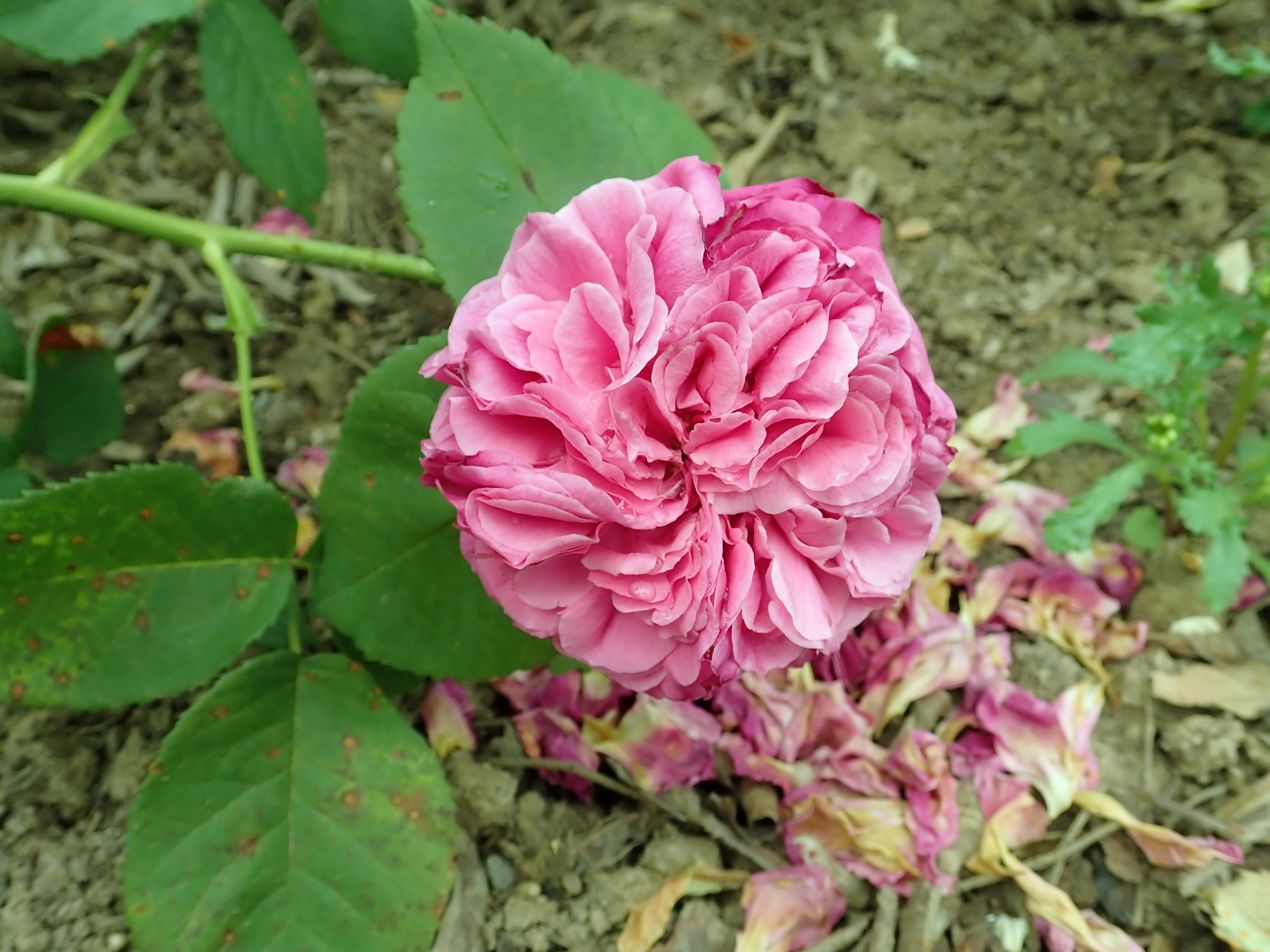
'Souvenir de Madame de Corval' (1867) in Sangerhausen.

Jean-Marie Gonod (1827–1888) was a French rosarian.

== Biography ==
Jean-Marie Gonod was born on 6 January 1827 in Crottet, Ain department, France. He started working in 1843 as a gardener apprentice at the château of Beauregard, Ain, In 1846 he moved to Lyon to complete his skills at the gardens of M. Crozy.

In 1848 he was appointed chief-gardener at the château de l’Aumus near Mâcon and in 1853 he worked in the same position at the château de Saint-Clément-les-Mâcon.

In 1857 he started working for the Parc de la Tête d’Or in Lyon, under the leadership of Dominique Collet. Here he started working as a rosarian, producing his first cultivars in 1863.

Jean-Marie Gonod died in Monplaisir-Lyon on 12 March 1888.

== Bibliography ==
- Nécrologie et variétés de Jean-Marie Gonod - Journal des Roses, avril 1888.
