= Rosa 'Glowing Peace' =

Grandiflora rose cultivar

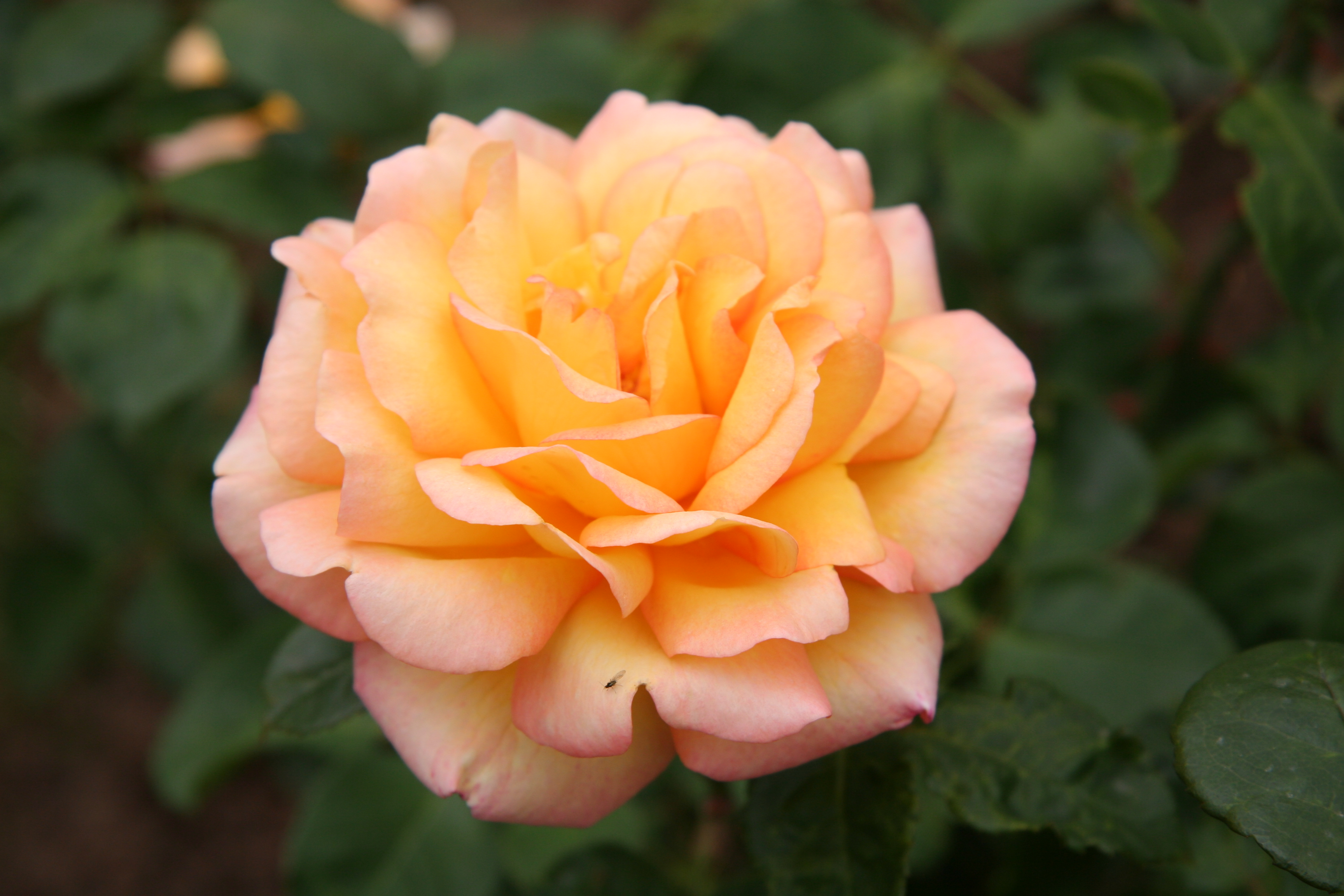
- Rosa 'Glowing Peace'
- Genus: Rosa hybrid
- Hybrid parentage: 'Sun King 74' x 'Roxane'
- Cultivar group: Grandiflora
- Cultivar: MEIzoele
- Marketing names: 'Phillipe Noiret' 'Glowing Peace'
- Breeder: Meilland
- Origin: France, 1999

Rosa 'Glowing Peace', (a.k.a. MEIzoele), is an orange and yellow Grandiflora rose cultivar, developed by Michèle Meilland Richardier before 1998. The cultivar was introduced into France as 'Phillipe Noiret', and into the United States by Star Roses and Plants as 'Glowing Peace'. The rose was named an All-America Rose Selections winner in 2001.

== Description ==
'Glowing Peace' is a medium, bushy shrub, 3 to 4 ft (90–151 cm) in height with a 2 to 3 ft (60–90 cm) spread. Blooms are 3–4 in (7.5–10 cm) in diameter, with a cupped bloom form. Flowers are orange and yellow with dark pink edges, and resemble the 'Peace rose', but are more striking in color, with non-fading pink edges. The flowers open from attractive, rounded buds which are dark red and yellow on the outside. Flowers are borne singly, and in small clusters up to five, on long, sturdy stems. The rose has a light, sweet tea fragrance and large, dark green foliage. 'Glowing Peace' is a vigorous grower, and blooms continuously from spring through fall. The plants do well in USDA zone 7 and warmer.

'Glowing Peace' was used by Allain Meilland, in France, to hybridize, the hybrid tea Rosa, 'Apricot Candy', (2006). The cultivar's stock parents are ('Just Joey' x 'Midas Touch') x ('Alphonse Daudet' x 'Glowing Peace'). The rose is a taller shrub than 'Glowing Peace' and its flowers are an apricot-pink blend.

== Awards ==
- All-America Rose Selections (AARS) winner, USA, (2001)

== See also ==
- Garden roses
- Rose Hall of Fame
- List of Award of Garden Merit roses
