= Jean Soupert =

Jean Soupert (1834–1910) was a Luxembourg-born floriculturist, who specialized in breeding rose cultivars.

== Biography ==
In 1855, with a friend, Pierre Notting, he established the "Soupert & Notting" company specializing in growing roses in Limpertsberg. In 1857, Soupert married Anne Marie Notting, Pierre Notting’s sister. During the next years, and as from 1861, “Soupert & Notting” obtained medals at international competitions in France, Belgium, Germany, the Netherlands, the United Kingdom and the United States of America.

In 1874, Jean Pernet, père from Lyon dedicated them a moss rose: “Soupert & Notting”. Jean Soupert died in Luxembourg in 1910.

== Legacy ==
After his death, his three sons, Jean-Pierre, Pierre-Alphonse and Jean-Constant Soupert took over the rosarium.

== Dinstinctions ==
- Luxembourg: Knight of the Order of the Oak Crown
- Belgium: Knight of the Order of Leopold
- France: Chevalier of the Legion of Honour
