= Dan Poncet =

French painter

Dan Poncet is a contemporary French painter.

Born on 14 July 1953 at the château de Saint-Just in Ain department, France. She graduated in 1972 from the École nationale supérieure d'architecture de Lyon and thereafter from the École nationale des beaux-arts de Lyon.

Her first paintings show an influence of impressionism and of fauvism. After 1975 she returned to realism and to old techniques used in 17th-century paintings, such as glaze, pâtes or demi-pâtes.

After meeting rosarian Jean Pierre Guillot in 1997, she also produced a series of paintings with subjects related to roses such as "Cueillette dans le Jardin de Roses". Guillot named a rose cultivar "Dan Poncet".
