= Eugenio Fojo =

Spanish rose breeder

Eugenio Fojo y Márquez (born 1889; died 1960) was a Spanish rose breeder who founded "La Florida" in northern Spain and the Basque Country. It was the most influential plant nursery and garden design firm in the 1930s. His rose, 'Irene Churruca,' is still sold as one of the classic roses of that era.

== Biography ==
Fojo was born in Cuba in 1899 while his father was in the Spanish colonial army there. However, he grew up in the Basque country of northern Spain. When he was 25, Fojo became an apprentice in Catalonia under Simon Dot and his son Pedro Dot, the famous rose breeder. Pedro eventually named a rose after Eugenio. Fojo studied in England, Italy, the United States, Switzerland and Germany before returning to set up a business in Bilbao, Spain. Probably using capital provided by aristocratic and well-heeled patrons, Fojo started "La Florida", a plant nursery, landscape design firm, and rose hybridizing enterprise which became very successful.

Fojo himself took a modest view of his rose breeding:

I have done no more, if I may say so, than bits and pieces. I'm not a hybridiser of the highest class, but I am proud to place my creations alongside those of my friends, who are among the highest achievers.

== Roses ==
Friera's Rosas de España lists Fojo roses in the order they were introduced: "His first rose was created in 1932 and was of course named 'La Florida' after his nursery. It was of a distinct salmon colour and earned him a diploma of merit in Barcelona’s rose competition held in Pedralbes. Following this, in 1933, he named 'Villa de Bilbao' after his beloved city. In the same year, he created 'Serafina Longa' and in 1934, produced 'Irene Churruca', which, with great triumph, won the Floral Gold Medal, also in Barcelona. In 1935, he created 'Señora de León Aujuria', not a rose anyone cares for. 'Monte Igueldo' came out in 1944, 'Condesa de Benahavis' in 1949, which was very pleasing and is considered a perfect rose. It had an attractive shade of salmon pink, excellent perfume, and displayed continuous flowering. After this came 'Gloria de Grado' (1950), and finally one called 'Marquesa de Narros'." 'Marquesa de Narros' is sometimes wrongly masculinised as 'Marques de Narros'.

La Florida also issued 'Embajador Lequerica' — "flowers strawberry-pink, reverse Indian yellow at base passing to brick-red at edge" – in 1962.

Of these roses, 'Irene Churruca' (usually listed in Anglophone sources as 'Golden Melody') remains the one most admired and most widely grown. It is on the list of the Californian nursery Vintage Gardens as:

"Large petals of pale creamy buff shade to golden apricot at the heart. A flower of immense beauty and complex fragrance. A great, lost classic …"

'Irene Churruca' is in the Carla Fineschi Foundation Rose Garden in Italy; the Europarosarium Sangerhausen in north Germany; at Mottisfont Abbey in England; in the Australian National Collection at Renmark and many others.

=== Sortable list of Fojo roses ===
This list of the known roses has been compiled from Friera, Rosas de España and the online Help Me Find Roses entry for Fojo, Eugenio. The online list in Spanish of the Amics de les Roses de Saint Feliu de Llobregat has also been consulted. The rose 'Eugenio Fojo' is added for completeness though of course it was raised by Pedro Dot, not Fojo himself.

Name	Date	Type	Colour	Extant
La Florida	1932	Hybrid tea	Salmon-orange	Yes
Villa de Bilbao	1933	Hybrid tea	Cardinal red	Unknown
Serafina Longa	1934	Hybrid tea	Old-rose pink	Yes
Irene Churruca	1934	Hybrid tea	Buff turning cream	Yes
Señora de León Aujuria	1935	Hybrid tea	Orange	Unknown
Monte Igueldo	1944	Hybrid tea	Velvety cardinal red	Yes
Condesa de Benahavis	1949	Hybrid tea	Salmon-pink	Yes
Gloria de Grado	1950	Hybrid tea	Pink tinted carmine	Unknown
Marquesa de Narros	1951	Hybrid tea	Salmon pink	Yes
Eugenio Fojo	1953	Pernetiana	Vermilion	Yes
Embajador Lequerica	1962	Pernetiana	Strawberry-pink, yellow reverses	Yes
