= Rosa 'Spice Twice' =

Rose cultivar

Rosa 'Spice Twice' is an orange hybrid tea rose. It was originally bred by Keith Zary in 1997.
