= Rosa 'Precious Platinum' =

Rose cultivar

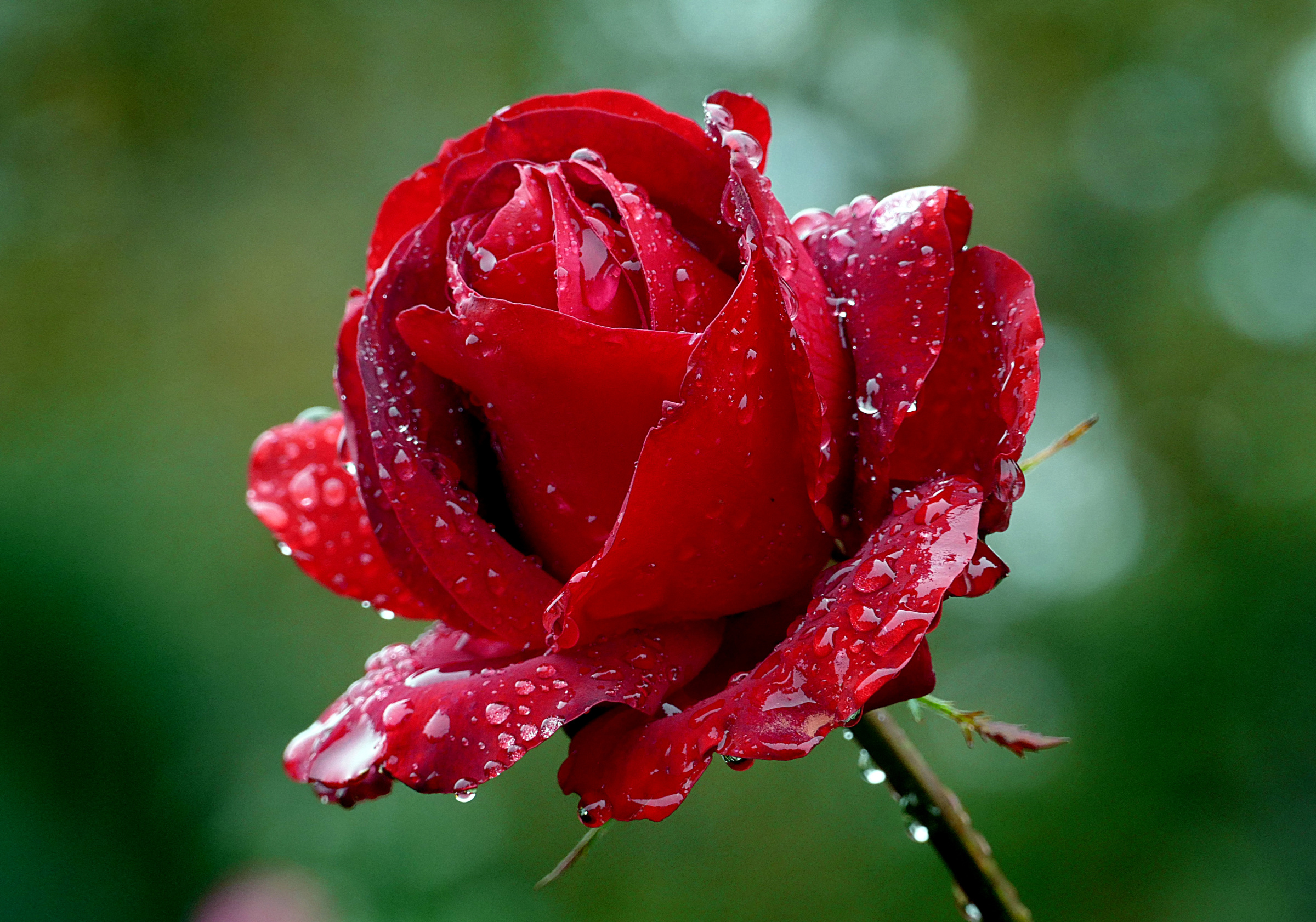
- Rosa 'Precious Platinum'
- Genus: Rosa
- Hybrid parentage: Rosa 'Red Planet' × Rosa 'Franklin Engelmann'
- Cultivar group: Hybrid tea rose
- Cultivar: 'Precious Platinum'
- Marketing names: Red Star, 'Opa Pötschke'
- Breeder: Patrick Dickson
- Origin: Northern Ireland, 1974

Rosa 'Precious Platinum' is a medium red hybrid tea rose. It was bred by Patrick Dickson in Northern Ireland in 1974. The cultivar was introduced into Australia in 1977.

== History ==
Dickson Roses was established in 1836 by Alexander Dickson, who migrated from Perth, Scotland to Newtownards, County Down in Northern Ireland. Alexander's son George and George's two sons Alexander II and George II began a rose breeding program at the company in 1879. Alexander Patrick (Patrick) Dickson (1926–2012), started working for Dickson Roses in 1957 and began breeding roses for the company in 1958. During his career he introduced many successful rose varieties, including Rosa 'Sea Pearl' (1964), Rosa 'Grandpa Dickson' (1966), Rosa 'Red Devil' and Rosa 'Red Gold' (1967).

Dickson bred 'Precious Platinum' in 1974. The cultivar is a hybrid of Rosa 'Red Planet' and Rosa 'Franklin Engelmann'. It was introduced into Australia in 1977 as 'Precious Platinum'.

== Description ==
'Precious Platinum is a medium tall, upright shrub which grows up to 5 ft (152 cm) and has a 2 to 3 ft (30–60 cm) spread. The prolific, large flowers (35 petals) are fully double and high-centred in form. They have long, strong stems and are mildly fragrant. Flower colour ranges from red to deep crimson. Petals have an average diameter of 4.75 in (12 cm). The plant is well suited for cut flowers or garden. It blooms repeatedly from spring to fall. The dark green leathery foliage provides a good contrast to the flowers. The shrub has thorns, spines, prickles and teeth.

== Cultivation ==
The cultivar is suitable for mass plantings, as a hedge or grown in containers. It is regarded as easy to grow, being disease-resistant and tolerant of poor soils. It prefers a position in full sun.
