= Rosa 'Black Baccara' =

Burgundy red Hybrid tea rose cultivar

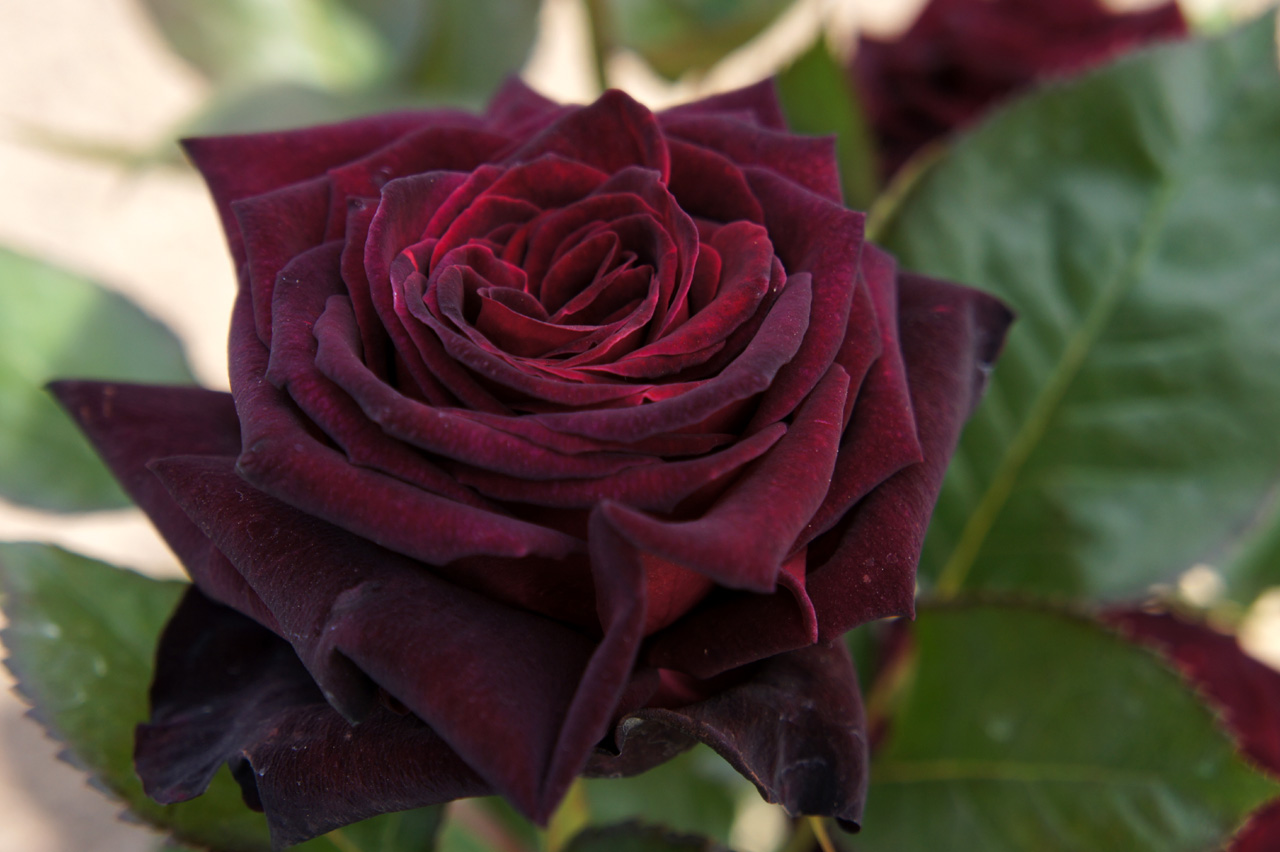
- Rosa 'Black Baccara'
- Genus: Rosa hybrid
- Hybrid parentage: 'Celica' x 'Fuego Negro'
- Cultivar group: Hybrid tea
- Cultivar: 'MEIdebenne'
- Breeder: Jacques Mouchotte
- Origin: France, 2000

Rosa 'Black Baccara' (aka 'MEIdebenne') is a dark burgundy Hybrid tea rose cultivar, bred by French rose hybridizer, Jacques Mouchotte, before 2000. Meilland International introduced the rose in France in 2000. The rose was also introduced in America by Star Roses and Plants/Conard-Pyle in 2002.

== Description ==
'Black Baccara' is a tall, upright hybrid tea rose, 5 to 6 ft (1.5–1.8 m) in height, with a 2 to 3 ft (0.61–0.91 m) spread. Bloom size ranges from 3 to 5 in (76–127 mm). It has a high-centered, very full (41+ petals) bloom form. The flowers are dark red-burgundy with a velvety texture. They are carried mostly solitary on strong, thick stems and bloom in flushes from spring to fall. Flowers have little or no fragrance. Foliage is dark green and glossy. 'Black Baccara' makes an excellent container plant.

== History ==
=== Meilland International ===
The Meilland family is a multi-generational family of French rose breeders. The family's first rosarian was gardener, Joseph Rambaux, who first started breeding roses in 1850 in Lyon. He is best known for developing the Polyantha 'Perle d'Or'. His wife, Claudine and son-in-law, Francois Dubreuil, took over the nursery after Rambaux died in 1878. Dubreuil became a successful rose breeder and grower. In 1900, Dubreuil hired sixteen year old, Antoine Meilland, as a gardening assistant, where Meilland worked alongside Dubreuil's daughter, Claudia. Antoine and Claudia married in 1909 and their son, Francis was born in 1912. The couple took over Dubreuil's nursery after his death in 1916.

After World War I, Antoine and Claudia bought property in Tassin-la-Demi-Lune, near Lyon and started a new nursery. Their son, Francis worked at the nursery and eventually took over the nursery. He expanded the rose business over several years into a large, international company, and became the most famous and prolific rose breeder in the family. His legendary 'Peace' rose, brought the family international attention and great commercial success when it was introduced after World War II. The Meilland family merged their business with Francisque Richardier in 1946, so that Francis Meilland could focus solely on breeding roses.

After Francis's early death in 1958, his wife Louisette continued to breed roses, introducing many awarding winning new varieties. The new company, Meilland-Richardier grew into Meilland International (AKA House of Meilland), and is located in Le Luc en Provence, France. Francis and Louisette's children, Alain and Michele, were both successful rose breeders for the company. In 1978, Jacques Mouchotte took over the company's rose breeding program, and developed a large number of new rose varieties until his retirement in 2013. Some of his most popular rose varieties are 'Bonica 82', 'Debut', 'Carefree Wonder', and 'Carefree Delight'. Meilland International continues to be 100% family owned and managed.

=== 'Black Baccara' ===
'Black Baccara' was developed by Jacques Mouchotte before 2000 by crossing the two dark red Hybrid teas, 'Celica' and 'Fuego Negro'. The rose cultivar was introduced in France by Meilland International in 2000, and in America by Star Roses and Plants/Conard-Pyle in 2002. 'Black Baccara' was used to hybridize one child plant, Rosa 'Vampire', before 2012.
