= Rosa 'Pope John Paul II' =

Rose cultivar

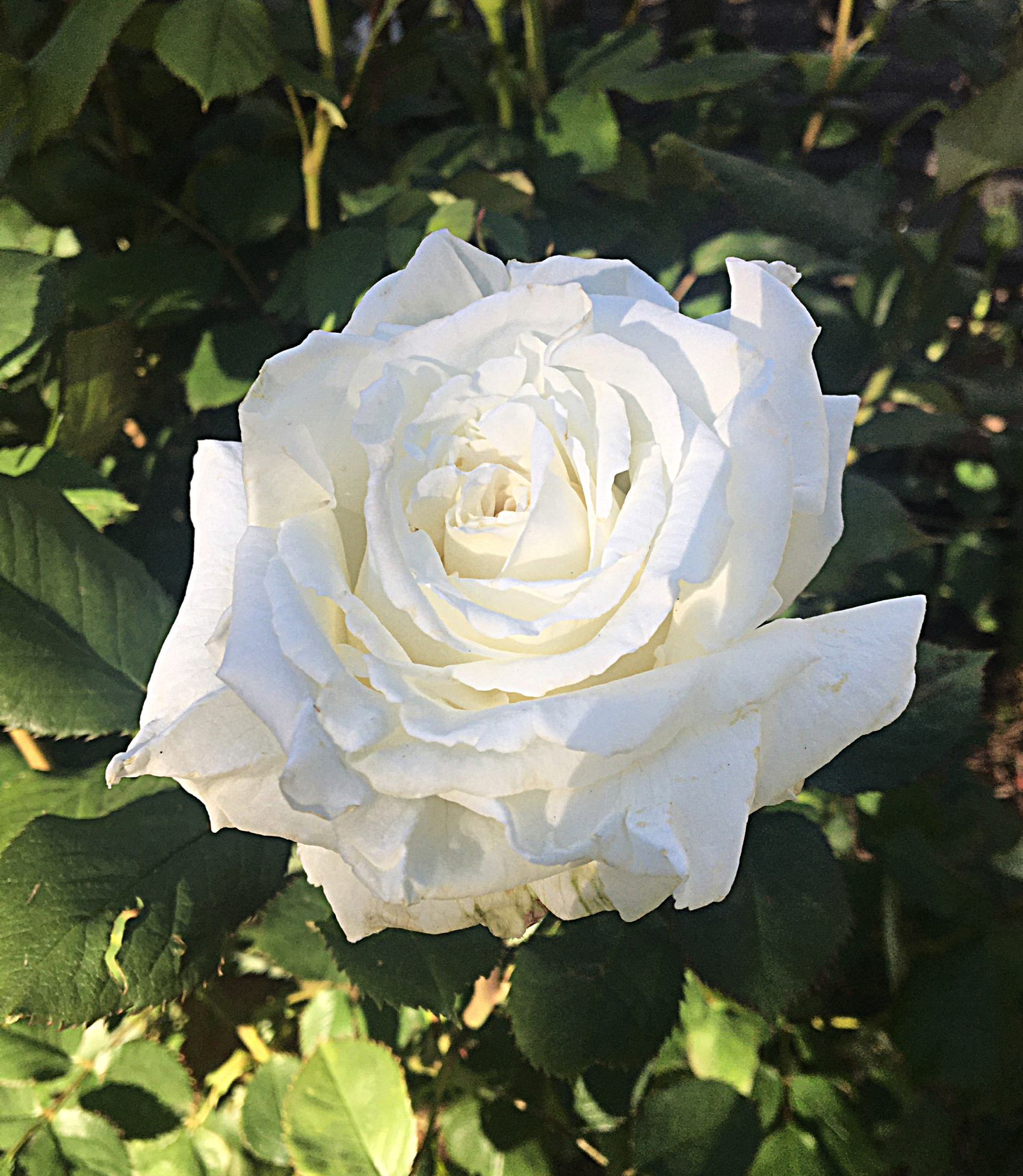
- Rosa 'Pope John Paul II'
- Genus: Rosa 'Hybrid'
- Hybrid parentage: Secret (hybrid tea) x Fragrant Lace (hybrid tea)
- Cultivar group: Hybrid tea
- Cultivar: JACsegra
- Marketing names: Pope John Paul II
- Origin: United States, Keith W. Zary (2006)

The Rosa 'Pope John Paul II' is a white Hybrid tea rose cultivar, developed by Jackson & Perkins in honor of Pope John Paul II.

== History ==
'Pope John Paul II' was created by American rose breeder, Dr. Keith W. Zary in 2006, and was introduced into the United States in 2013 by Jackson & Perkins. The new rose was created in honor of the late Pope John Paul II. The pure white rose was specifically chosen by the Vatican, and was planted in the Vatican gardens in 2013 overlooking Saint Peter's Basilica.

The Pope John Paul II rose was included in the 2020 White House Rose Garden renovation by First Lady Melania Trump in honor of the first time a pope visited the White House in 1979.

== Description ==
'Pope John Paul II' is a perennial medium-tall upright shrub 4 to 5 feet (122–152 cm) in height with a 3 to 4 feet (91–122 cm) spread. It produces over 50 large petals that are a luminous, white blooms 5 inches (13 cm) in diameter. Flowers have a strong, citrus fragrance. 'Pope John Paul II' is disease resistant and has dark green foliage. The shrub grows well in USDA plant hardiness zone 5 through 9.

== See also ==
- Garden roses
- Rose Hall of Fame
- List of Award of Garden Merit roses
