= Rosa 'Perfume Delight' =

Pink hybrid tea rose cultivar

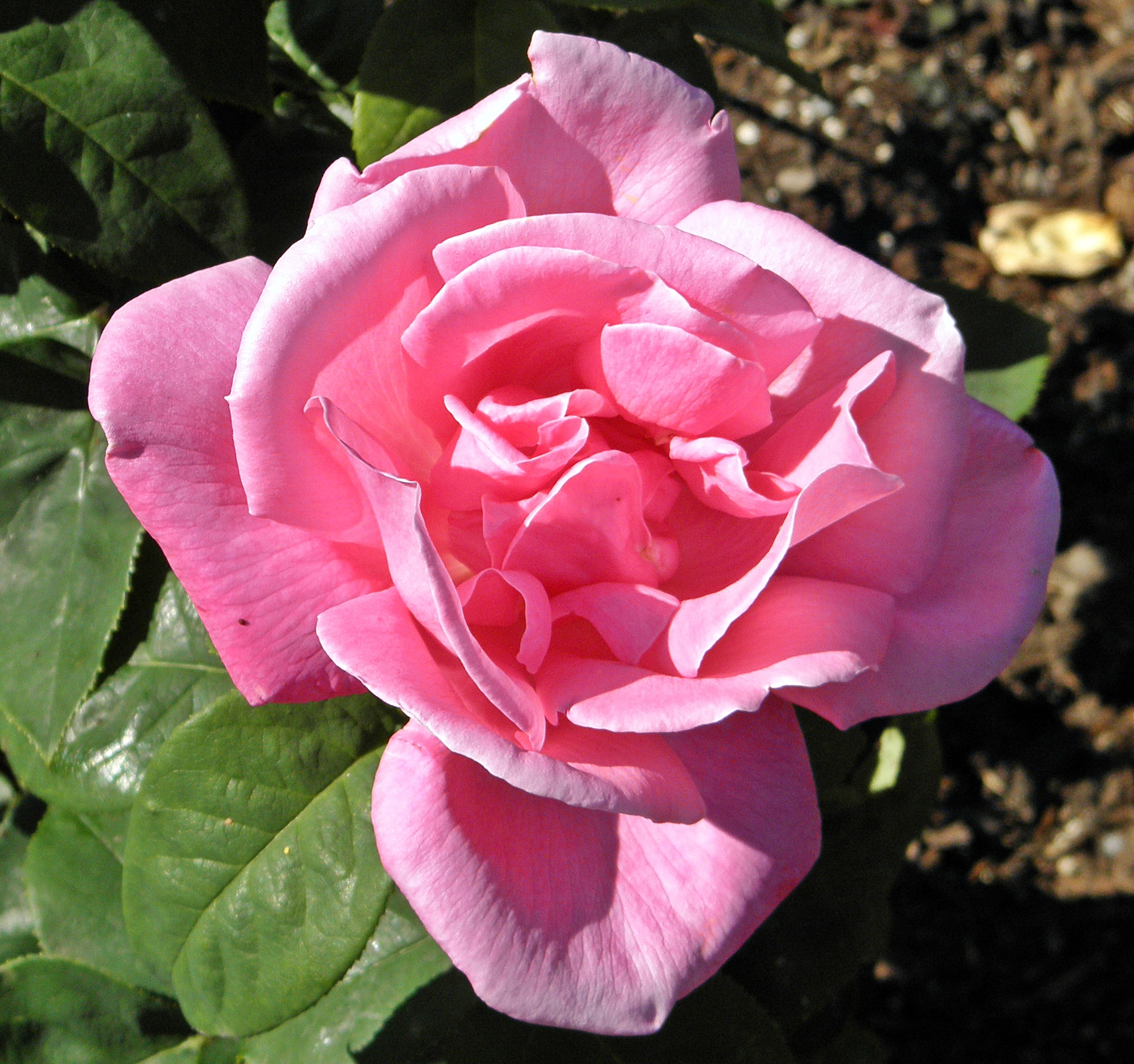
- Rosa 'Perfume Delight'
- Genus: Rosa hybrid
- Hybrid parentage: 'Peace' x (('Rouge Meilland' x 'Chrysler Imperial') x 'El Capitan')
- Cultivar group: Hybrid tea rose
- Marketing names: 'Perfume Delight'
- Breeder: Swim & Weeks
- Origin: United States, 1973

Rosa 'Perfume Delight' is a pink hybrid tea (HT) rose cultivar, bred by Herbert Swim and O. L. Weeks, Weeks Rose Growers, in 1973. The rose was named an All-America Rose Selections winner in 1974.

== Description ==
'Perfume Delight' is a bushy upright shrub, up to 4 ft (121 cm) in height with a 3 ft (91 cm) spread. Petals are typically 4-5 inches, with a high-centered, cupped form. Flowers open a deep rose and fade to pink. Blooms are rain resistant and have a strong, sweet fragrance. 'Perfume Delight' is a disease resistant plant, with large, glossy, leathery foliage. It thrives in USDA zone, 6 and warmer. The plant is almost continuously in bloom from spring through fall.

'Perfume Delight' tends to have more black spot disease issues than its HT peers and even its own hybridized cultivars.

== Awards ==
- All-America Rose Selections winner, USA, (1974)

== Gallery ==
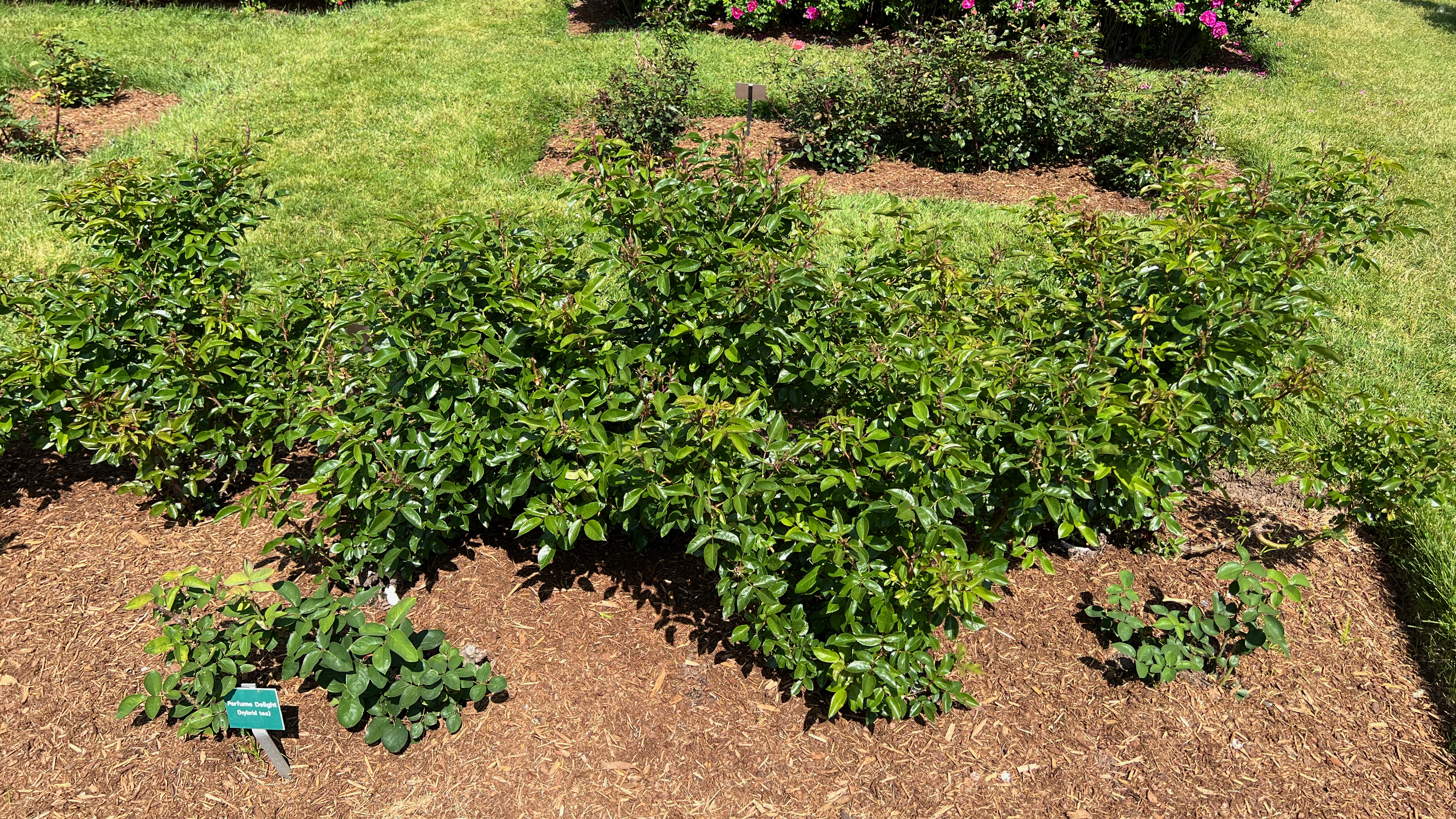
'Perfume Delight' tea rose bushes at Elizabeth Park Conservancy

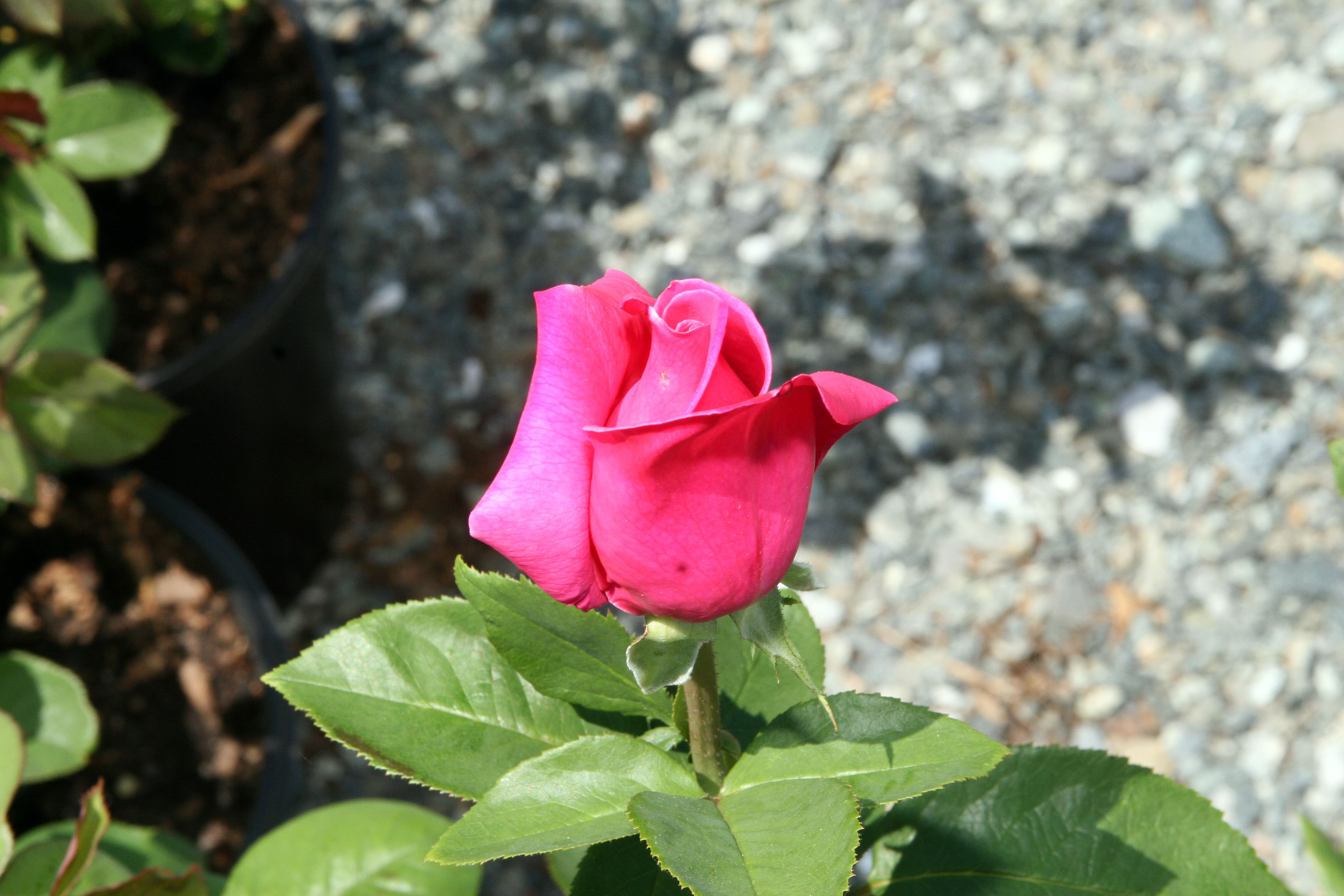
'Perfume Delight' bud

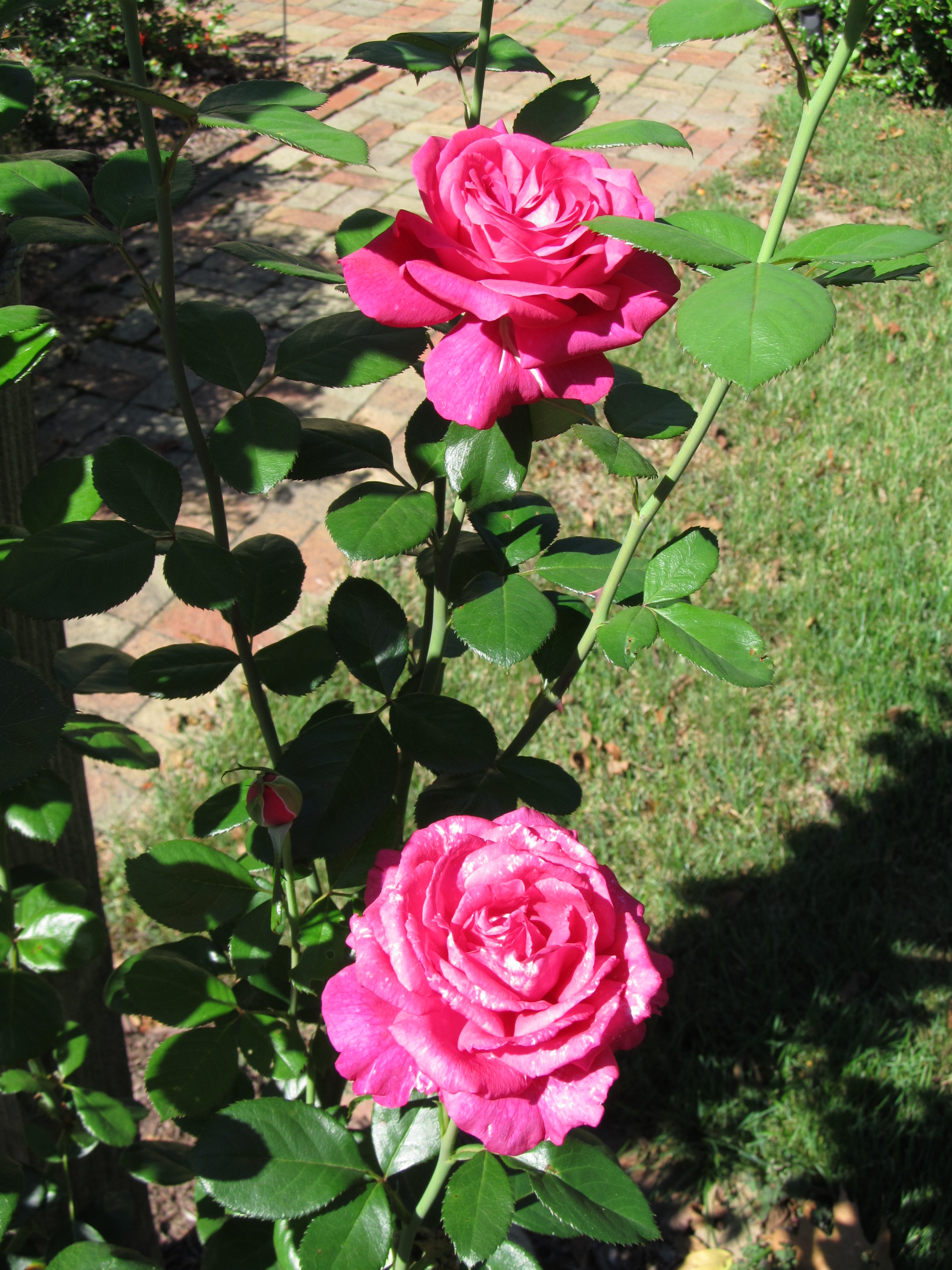
'Perfume Delight' hybrid tea rose with misplaced white-color petal mutations

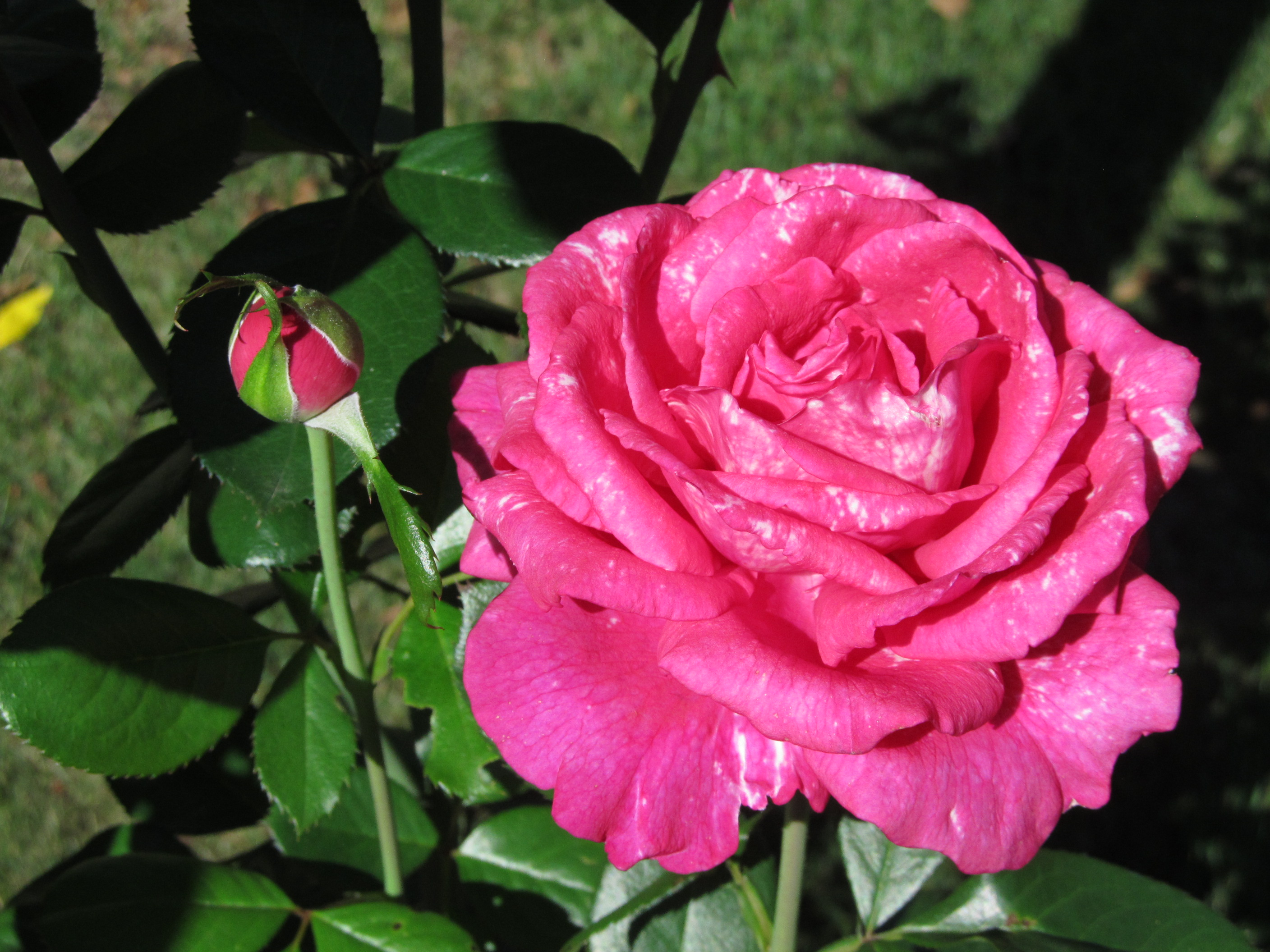
'Perfume Delight' hybrid tea rose with misplaced white-color petal mutations

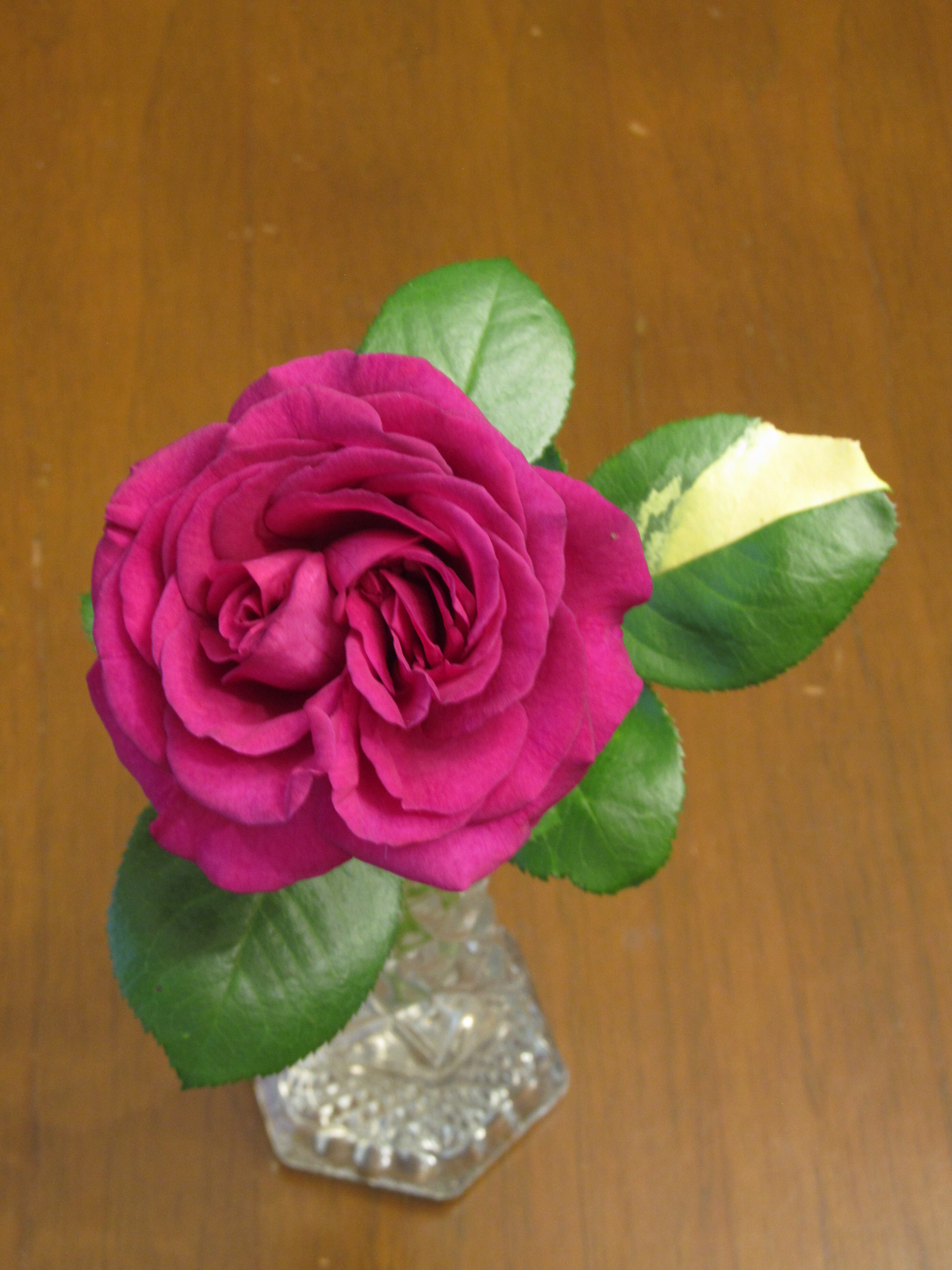
'Perfume Delight' hybrid tea rose with double whorl and leaf color mutations

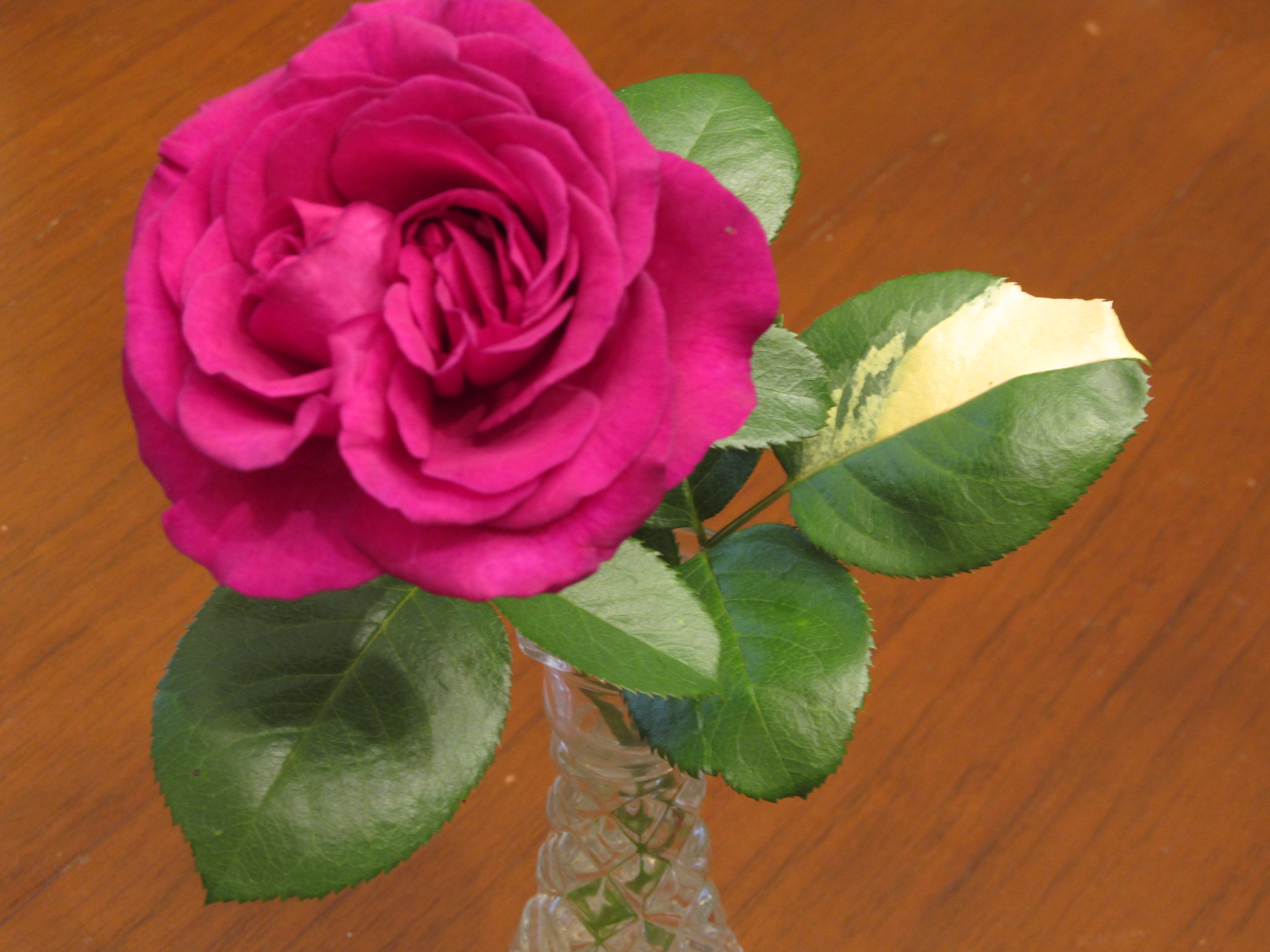
'Perfume Delight' hybrid tea rose with double whorl and leaf color mutations

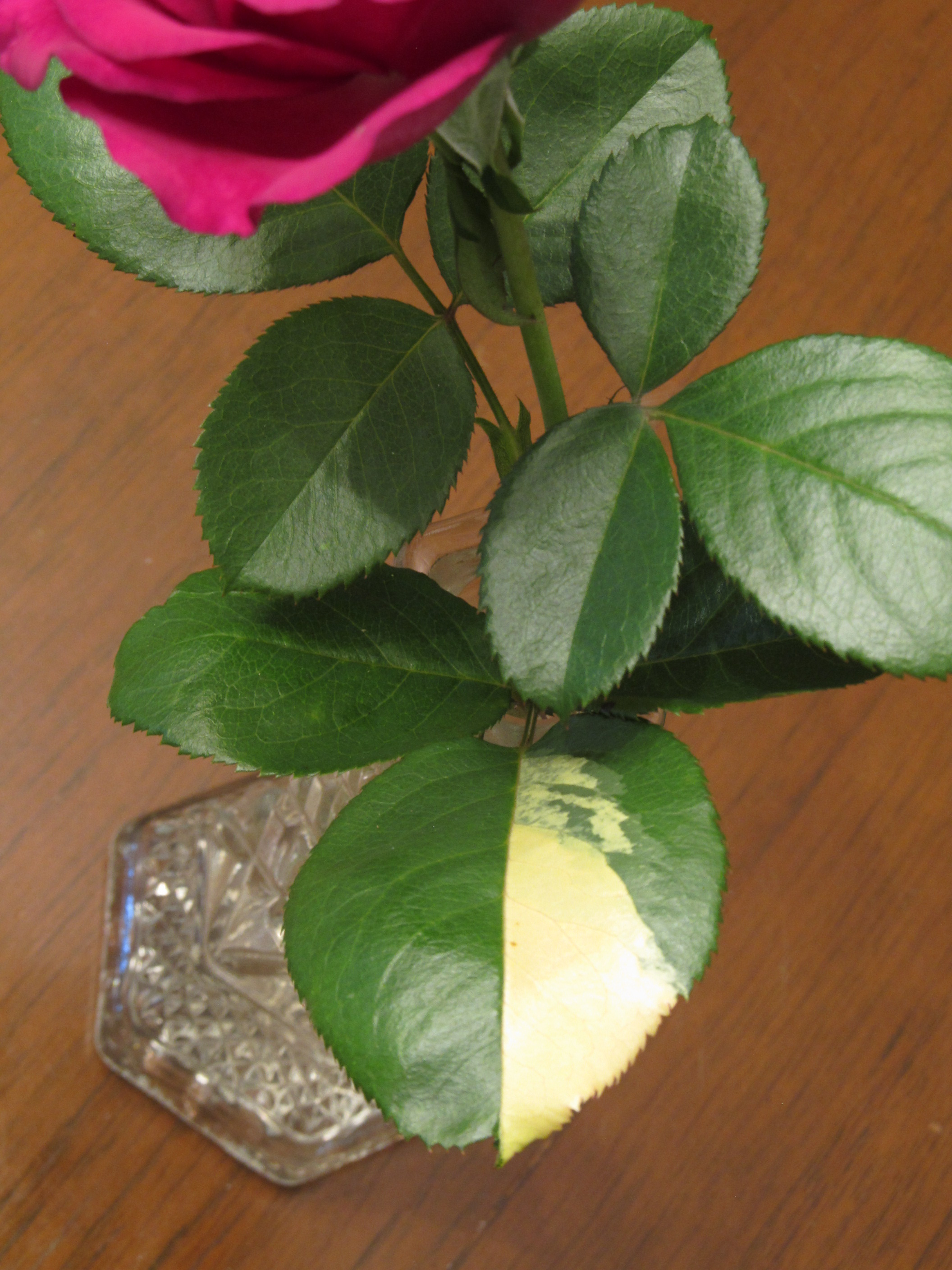
'Perfume Delight' hybrid tea rose with leaf color and apex mutations

== See also ==
- Garden roses
- Rose Hall of Fame
- List of Award of Garden Merit roses
