= Rosa 'King's Ransom' =

Rose cultivar

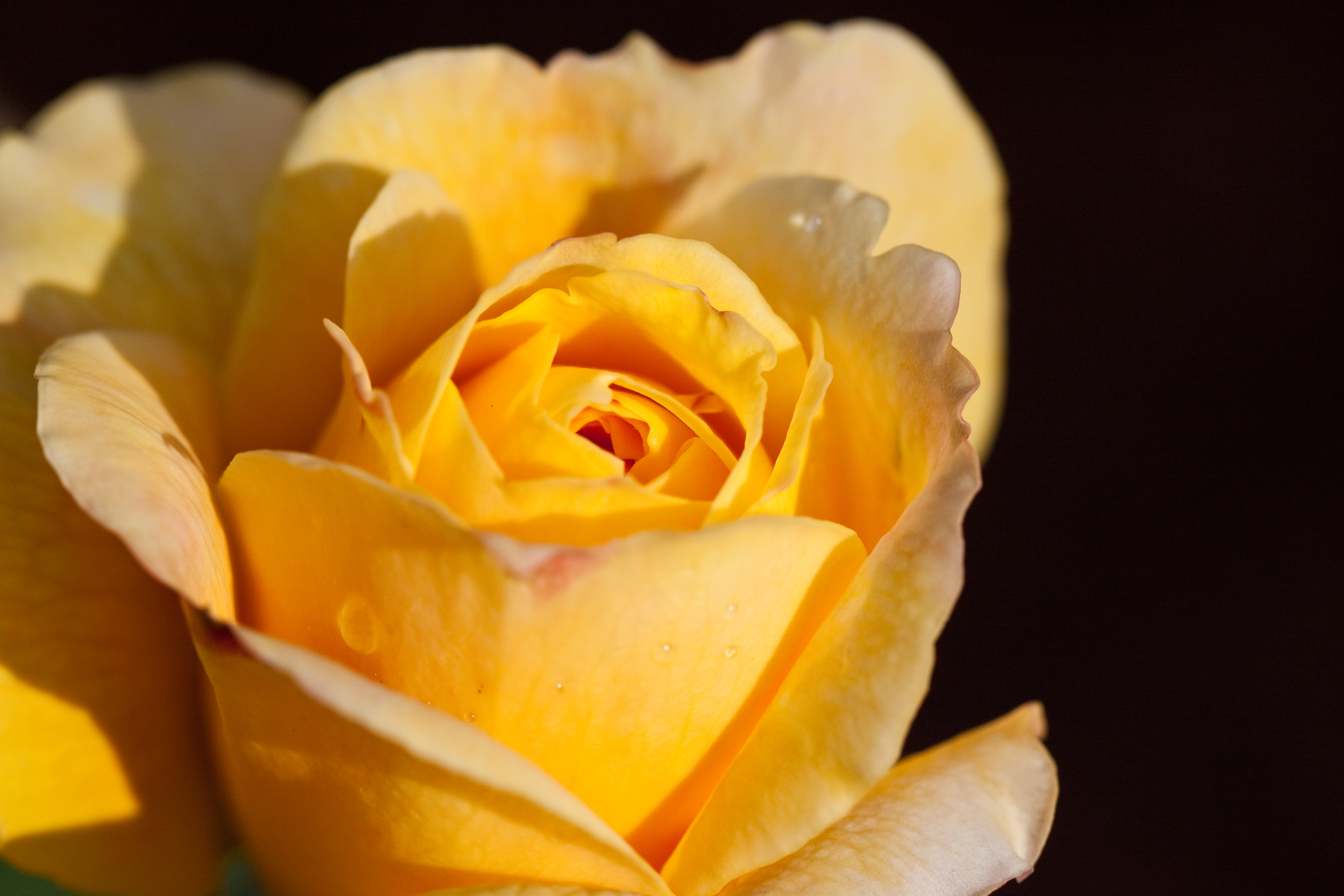
- Rosa 'King's Ransom'
- Genus: Rosa hybrid
- Hybrid parentage: 'Golden Masterpiece' x 'Lydia'
- Cultivar group: Hybrid tea rose
- Marketing names: 'King's Ransom'
- Breeder: Dr. Dennison Morey
- Origin: US, 1961

Rosa 'King's Ransom' is a deep yellow hybrid tea rose cultivar, developed by American horticulturalist and rosarian Dr. Dennison Morey in 1961. The rose was named an All-America Rose Selections winner in 1962.

== Description ==
'King's Ransom' was bred by American plant geneticist, rose hybridizer and horticultural historian Dr. Dennison Morey in 1961. Jackson & Perkins introduced the cultivar in the US in 1962. The rose was developed from a cross of Hybrid tea rose 'Golden Masterpiece' and 'Lydia'. It was used to hybridize 13 new cultivars. The cultivar was named an All-America Rose Selections winner in 1962.

'King's Ransom' is a vigorous medium upright shrub, 30 inches (76 cm) to 5 feet (152 cm) in height. Blooms are 4–5 inches (10–13 cm) in diameter, with 26 to 40 petals. The rose has a strong fragrance. The high-centered, deep yellow petals appear singly or in small clusters and do not fade, even in the hottest climates. The shrub is a repeat bloomer, has many prickles and glossy green leaves. The shrub grows well in USDA plant hardiness zone 7b and warmer.

== Child plants ==
- Rosa 'Ambassador', (1978)
- Rosa 'Big Apple', (1983)
- Rosa 'Cary Grant', (1987)
- Rosa 'Centennial Star, (1996)
- Rosa 'Ivory Tower', (1979)
- Rosa 'Medallion', (1973)
- Rosa 'Pigalle', (1983)
- Rosa 'Roberta Bondar', (1987)
- Rosa 'Spectra', (1983)
- Rosa 'Sunblest', (1970)

== See also ==
- Garden roses
- Rose Hall of Fame
- List of Award of Garden Merit roses
