= Rosa 'Oklahoma' =

Rose cultivar

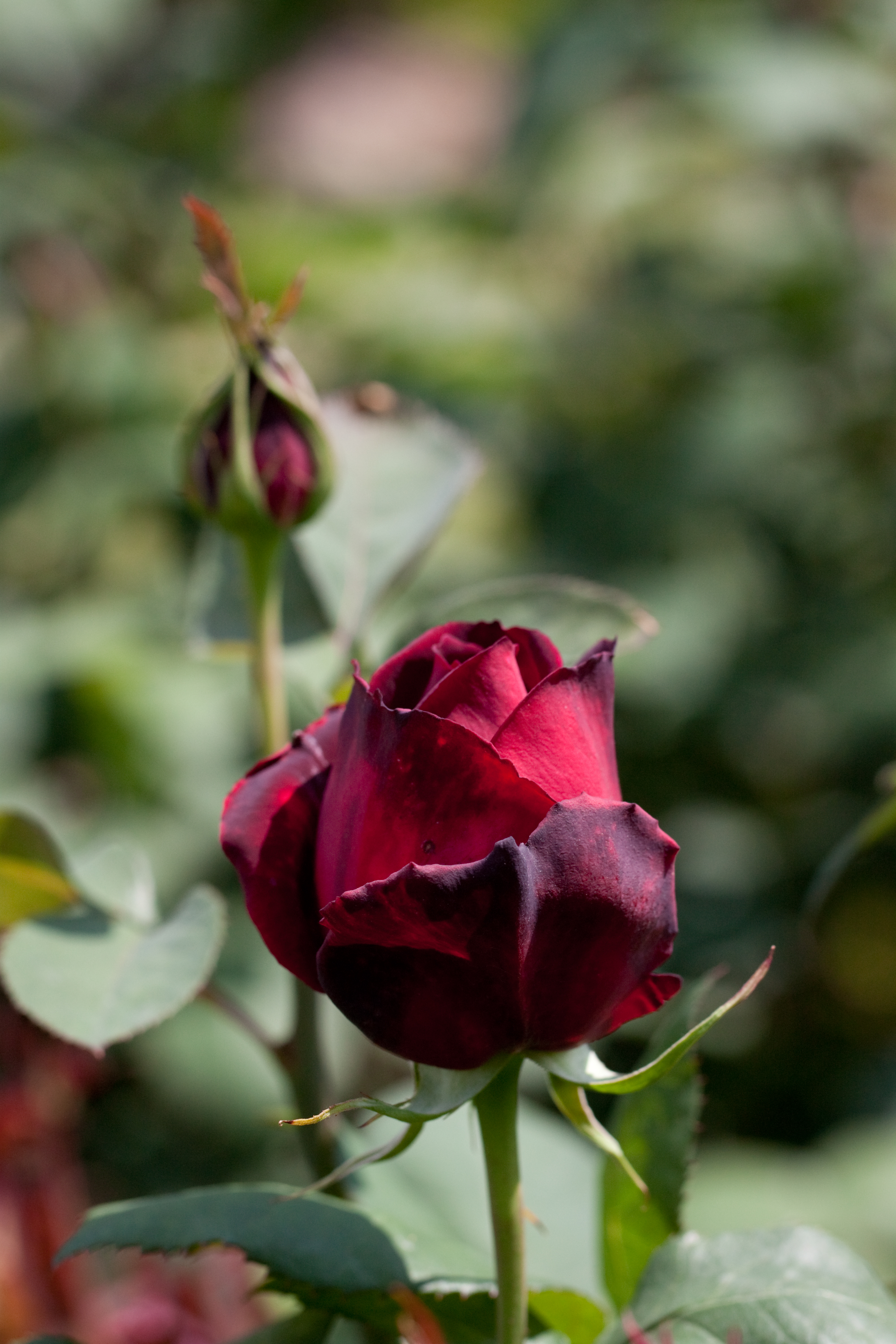
- Hybrid parentage: Rosa hybrid R. 'Chrysler Imperial' x R. 'Charles Mallerin'
- Cultivar group: Hybrid tea
- Cultivar: 'Oklahoma'
- Origin: Herbert C.Swim, O.L. Weeks, United States, 1964.

The Rosa 'Oklahoma' is a dark red rose cultivar with a strong and sweet fragrance. The hybrid tea rose was developed at Oklahoma State University by Herbert C. Swim and O. L. Weeks before 1963 and introduced in 1964. It was hybridised from the cultivars 'Chrysler Imperial' (Lammerts, 1952) and 'Charles Mallerin' (Meilland, 1947).

In 2004, the Oklahoma Rose became the official state flower of Oklahoma.
