= Rosa 'Francis Meilland' =

Hybrid tea rose cultivar

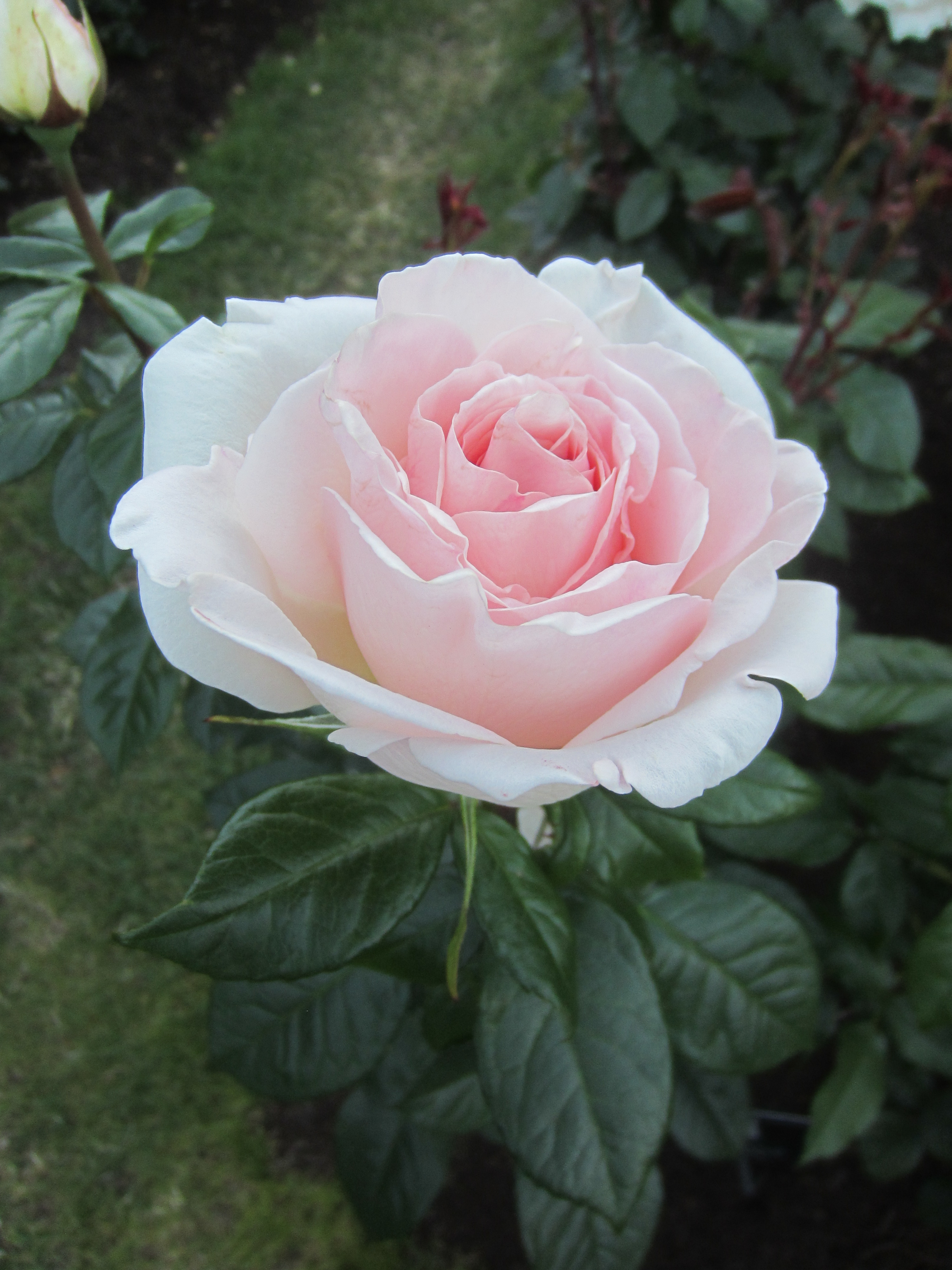
- Rosa 'Francis Meilland'
- Genus: Rosa hybrid
- Cultivar group: Hybrid tea rose
- Cultivar: MEItroni
- Marketing names: 'Francis Meilland' 'Schloss Ippenburg' 'Father of Peace' 'Prince Jardinier'
- Breeder: Alain Meilland
- Origin: France, 2006

Rosa 'Francis Meilland', also known as 'Schloss Ippenburg' or 'Prince Jardinier', is a light pink Hybrid tea rose cultivar. The rose was developed by Alain Meilland in France in 2006, and has won multiple awards in Europe and the United States.

== History ==
Rosa 'Francis Meilland', also known as Rosa 'Schloss Ippenburg', was introduced in France in 2006, developed by rose breeder, Alain Meilland, of Meilland International. The new rose was named in honor of legendary French horticulturalist, Francis Meilland (1912-1958). Francis Meilland is recognized for creating the 'Peace' rose, originally introduced as Rosa 'Madame A. Meilland' in 1942. The rose is considered the "most famous rose in the world and still the most widely grown". 'Francis Meilland' was the last rose to be named as an All-America Rose Selections winner in 2013.

== Description ==
'Francis Meilland' is a tall upright Hybrid tea rose, 5 to 7 ft (150–210 cm) in height with a 2 to 3 ft (60–91 cm) spread. The high-centered to cupped blooms are 4-5 in (10–12 cm) in diameter, and can have 40 to 80 petals in small clusters. Flowers are light pink in color, fading to white. The rose has a strong, old rose scent, and can bloom in flushes from spring through fall. 'Francis Meilland' is a disease resistant plant with dark, semi-glossy green foliage.

== Awards ==
- ADR rose, Germany, (2008)
- All-America Rose Selections winner, USA, (2013)
- Pauline Merrell Award for Best Hybrid Tea Rose at Biltmore International Rose Trials, USA, (2014)

== See also ==
- Garden roses
- Rose Hall of Fame
- List of Award of Garden Merit roses
