= Hybrid tea rose =

Type of garden roses

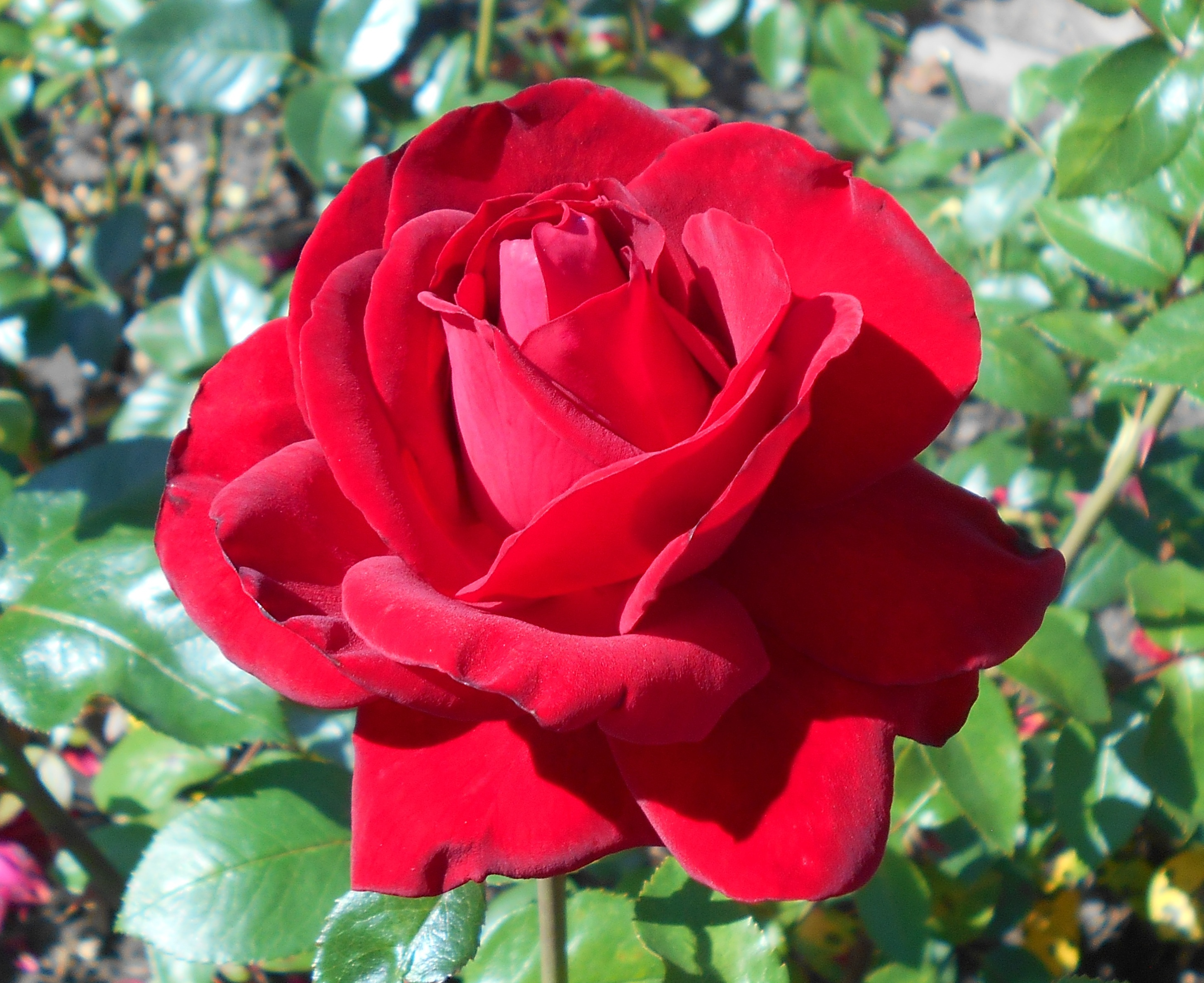
"Ingrid Bergman" variety of hybrid tea rose

Hybrid tea is an informal horticultural classification for a group of garden roses. The first hybrid tea roses were created in France in the mid-1800s, by cross-breeding the large, floriferous hybrid perpetuals with the tall, elegant tea roses. The hybrid tea is the oldest class of modern garden roses. Hybrid teas exhibit traits midway between their parents, being hardier than the often delicate tea roses, and with a better ability for repeat-flowering than the more robust hybrid perpetuals.

Hybrid tea flowers are well-formed with large, high-centred buds, supported by long, straight and upright stems. Each flower can grow to 8–12.5 cm wide. Hybrid teas are the largest and most popular group of rose, due to their elegant form and large variety of colours. Their flowers are usually borne singly at the end of long stems which also makes them very popular as cut flowers.

== Description ==
Hybrid tea is an informal horticultural classification for a group of garden roses. Hybrid teas are the largest and most popular rose class, due to their elegant form and large variety of colours. They are known for their long, elegant pointed buds that open slowly. Hybrid teas have a high-centered bloom form and are carried singly or with several side buds. Each flower can grow to 3–8 cm (1–3 in) wide. Plants tend to grow quickly and will reach 0.9–2.4 m (3–8 ft) in height in just a few years. Hybrid teas are grown in a large variety of colors, except blue.

Hybrid tea propagation is usually done by budding, a technique that involves grafting buds from a parent plant onto hardy, disease-resistant rootstocks. One such rootstock is R. multiflora. Gardeners can propagate hybrid tea roses on their own roots by taking cuttings in spring, then rooting and growing them in a protected location for their first year. Plants grown from cuttings, are not as hardy as the mother plant, less disease-resistant and may not live as long as grafted plants.

== History ==
=== Early hybrid teas ===
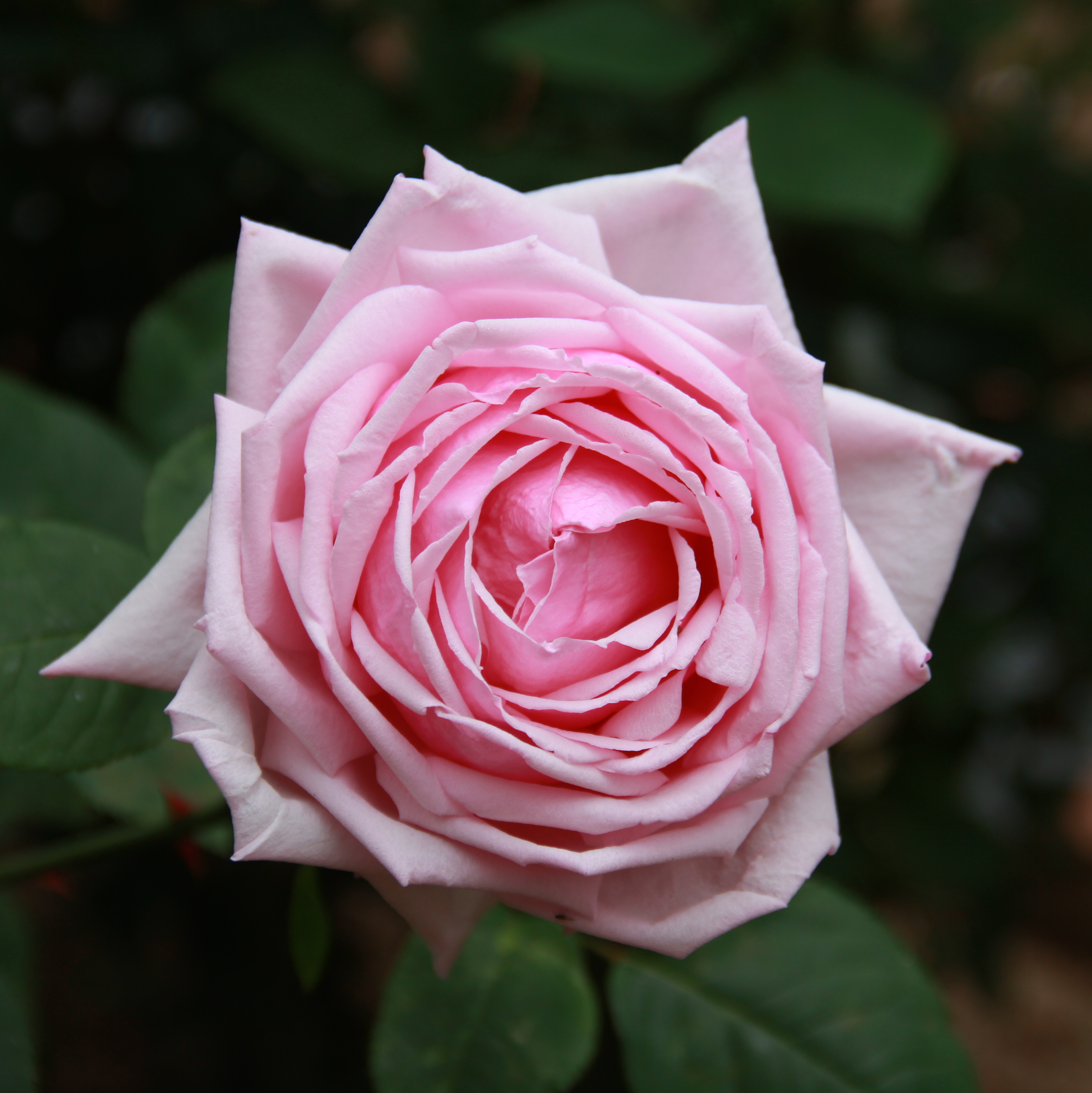
'La France'

Hybrid teas became a new class of roses in 1879, when British rose breeder, Henry Bennett, introduced ten "Pedigree Hybrids of the Tea Rose" in Stapleford, Wiltshire. Bennett's first attempts at rose breeding on his Wiltshire farm in 1868 were unsuccessful. He visited prominent rose breeders in France from 1870 to 1872 to further his knowledge of rose breeding. Returning home, he constructed heated greenhouses on his farm and expanded his rose breeding program. When he introduced his ten new hybrid tea roses in 1879, they were an immediate success.

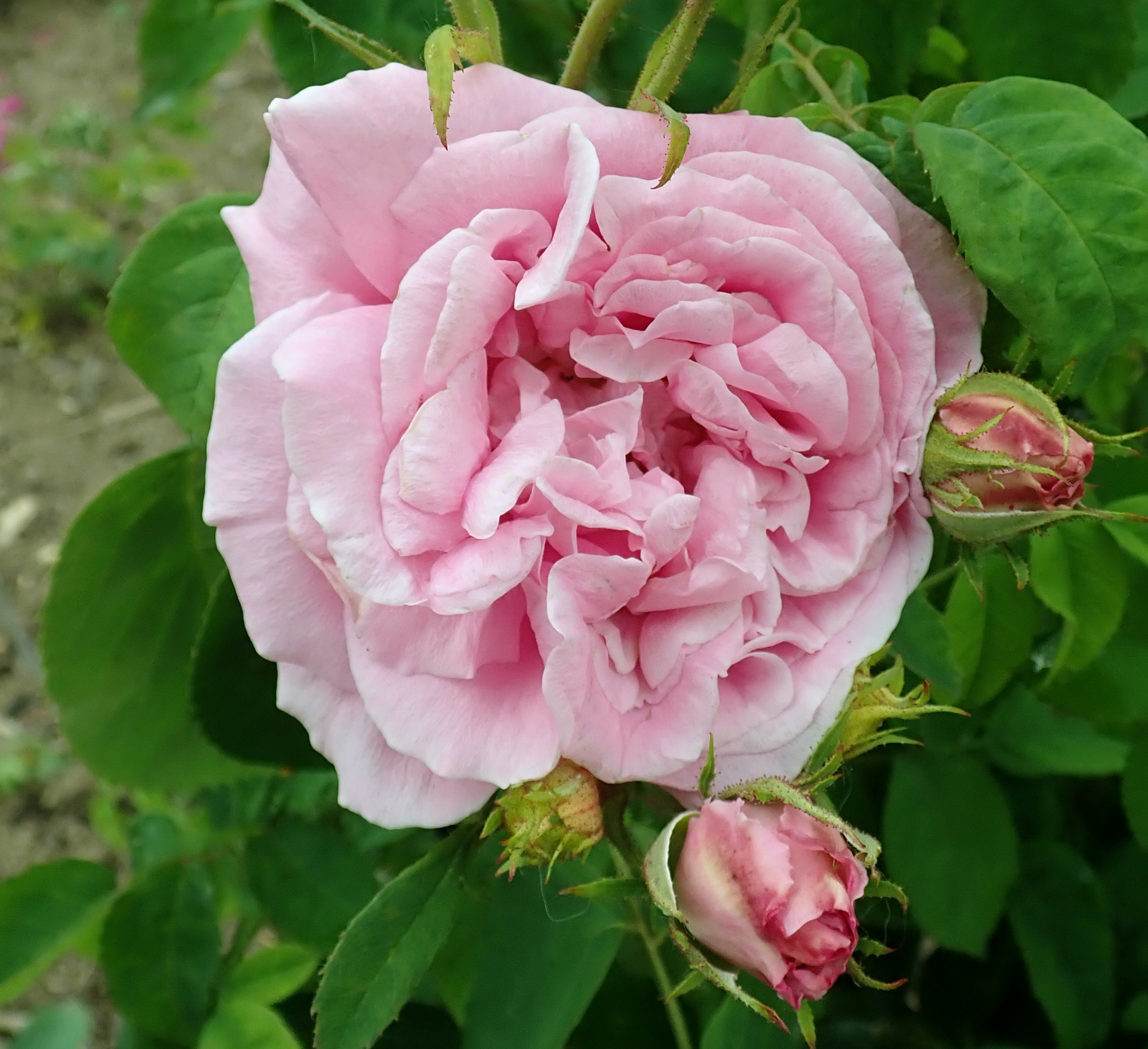
'Victor Verdier'

'La France', bred by Jean-Baptiste André Guillot and introduced in France in 1867, has been acknowledged by several rose historians as the first hybrid tea rose. Other rose historians have suggested that the earliest hybrid tea roses were developed a decade earlier. These early roses are: 'Elise Masson', 'Léonore d'Este' and 'Gigantique' in 1849 as well as 'Adèle Bougere' in 1852. 'Victor Verdier', bred by Frenchman François Lacharme and introduced in 1859, is a strong candidate for being the first hybrid tea. 'Victor Verdier' was the successful result of a cross between a Hybrid Perpetual and a Tea rose, and was classified as a Hybrid Perpetual when it was first introduced. According to British horticulturalist and rose expert, Graham Stuart Thomas, "In 1859 'Victor Verdier' appeared, and this has sometimes been called the first Hybrid Tea. From this and 'La France', raised in 1867, a small group of varieties were raised, carrying strong Tea influence into the Hybrid Perpetuals."

=== Modern hybrid tea ===
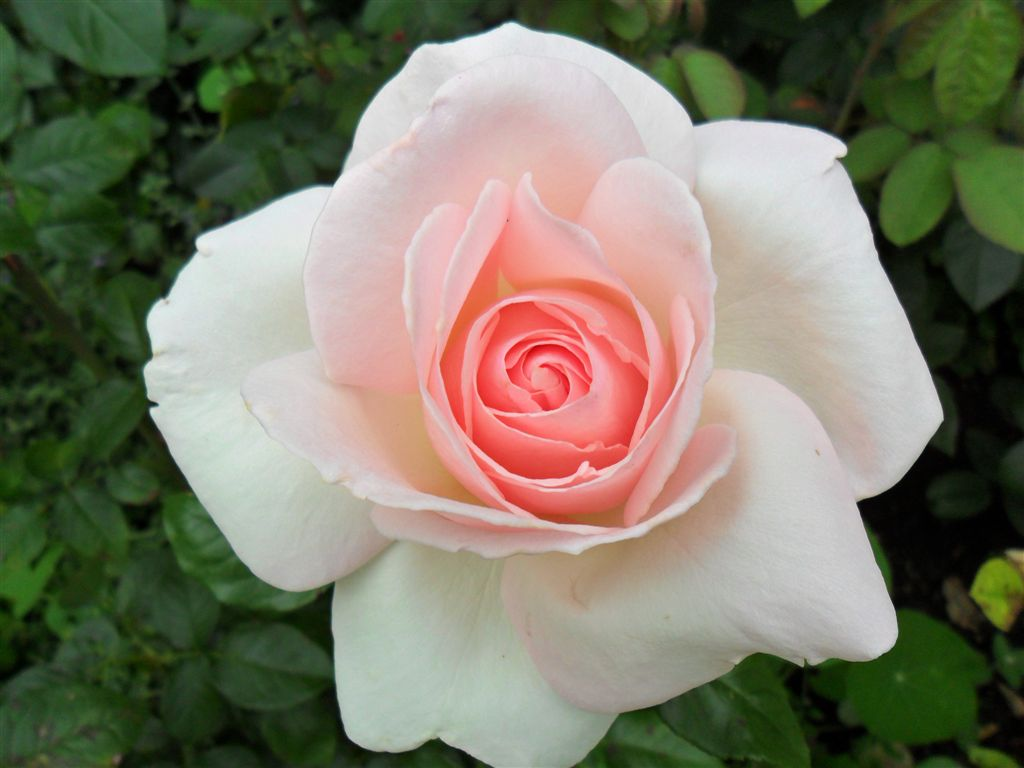
'Francis Meilland'

Hybrid tea roses did not become popular until the beginning of the 20th century, when French rose breeder, Joseph Pernet-Ducher, introduced the cultivar 'Soleil d'Or' in 1900. 'Soleil d'Or' is the first yellow rose introduced and the ancestor of the modern hybrid tea rose. Some of Pernet-Ducher's early successes are considered to be two of the most popular of all the 19th century Hybrid tea roses: 'Madame Caroline Testout' (1890) and 'Mme Abel Chatenay' (1895). The city of Lyon in France became at the time an epicenter of hybrid tea cultivation with rose growers such as Joseph Bonnaire, Alexandre and Pierre Bernaix, Jean-Baptiste André Guillot or Joseph Schwartz. The rose that made hybrid teas the most popular class of garden rose of the 20th century was the rose Peace, introduced by Francis Meilland at the end of World War II, and is considered to be the most popular rose cultivar of the 20th century.

The most important modern hybrid tea rose breeders of the 20th century are: William Warriner, the Sam McGredy family, Tom Carruth, the Meilland family, Mathias Tantau, Wilhelm Kordes, Harkness Roses, Cants of Colchester, and Dickson Roses. Among the most popular of the 20th century hybrid teas include: 'George Dickson' (1912), 'Étoile de Hollande' (1919), 'Dainty Bess' (1925)', Crimson Glory (1935), 'Ena Harkness' (1946), 'Just Joey' (1972) 'Double Delight' (1977), 'Brigadoon' (1991) and 'Francis Meilland' (2006).

== Selected hybrid tea roses ==
=== Red varieties ===
- 'Chrysler Imperial'
- 'Mister Lincoln'
- 'Precious Platinum'
- 'Double Delight'
- 'Olympiad'
- 'Black Bacarra'
- 'Papa Meilland'
- 'Oklahoma'
- 'Red Bacarra'

=== Pink varieties ===
- 'Royal Highness'
- 'Paul Transon'
- 'First Prize'
- 'Perfume Delight'
- 'Duet'
- 'Miss All-American Beauty'

=== Yellow varieties ===
- 'King's Ransom'
- 'Elina'
- 'Peace'
- 'Henry Fonda'

=== Orange varieties ===
- 'Voodoo'
- 'Fragrant Cloud'
- 'Just Joey'
- 'Tequila Sunrise'

=== White varieties ===
- 'Pascali'
- 'Pope John Paul II'
- 'Honor'
- 'Garden Party'

=== Lilac varieties ===
- 'Blue Moon'
- 'Charles de Gaulle'

== Gallery ==
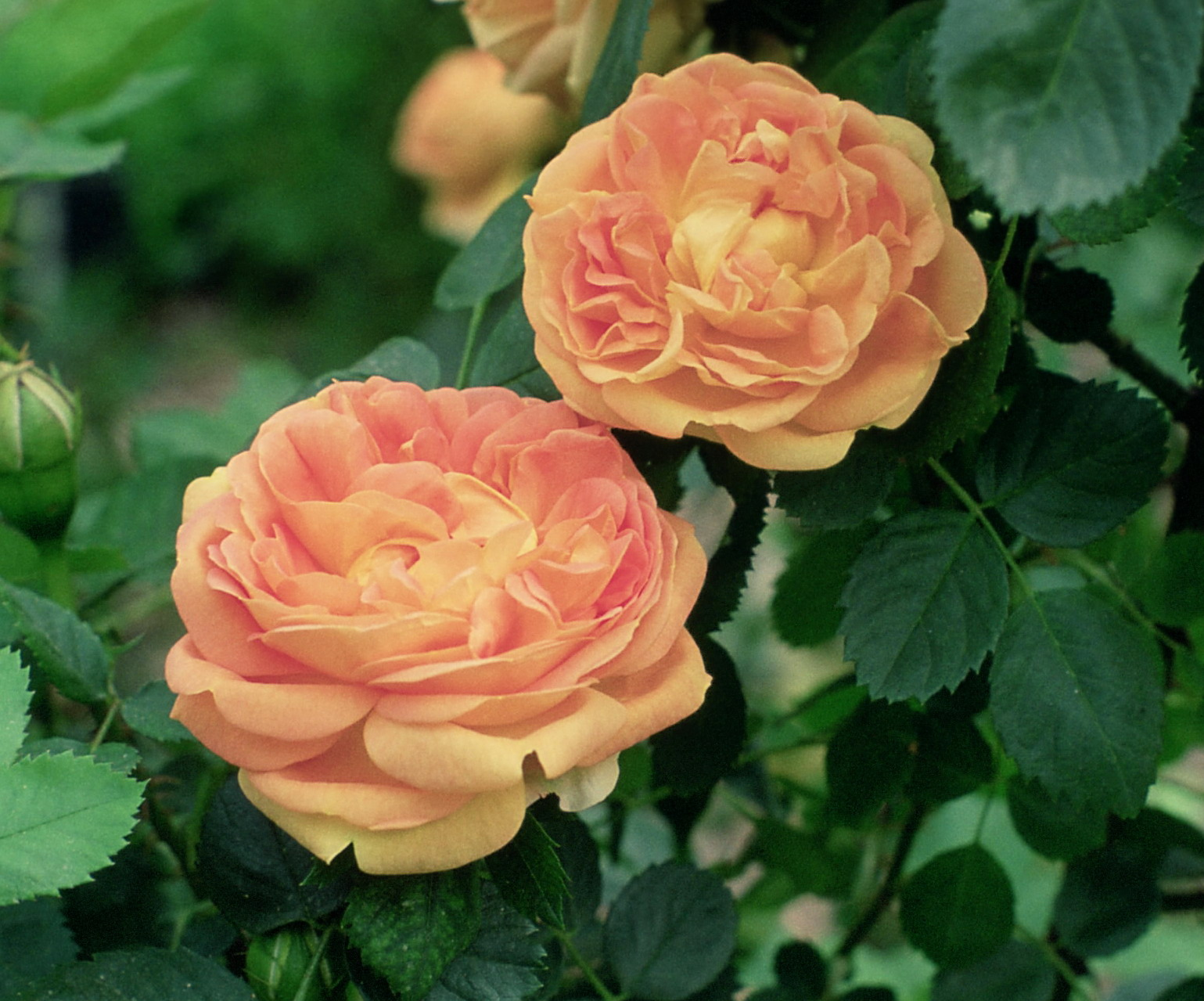
'Soleil d'Or'

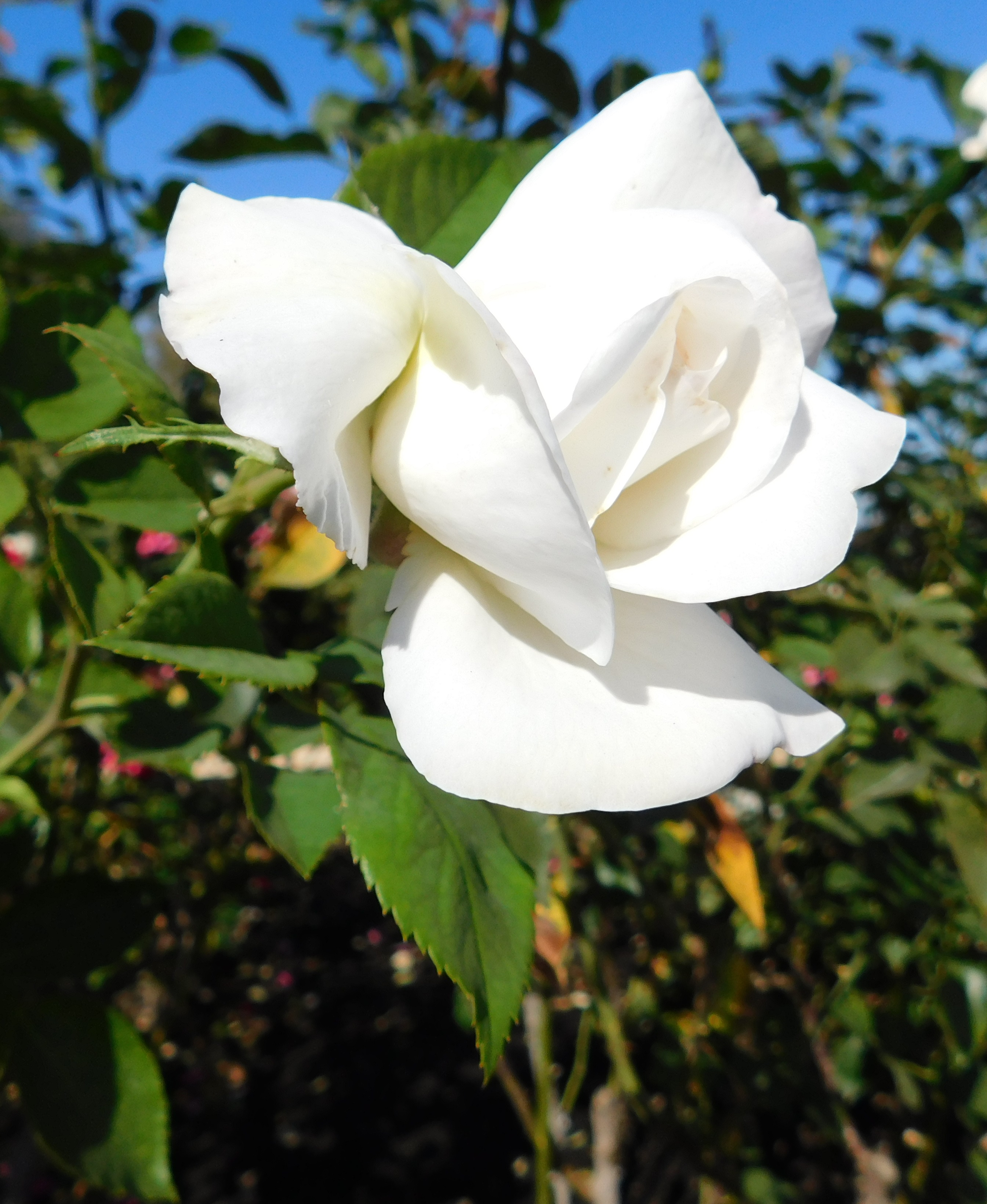
'Sugar Moon'

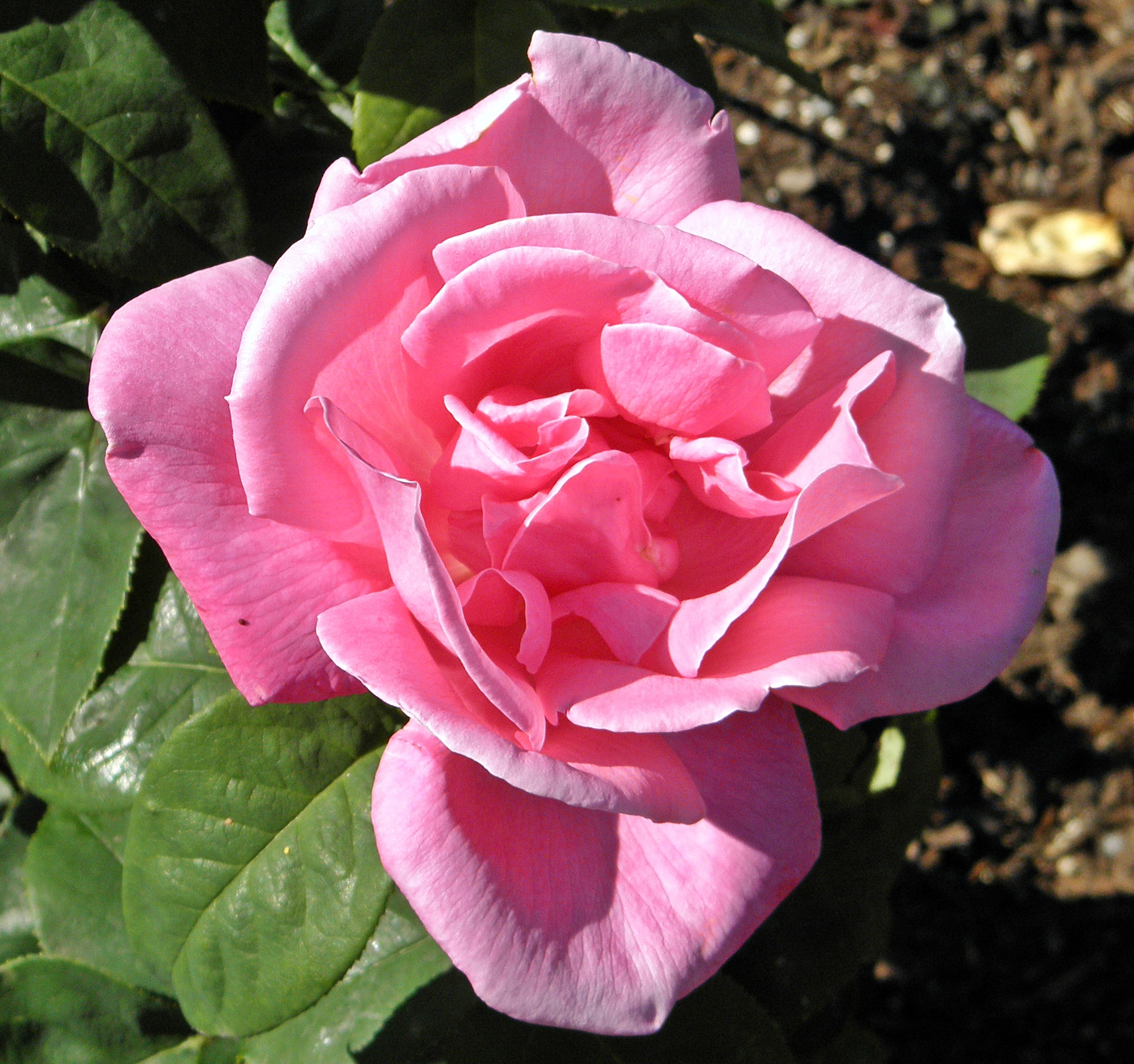
'Perfume Delight'

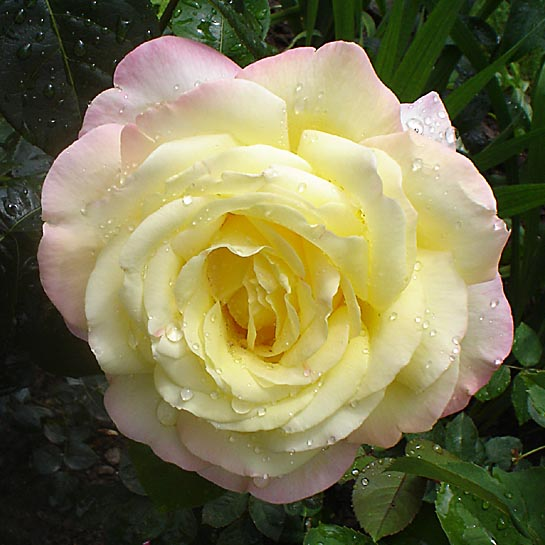
'Peace'

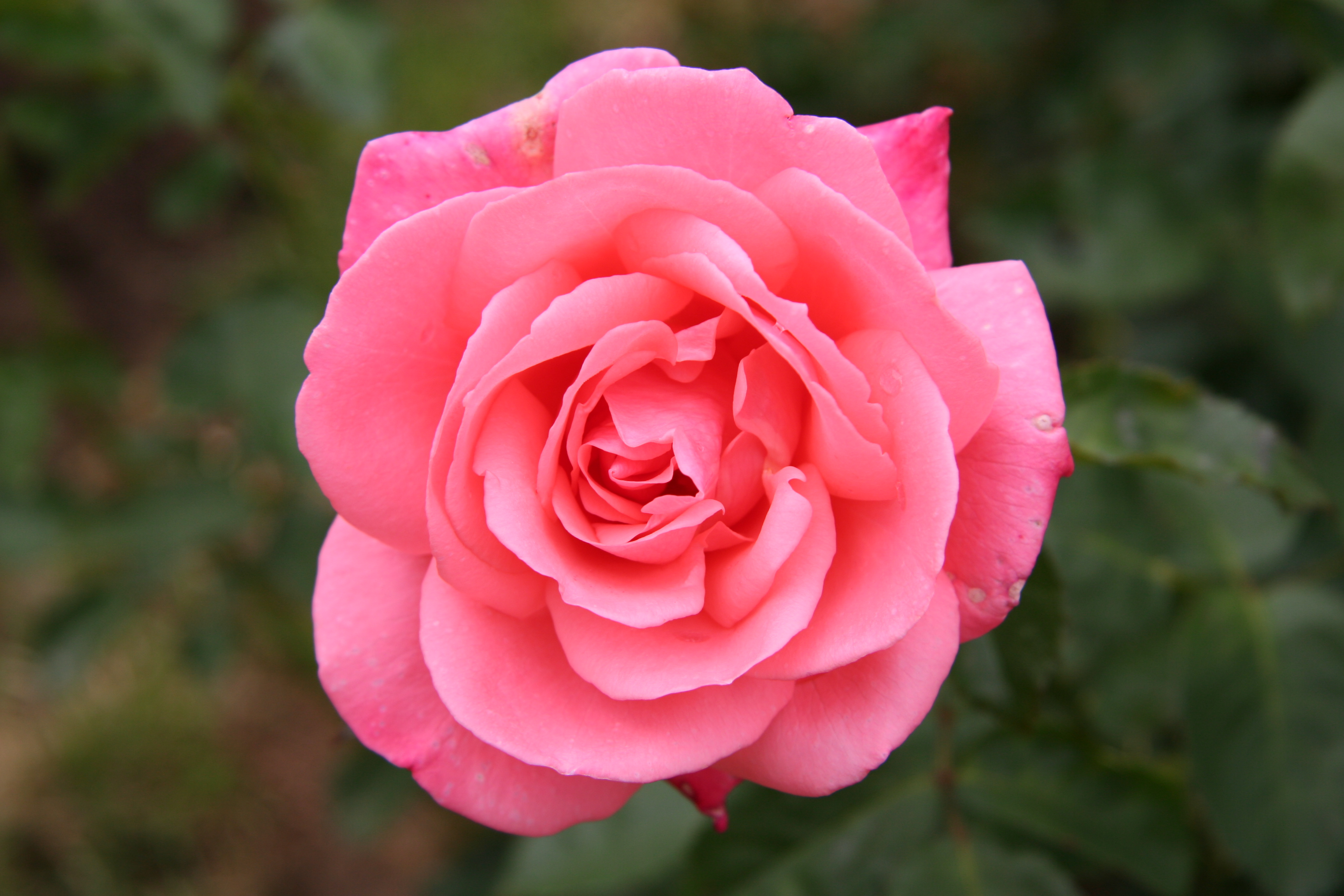
'Fontaline'

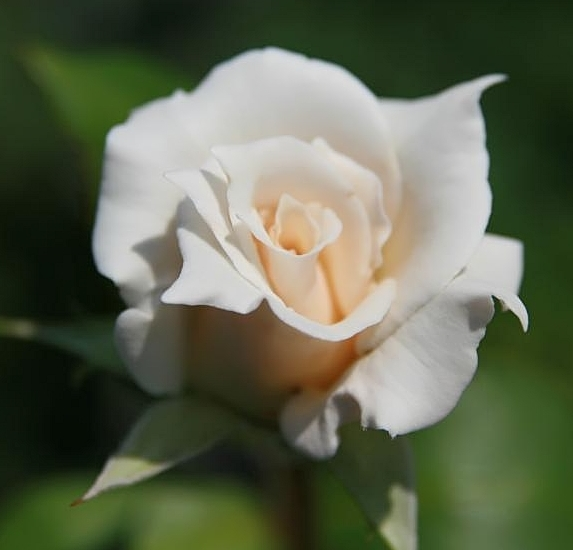
Rosa 'Pascali'

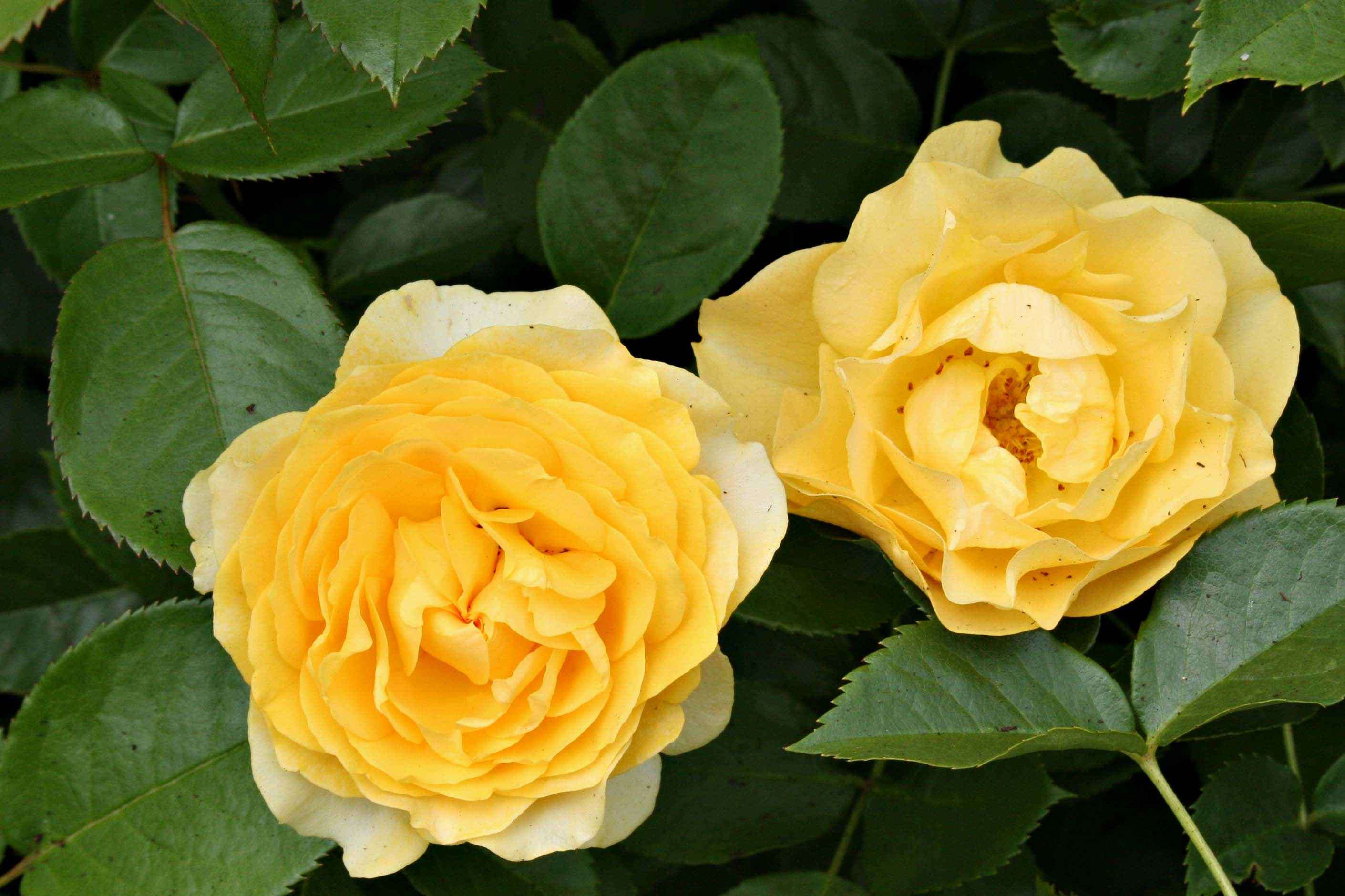
'Julia Child'

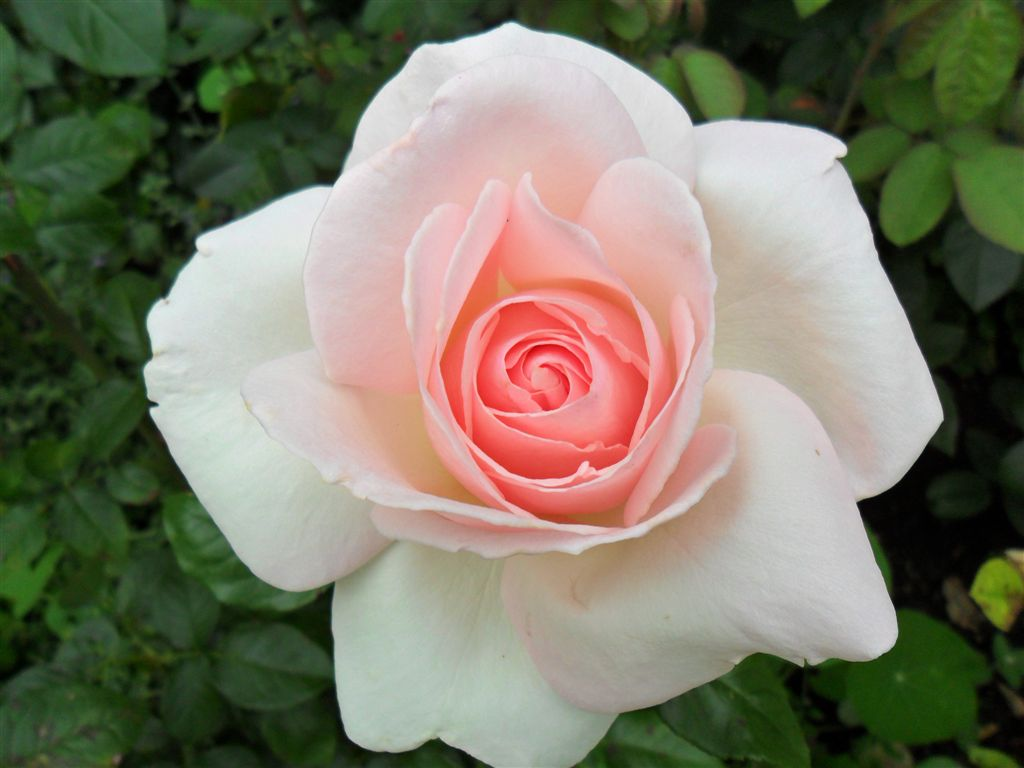
'Francis Meilland'

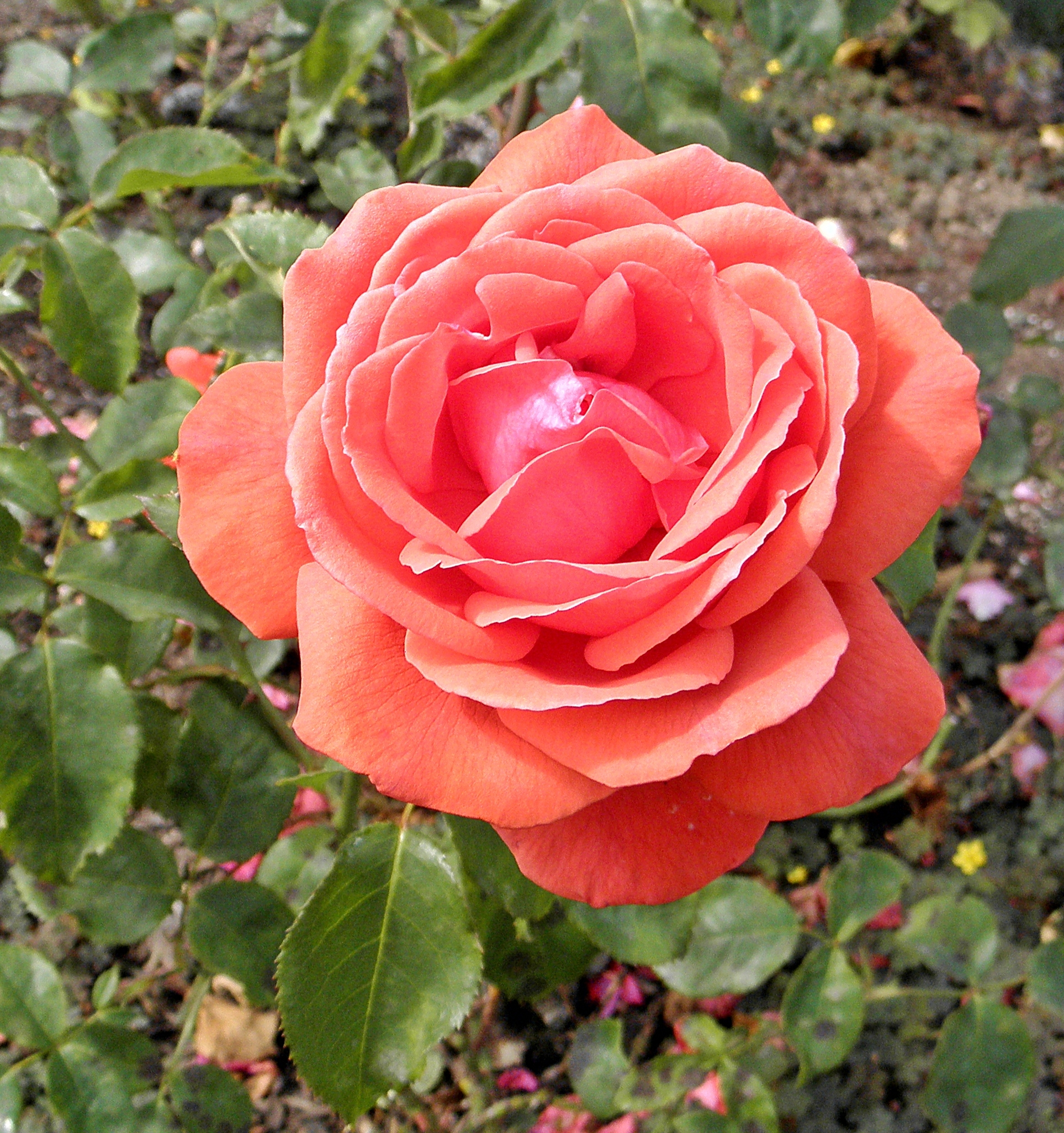
'Fragrant Cloud'

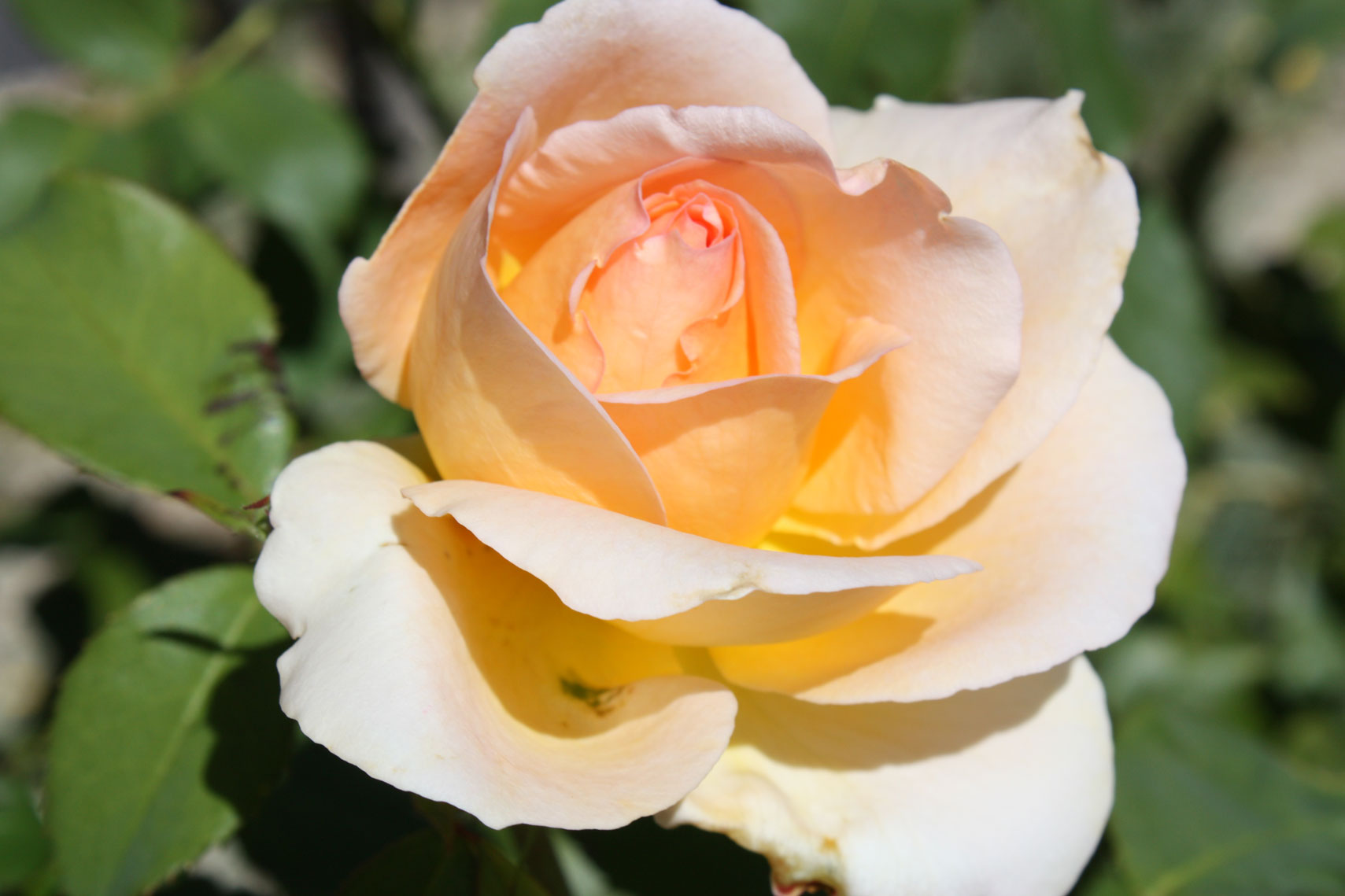
'Just Joey'

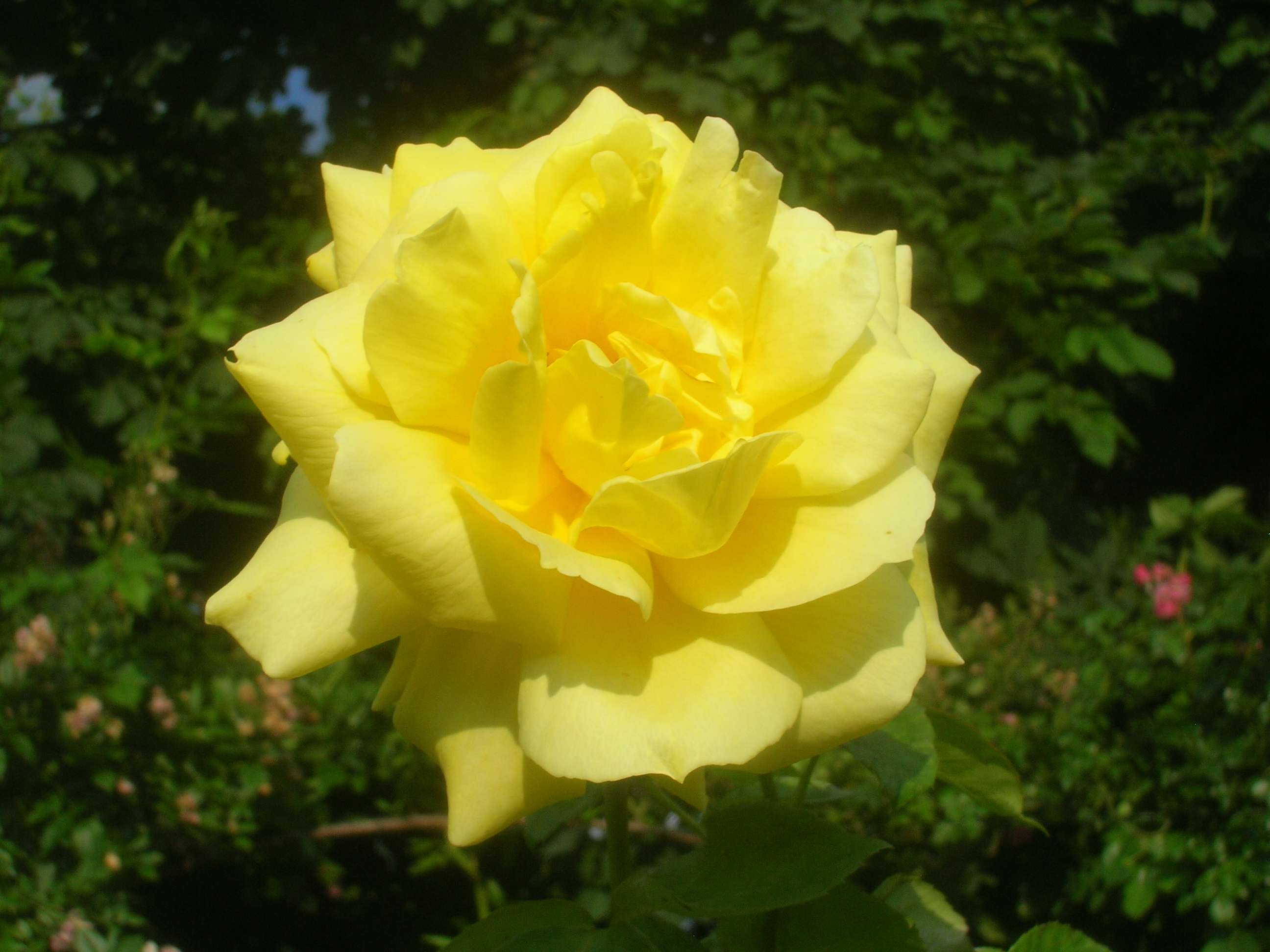
'Oregold'

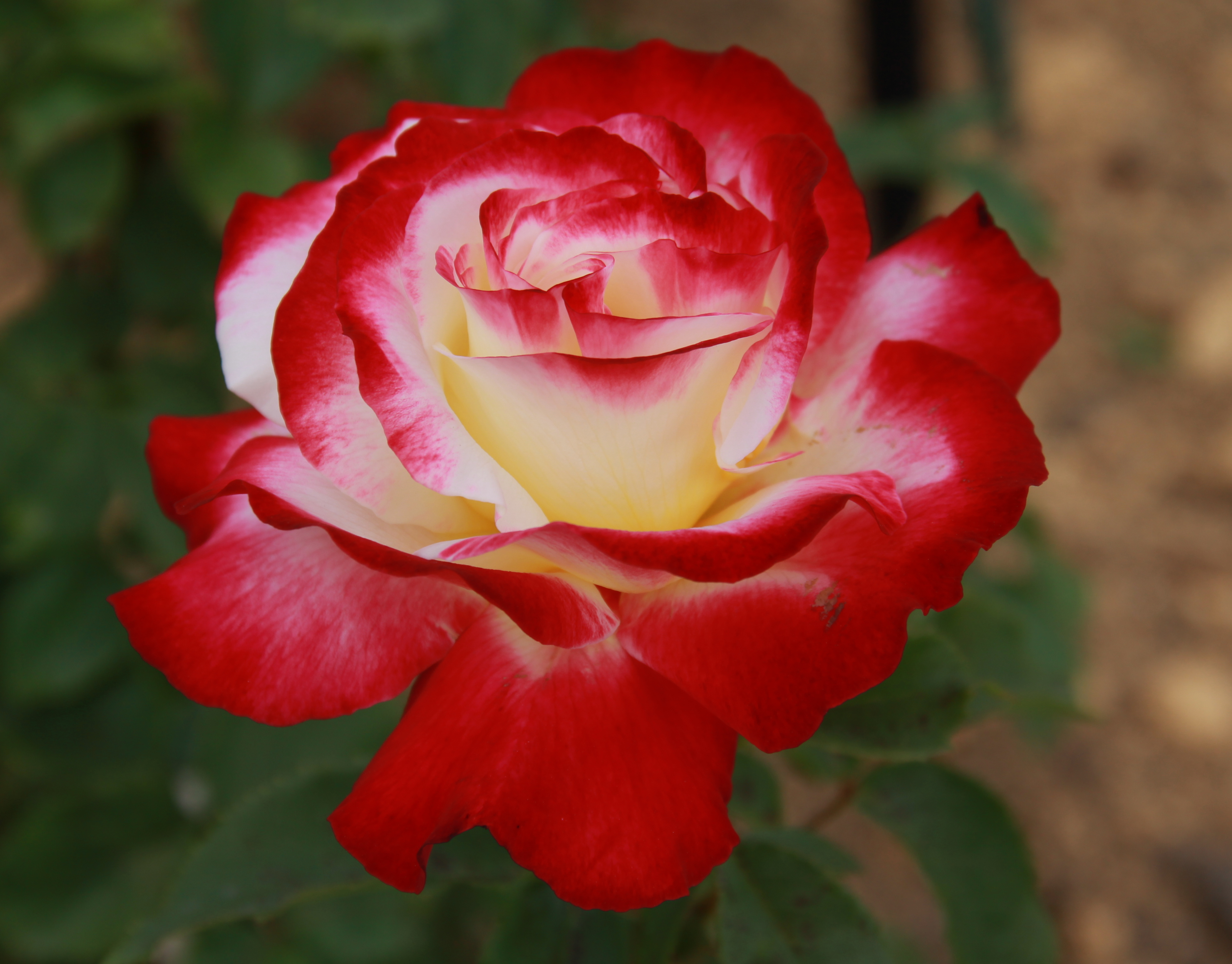
'Double Delight'

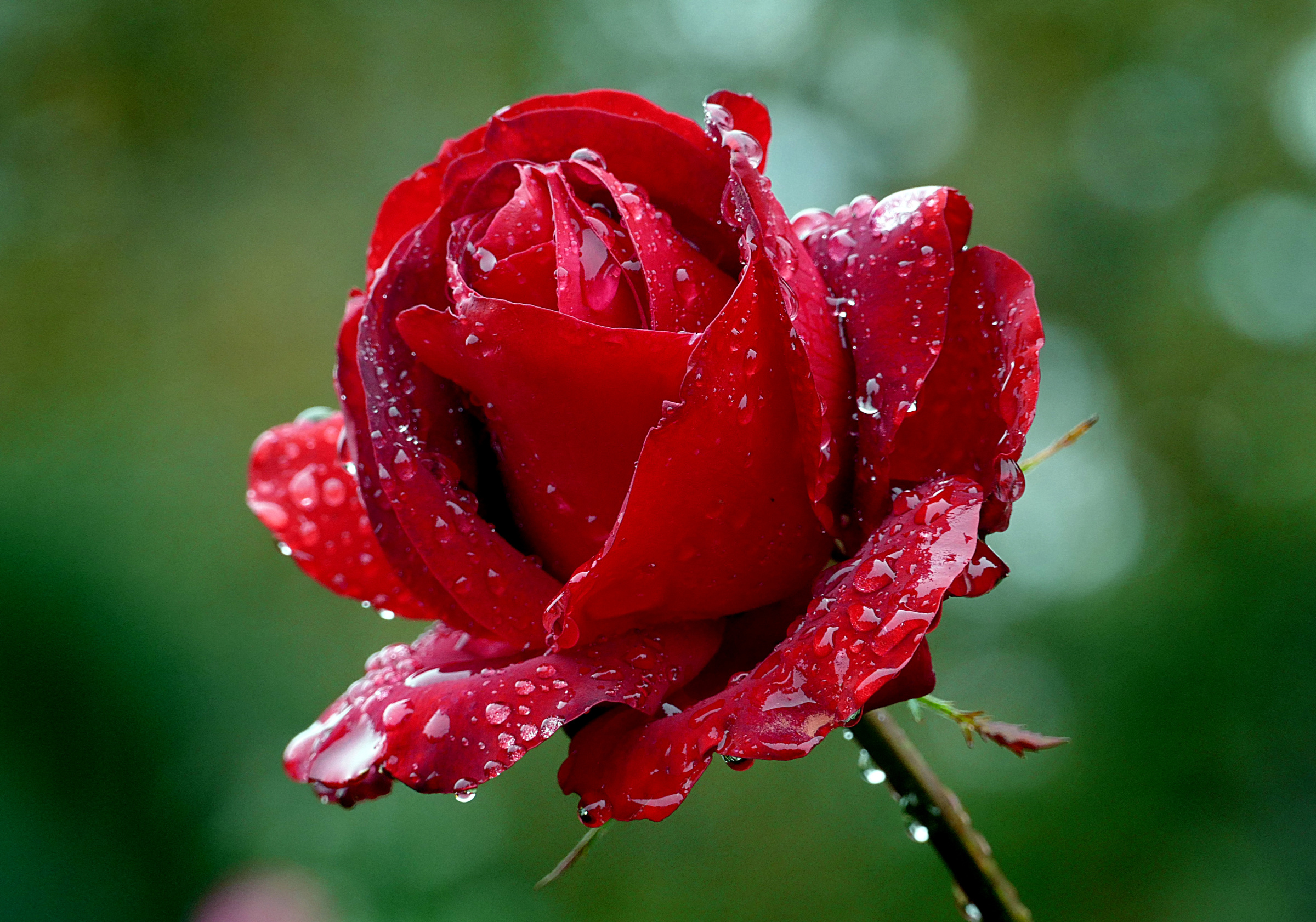
'Precious Platinum'

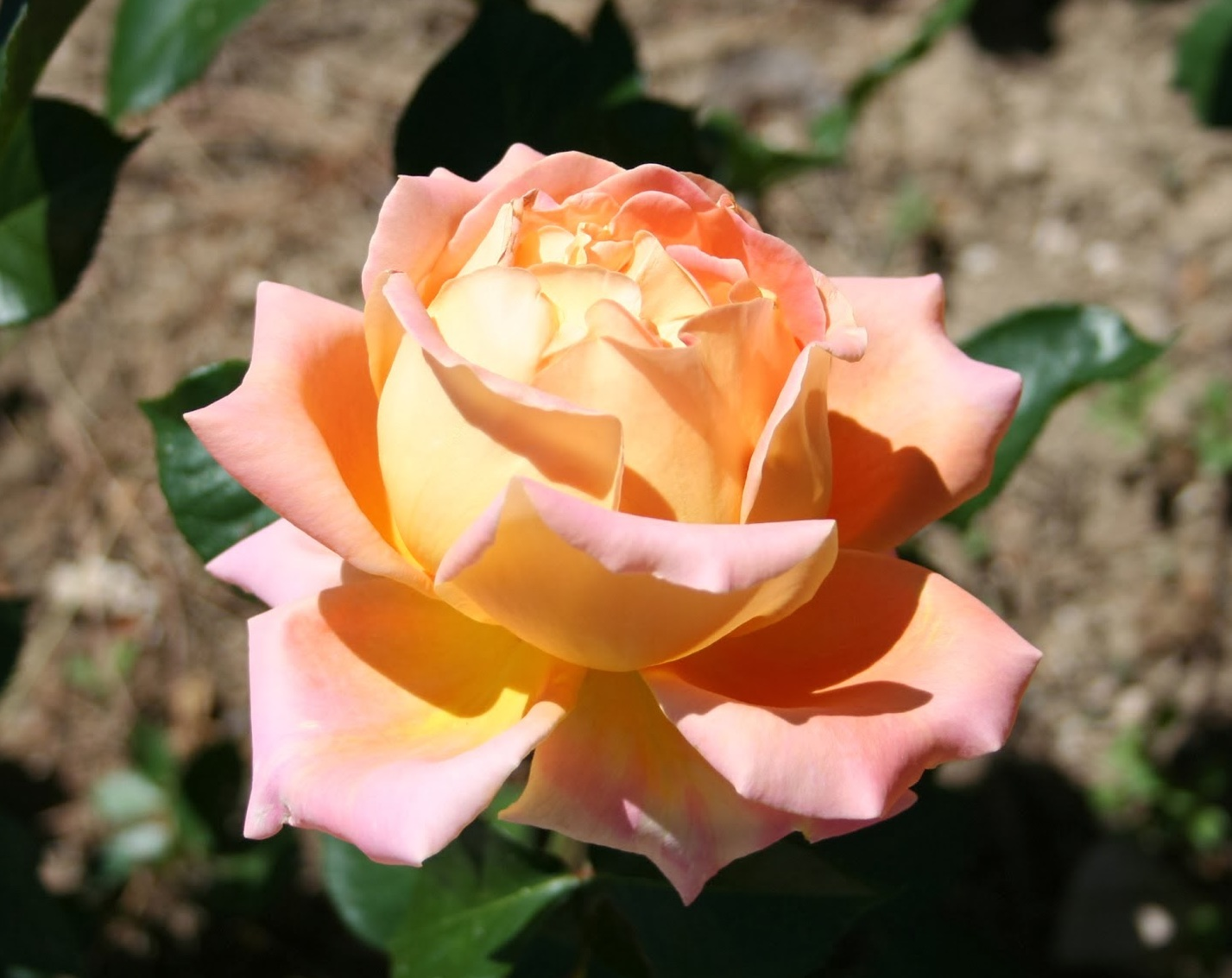
'Alpine Sunset'

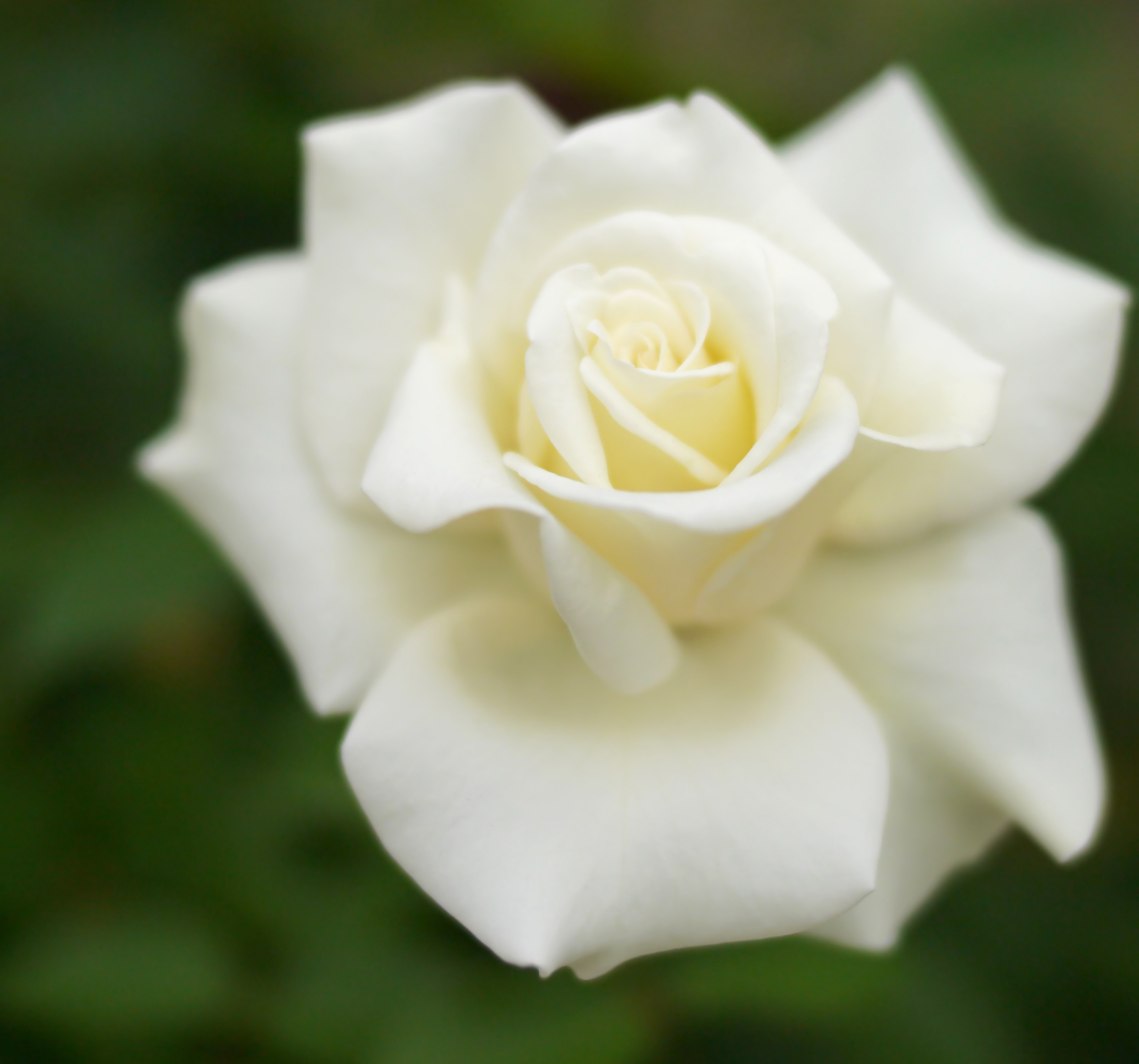
'John F. Kennedy'

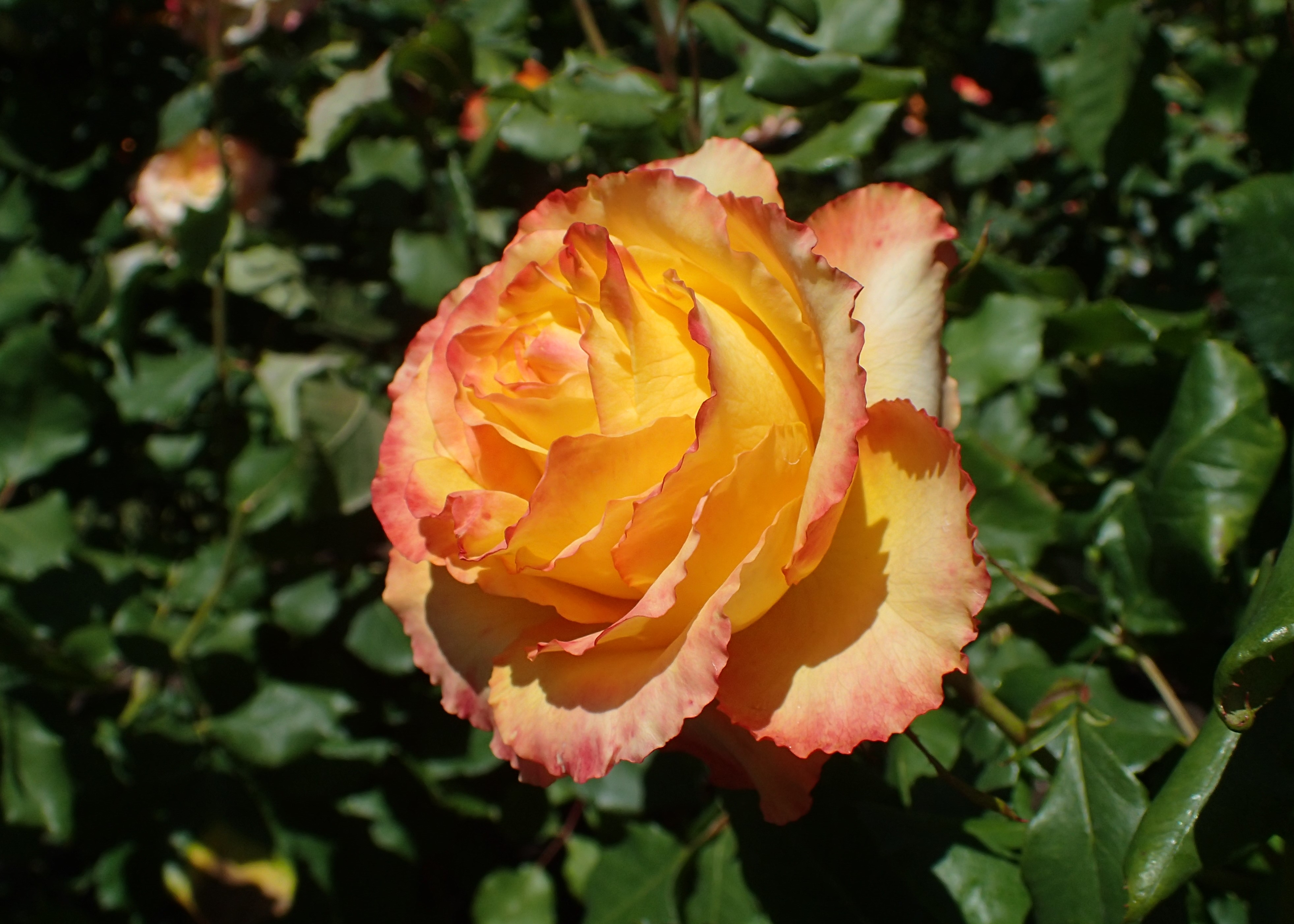
'Tequila Sunrise'

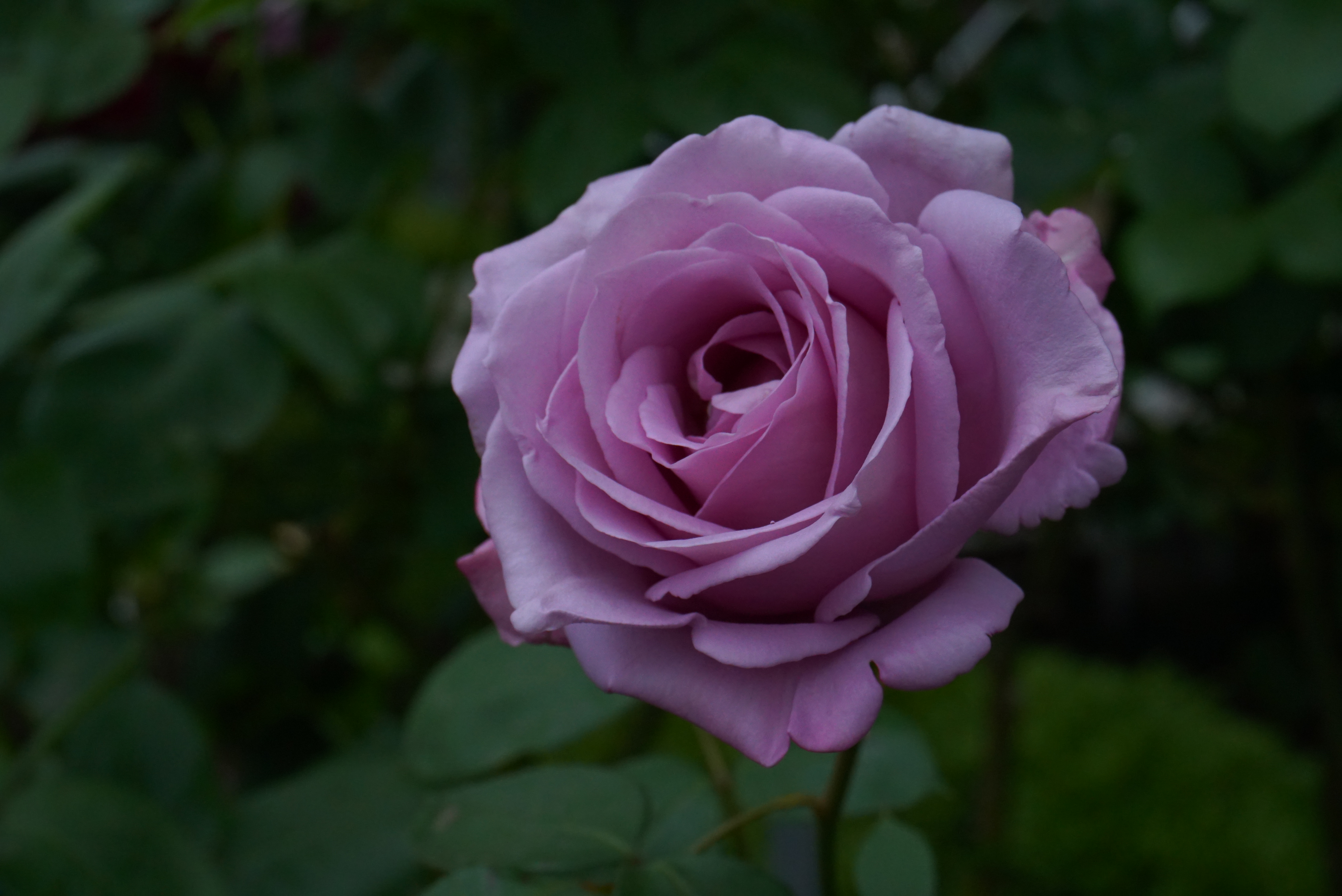
'Blue Moon'

'Charles de Gaulle'

== Sources ==
- Quest-Ritson, Brigid; Quest-Ritson, Charles (2003). Encyclopedia of Roses. DK Publishing. p. 222. ISBN 978-0756688684.
- Phillips, Roger; Rix, Martyn (1993). The Quest for the Rose. Random House. p. 113. ISBN 978-0-679-43573-0.
- Dickerson, Brent C. (2001). The Old Rose Advisor, Volume II Updated, Enlarged and Revised Second Edition (2nd ed.). Authors Choice Press. p. 206.
- Thomas, Graham Stuart (1994). The Graham Stuart Thomas Rose Book. Timber Press. ISBN 978-0881922806.
