= Alcanada =

Seaside area in Mallorca, Spain

The former ancient Muslim farmstead of Alcanada, is today known as a traditional summer holiday spot, with a beach without sand, a golf-course and a small island with a lighthouse. Alcanada, pronounced 'Aucanada' in Catalán, gave its name to the seaside area stretching from the Port d'Alcudia to the Cap de Menorca. The place name most likely came from Albecanata (Al-kaddan) – as it was known in the Llibre del Repartiment (Majorca) (1232).

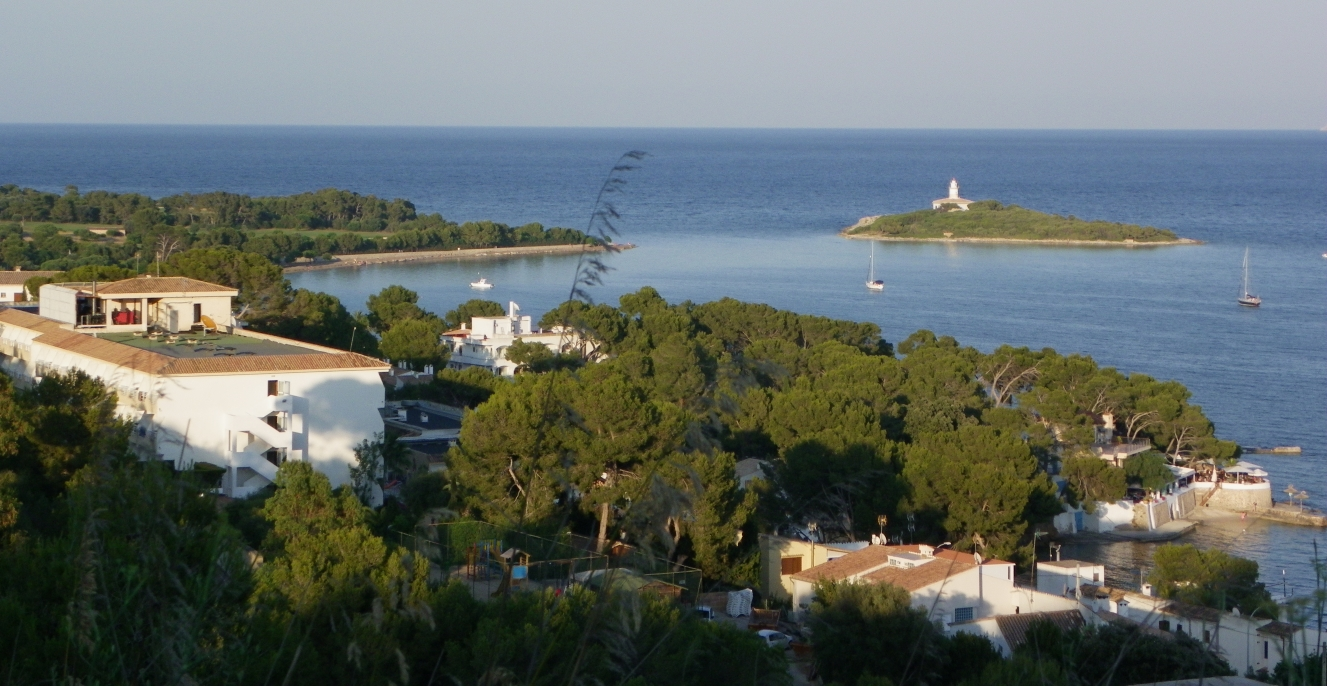
Alcanada's general view

== History ==
=== Alcanada's farmstead ===
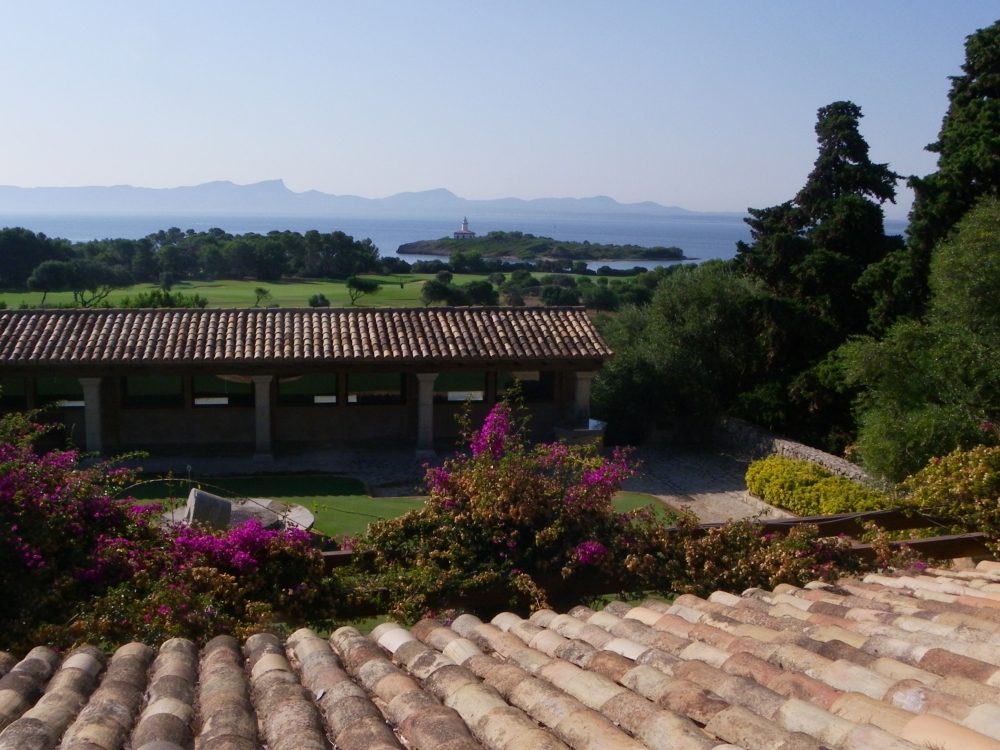
Alcanada's main houses

It appears that in the first centuries of our era there was a small Roman settlement in Alcanada's area, connected to the Roman city of Pollentia (Alcúdia) the ancient capital city of the Baleares Islands. Later on, during the Muslim rule of Mallorca (9th-13th centuries), the farmstead of Alcanada was established.

After the Balearic Islands were conquered by the Crown of Aragon, the farmstead ended up in the hands of Mr. Pere Ferrandiz, and as of the 14th century the land and the islet of Alcanada became communal property. Residents were allowed to graze their herds, collect firewood, harvest fan palm leaves, hunt, and gather snails. From the 16th century on, they were able to rent plots of farmland, known as rotes, in the communal property of Alcanada.

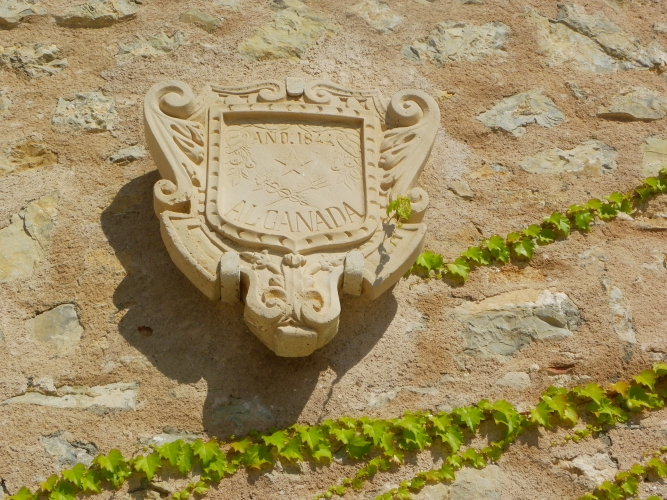
Alcanada's emblem

Martí Torrens, Guillem Torrens, and Antoni Fe were some of the owners of the main house of Alcanada. It included simple, two-story constructions that combined their agricultural functions with that of sheltering the workers of the estate. A document from the Municipal Archives of Alcúdia shows that in 1857 the house was inhabited by a family with three children, in addition to four shepherds and one servant. In the 1862 amullaramiento land tax records, the Alcanada estate is described as an area of 150 quarterades (106 hectares) with almond, carob, grain, olive, and fig crops, as well as vineyards, pine forest, and scrubland; its owner is listed as “D. Antonio Morey de Palma.”

From that same period, we have the description that the Archduke Ludwig Salvator of Austria included in his work Die Balearen:

“A path heads up from the Port of Alcúdia, first following the coast in the direction of the bay of Alcanada or Aucanada, and of the house of the same name with its underground spring from which a pump draws water leading to several watering troughs. A large vineyard lies at its feet, and the terraced fields on both sides are planted with carob and fig trees. Wild olive has spread into the nearby scrubland. The house is simple, with a tower and a terrace of paved stones with the shape of a star in the middle. An inscription on the well reads "Alcanada 1844."

Today, the main house and its adjoining outbuildings have been restored and adapted to their current use as a golf club and restaurant, although some of the spaces have been kept in their original form.

=== Sa Bassa Blanca ===
The estate known as Sa Bassa Blanca, by a stream with the same name, is located between the main house of the Alcanada estate and the Cap de Menorca. For its design, the Egyptian architect Hassan Fathy sought inspiration in the Muslim fortresses known as ribats, although he preserved the thick stone walls from the original farm building. The main entrance is through "el Camí de Muntanya" (The Mountain Road) and this road starts from Mal Pas area, no entrance by the sea.

Sa Bassa Blanca houses the headquarters of the Fundacion Yannick y Ben Jakober, and holds a heterogeneous series of art collections that are open to the public. The exhibition rooms located in the main building feature works involved in the art movements of the second half of the 20th century. The former water deposit houses the permanent collection, which includes over 150 portraits of children painted between the 16th and the 19th centuries. Most of the paintings show children from the European royalty or nobility.

=== Torre Major ===
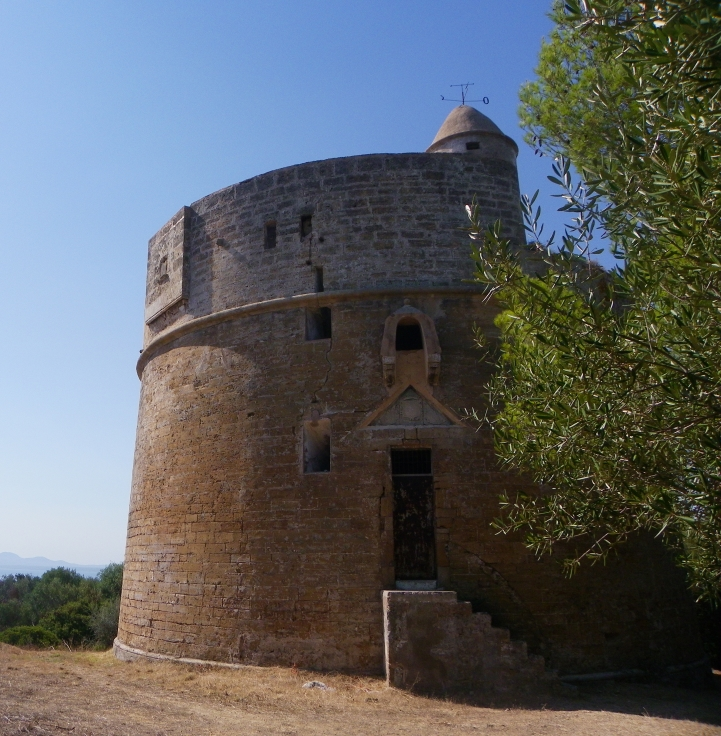
Torre Major

To fend off the pirate attacks, the mathematician and priest Joan Binimelis (1538-1616) devised a system of watchtowers along the Balearic coast with a code of signals that warned about the approach of pirate ships. The guards would light fires on the terraces of the towers, using smoke signals by day and fires by night, or even cannon shots, to warn the local population to prepare their defense.

The Torre Major marks the beginning of Alcanada. The name of the tower dates back to the times when the bay of Alcúdia was known as Port Major. The entrance is crowned with the coat of arms of King Philip III of Spain, carved in 1602 by the sculptor Antoni Verger.

Stretching from the Torre Major to the Penya Roja watchtower, almost nine kilometers of steep, barren coastline had to be watched and defended for hundreds of years–particularly beginning in the 16th century, when the Balearics were attacked by Berbers and pirates who plundered towns and houses and captured their inhabitants for ransom. The captives could spend years on end in North African lands, until they were eventually exchanged, sold, or their ransom was paid, sometimes collected from alms. There are chronicles of an attack on Cap del Pinar in 1551, when 25 Mallorcans were taken hostage and whose ransom of two thousand escudos was advanced by the University of Alcúdia.

=== The islet with the lighthouse ===
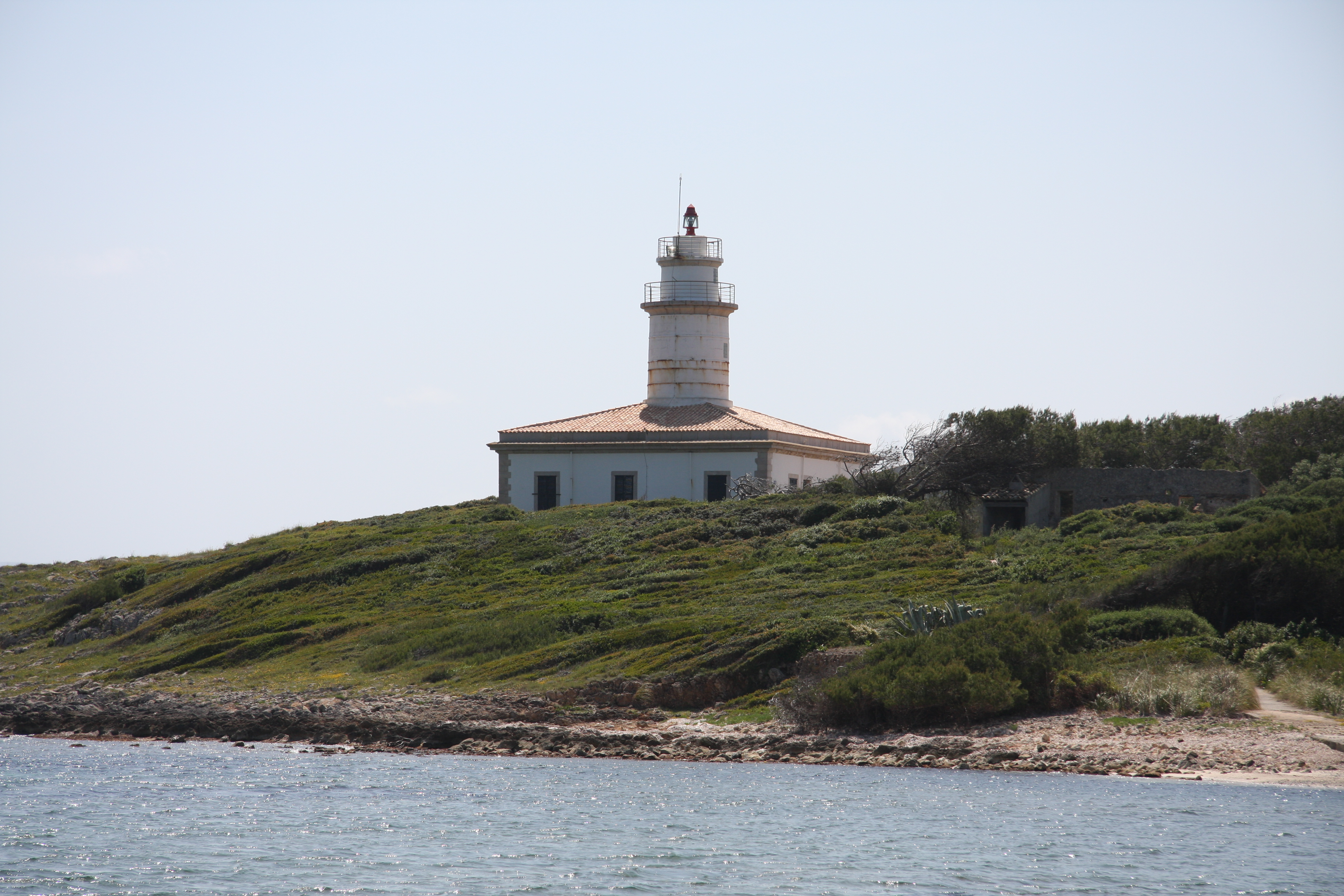
Lighthouse on an island near Alcanada

In the mid-19th century, the lighthouse was built. For one hundred years, the lighthouse keepers–sometimes with their families in tow–lived on the island, and there were times when they were actively involved in rescuing the victims of shipwrecks. Twice a week, a boat brought them supplies from the Port d'Alcudia, but at times they were isolated when ships were unable to sail due to bad weather, and their staples would run out.

During the Spanish Civil War (1936–39), the population increased when soldiers were posted to guard and defend the coastline with three machine gun nests that were built on the islet. Later on, in 1960, when the lantern system was automated, the islet was uninhabited again.

== The architectural intervention of Nicolau Mª Rubió i Tudurí ==
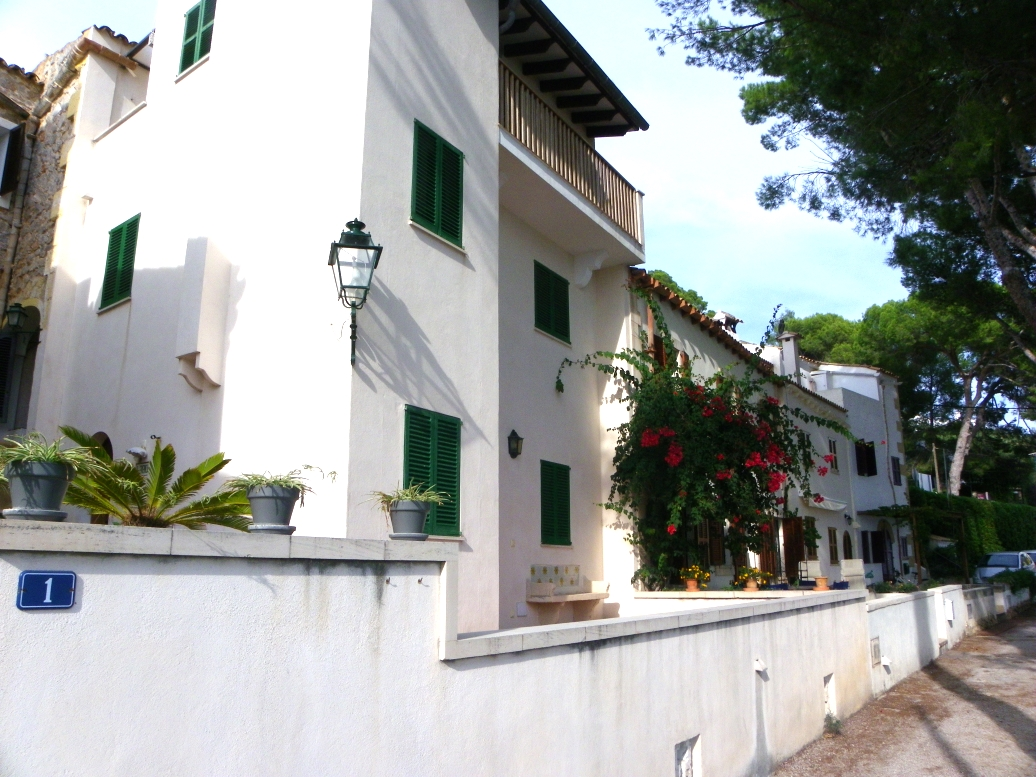
Summer holiday village by Rubió i Tudurí

In 1933, captivated by the gentle landscape of Alcanada, the Menorcan-born architect Nicolau M. Rubió i Tudurí (not surprisingly the director of the Municipal Institute for Parks and Gardens in Barcelona) designed a summer holiday village in this idyllic setting.

Rubió was drawn to the notion of garden cities and summer holiday resorts inspired by vernacular architecture, as promoted by the new architectural trends of the first third of the 20th century. Hence, his project for the development at Alcanada sought to emulate a fishermen's village, with its traditional shacks, narrow streets, and alleyways, even including an old quarter and a newer settlement. At the center of the development stood the Hotel del Sol, currently the Hotel President, which offered several rooms and a restaurant for the residents of the development

The horticulturalist and rose grower Pedro Dot, a good friend of Rubió, built the first house in the residential development. Right away, in just one year, forty other houses were built. Several years later, Pere Dot devoted the rose 'Perla de Alcanada' to this spot.

In addition to Rubió himself, the Sampol family–the owners of the Alcanada estate–were involved as the contractors for the development. The Spanish Civil War brought construction work to a halt; the project was left unfinished and in a semi-abandoned state for a decade. It took off again in the 1950, however, by then, the urban planning regulations allowed for buildings that deviated from Rubió's initial plan, thus distorting the project, with the exception of the original center.

The ensemble of houses nestled around Cala Ponçet has survived and preserves the atmosphere of a fishermen's village that turned into one of Alcanada's trademarks.
