= Jan Kraeck =

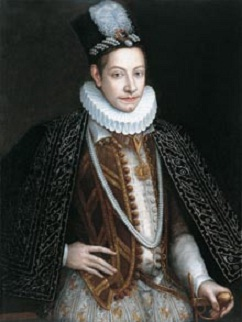
Charles Emmanuel I, Duke of Savoy by Kraek

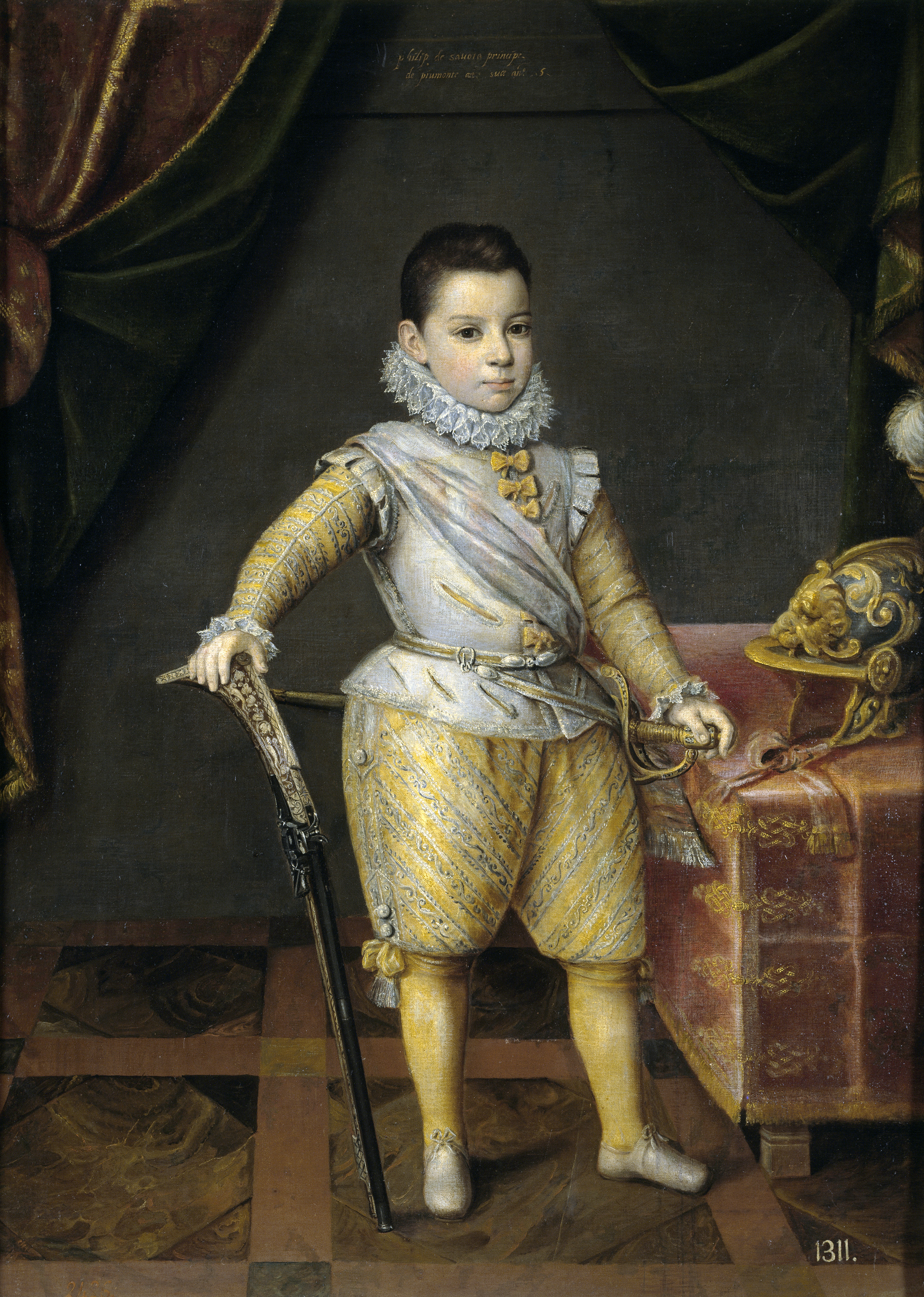
Philip Emmanuel of Savoy, age five (1591), oil on linen, 128 x 91 cm, Madrid, Museo del Prado

Jan Kraeck (1540, Haarlem – 1607, Turin, Italian: Giovanni Caracca), was a Dutch Renaissance painter who established his career in Italy, in the royal court of the House of Savoy in Turin.

== Biography ==
According to Karel van Mander he was visited by Hendrik Cornelisz Vroom in 1585 in Turin.

According to the RKD he was the father-in-law of the painter-architect Friedrich Sustris and became court painter to Emanuel Philibert, duc de Savoie and after the duke died in 1580, to the duke's successor Charles Emanuel I.

== Works ==
- The Holy Family (1568–1578), Sabauda Gallery
- Three armoured men in prayer in front of the Holy Virgin and Child (1568–1585), Sabauda Gallery
- Portrait of Charles Emmanuel I of Savoy (1580), Fundacion Yannick y Ben Jakober
- Portrait of Philip Emmanuel of Savoy, five years old (1591), Museo del Prado
- Victor Amadeus I, Emmanuel Philibert and Philip Emmanuel of Savoy (1593–1594), Fundacion Yannick y Ben Jakober
- Portrait of Philip Emmanuel of Savoy (c. 1603, attributed), Fundacion Yannick y Ben Jakober

== Bibliography ==
- Astrua Paola, Bava Anna Maria, Spantigati Carla Enrica, Il nostro pittore fiamengo (Our Flemish Painters), Giovanni Carraca alla corte dei Savoia (1568–1607), Turin, Umberto Allemandi & C, 1955, 2002 and 2006 editions. (ISBN 978-88-422-1371-0)
