= Pedro Dot rose list =

This is a list of the extant roses of the Spanish breeder Pedro Dot (1885–1976). ‘HT’ means ‘hybrid tea.’

== Sortable list of available Pedro Dot roses ==
Name	Date	Type	Colour	Extant	Photo
Angel Guimerà	1926	HT	Amber, yellow centre	Yes	
Angelis	1960	HT	White	Unknown	
Angelita Ruaix	1940	HT	Orange-yellow	Yes	
Angels Mateu	1934	HT	Pink, salmon and gold shading	Yes	
Anny	1949	Miniature	White	Yes	
Apeles Mestres	1931	Climbing hybrid Pernetiana	Golden yellow	Yes	
Aracelei Leyva	1940	HT	Orange-pink	Yes	
Aribau	1936	HT	Red	Yes	
Aurea	1948	HT	Yellow, red reverse	Yes	
Aurelia Capdevila	1933	HT	Salmon pink	Yes	
Aurora de España	1966	HT	Salmon pink	Yes	
Baby Gold Star	1940	Miniature	Deep Yellow	Yes	
Bambino	1953	Miniature	Pink	No	
Blanc Dot	1962	HT	White	Yes	
Bois de Long	1972	HT	Red	Yes	
Canarias	1964	HT	Red	Yes	
Canigó	1927	HT	White	Yes	
Carito MacMahon	1934	HT	Yellow	Yes	
Carles Fargas	1935	HT	Orange	Yes	
Carmen Sistachs	1936	Polyantha	Pink and yellow	Unknown	
Carmen Talón	1953	HT	Dark red	Yes	
Cascabel	1957	Floribunda	Red Blend	Yes	
Catalònia	1931	HT/Ch/Pernetiana	Orange red	Yes	
Cayetana Stuart	1930	HT	Yellow, amber centre	Yes	
Centro de Lectura	1959	HT	Red	Yes	
Clementina	1961	HT	White and pink	Yes	
Colette Berges	1940	HT	Crimson	Yes	
Condesa de Mayalde	1956	HT	White, fuchsia edges	Yes	
Condesa de Sástago	1932	HT	Pink Blend	Yes	
Congratulations	1970	HT	Mauve	Yes	
Coralin	1931	Climbing HT	Coral red	Yes	
Costa Dortata	1970	HT	Red	Yes	
Diputació de Tarragona	1967	HT	Orange blend	Yes	
Director Rubió	1929	HT	Fuchsia	Yes	
Dr Fleming	1960	HT	Pink blend	Yes	
Duquesa de Peñaranda	1931	HT/Ch/Pernetiana	Salmon-orange	Yes	
Edouard Renard	1933	HT	Carmine red	Yes	
Eduardo Toda	1947	HT	Yellow	Unknown	
Enric Palau	nd	HT	Mauve	Yes	
Escultor Clará	1956	HT	Mauve	Yes	
Eugenio Fojo	1953	Hybrid Pernetiana	Vermillion	Unknown	
Eulalia Regordosa	1926	Hybrid Pernetiana	Unknown	Unknown	
F. Cambó	1930	HT	Red	Unknown	
Fama	1942	HT	Red blend	Unknown	
Federico Casas	1932	HT	Orange and yellow	Yes	
Fiesta Brava	1959	Miniature	Geranium red	Yes	
Floricel	1957	HT	Red orange	Yes	
Francesc Mateu	1940	HT	Unknown	Unknown	
Francisco Curbera	1923	HT	Salmon-pink	Yes	
Friné	1961	HT	Dark red	Unknown	
Frivolité	1956	HT	Orange-red	Yes	
Gamusin	1960	HT	Russet	Yes	
Gaudí	1969	HT	Yellow and pink	Yes	
Giovane	1965	HT	Orange-pink	Yes	
Girasol	1945	HT	Yellow	Unknown	
Girona	1936	HT	Red and yellow	Yes	
Gladiador	1954	Climbing HT	Deep pink	Unknown	
Godfrey Winn (Milagros de Fontcuberta)	1968	HT	Mauve	Yes	
Golden Moss	1932	Moss	Yellow	Yes	
Golden Sástago	1938	HT	Golden yellow	Yes	
Granadina	1956	Miniature	Red	Yes	
Granate	1947	Miniature	Dark red	Yes	
Heraldo	1949	Climbing HT	Mauve	Unknown	
Hermelia Casas	1956	Floribunda	Pink	Unknown	
Hermen Anglada	1933	HT	White	Unknown	
Hong Kong	1962	HT	Yellow and red	Yes	
Horticultor Vidal	1952	HT	Salmon-pink	Unknown	
Ibiza	1938	HT	White	Yes	
Ignasi Iglesias	1932	HT	Red	Unknown	
Inca de Mallorca	1958	floribunda	Red	Unknown	
Isabel Llorach	1929	Hybrid Pernetiana	Deep yellow, red flecks	Yes	
Jardinero Ortíz	1969	HT	Red	Yes	
Josefina de Salgado	1963	HT	Deep pink	Yes	
Joaquin Mir	1942	HT	Bright yellow	Yes	
Jours heureux	1968	Floribunda	Pink	Yes	
La Giralda	1926	HT	Pink	Yes	
Lady Trent = Julia Ferran	1940	HT	Orange blend	Yes	
Leotilde Márquez	1961	HT	Unknown	Unknown	
Li Burés	1927	HT	Rose-red and Yellow	Yes	
Lila Tan	1961	HT	Mauve	Unknown	
Linda Porter = Miguel Aldrufeu	1957	HT	Medium Pink	Yes	
Lleida	1936	HT	Red blend	Yes	
Lola Montes	1968	HT	Orange	Yes	
Loli Creus	1953	HT	Deep pink	Yes	
Lucia Zuloaga	1932	HT	Unknown	Unknown	
Luis Briñas	1932	HT	Orange blend	Yes	
Luisa Fernanda da Silva	1946	HT	Red blend	Yes	
Mabel Dot	1966	Miniature	Orange-red	Yes	
Madame Fojo	1937	HT	Orange blend	Unknown	
Madame Grégoire Staechelin	1927	Large Flowered Climber	Pink Blend	Yes	
Magadalena Nubiola	1932	HT	Orange-pink	Unknown	
Magrana	1954	HT	Orange-red	Yes	
Mallorca	1938	HT	Scarlet	Yes	
Manuelita	1947	HT	Orange-red	Unknown	
Marfil	1962	HT	Unknown	Unknown	
Margarita Riera	1924	HT	Salmon pink, yellow undertones	Unknown	
Marí Dot	1927	HT	Apricot blend	Yes	
Maria Chavarri de Salazar	1935	HT	White, pink shading, peach reverse	Yes	
Maria Guarro	1935	HT	Deep pink	Unknown	
Maria Peral	1941	HT	Yellow and red	Yes	
Marilyn	1952	Miniature	Pink	Yes	
Marina Fontcuberta	1924	HT	Carmine-pink	Unknown	
Marquesa de Casa Valdés	1954	HT	Orange-rred	Yes	
Marquesa de Goicoerrotea	1947	HT	Apricot	Yes	
Marquesa de Vadillo	1945	HT	Pink blend	Yes	
Marta Casals	1975	HT	Pink	Yes	
Mayet	1951	HT	Red	Unknown	
Mediterránea	1943	HT	Unknown	Unknown	
Menut	1956	Miniature	Deep pink	Unknown	
Mercedes Mendoza	1962	HT	Orange	Yes	
Miquel Andrufeu = Linda Porter	1957	Unknown	Unknown	Unknown	
Mon Petit	1947	Miniature	Dark Pink	Yes	
Montijo	1954	Floribunda	Crimson	Yes	
Montseny	1944	HT	Salmon-pink	Yes	
Nevada	1927	Hybrid Spinosissima	White	Yes	
Nivea	1949	HT	White blend	Yes	
Nuria de Recolons	1933	HT	White	Yes	
O. Junyent	1924	HT	Coral-red	Unknown	
Ocaso	1957	Floribunda	Red	Yes	
Orange Dot	1963	HT	Orange	Yes	
Orient	1959	HT	Dark red	Unknown	
Padre Mañanet	1957	HT	Dark red	Yes	
Paloma Falcó	1930	HT	Coral, salmon shading	Unknown	
Para Ti	1946	Miniature	White	Yes	
Pardiñas Bonet	1931	HT	Deep yellow, red reverse	Yes	
Pedro Veyrat	1933	HT	Apricot	Yes	
Perla de Alcanada	1944	Miniature	Light Red	Yes	
Perla de Alcanada Climbing	1944>	Climbing Miniature	Light Red	Yes	
Perla de Montserrat	1945	Miniature	Pink Blend	Yes	
Perla Rosa	1946	Miniature	Medium Pink	Yes	
Perla Rosa climbing	1947	Climbing Miniature	Medium pink	Yes	
Pilar Dot	1964	Miniature	Orange–pink	Yes	
Pilarin Vilella	1936	HT	Orange–red	Yes	
Pixie Gold	1961	Miniature	Medium Yellow	Yes	
Pollentia	1942	HT	Deep pink	Yes	
Presumida	1948	Miniature	Unknown	Unknown	
Ràdio	1937	HT	Yellow with pink stripes	Yes	
Rafaela G. de Peña	1938	HT	Orange blend	Unknown	
Ramon Bach	1938	HT	Orange, golden reverse	Yes	
Regina Pacis	1945	HT	Unknown	Unknown	
Reus	1949	HT	Mauve	Yes	
Riviera	1939	HT	Orange-red	Yes	
Robin	1956	Miniature	Red	Yes	
Román	1961	HT	Pink	Unknown	
Rosa d'Abril	1948	HT	Carmine-red	Yes	
Rosa de Friera	1956	HT	Pink blend	Unknown	
Rosa Gallart	1935	HT	Pink	Yes	
Rosada	1953	Miniature	Orange-pink	Yes	
Rose Dot	1962	HT	Red Blend	Yes	
Rosella	1931	Hybrid Pernetiana	Pink and yellow	Unknown	
Rosiériste Gaston Léveque	1932	HT	Deep pink	Yes	
Rosina	1951	Miniature	Yellow	Yes	
Rosmari	1962	HT	Pink blend	Yes	
Rouge Dot	1962	HT	Red	Yes	
Rubor	1947	HT	Pink	Unknown	
Satmir	1956	HT	Dark red	Yes	
Senateur Potié	1937	HT	Orange blend	Yes	
Señora de Gari	1934	HT	Deep yellow	Unknown	
Si	1957	Microminiatura	White	Yes	
Silvia Leyva	1933	HT	Geranium-red	Yes	
Sirena	1939	HT	Unknown	Unknown	
Snow White	1938	HT	White	Unknown	
Soir d'Automne	1966	HT	Mauve	Yes	
Sóller	1949	HT	Yellow	Yes	
Stel	1975	Unknown	Unknown	Unknown	
Sunrise	1939	HT	Unknown	Unknown	
Super Aribau	1960	HT	Unknown	Unknown	
Super Gamusin	1962	HT	Russet	Yes	
Susana Marchal	1953	HT	Coral-red	Unknown	
Susane Dot	1963	Climber	Dark red	Yes	
Sylvia Dot	1965	Floribunda	Light pink	unknown	
Tanger	1949	HT	Red-white bicolour	Yes	
Tarragona	1945	HT	Apricot	Unknown	
Valdemosa	1956	Floribunda	Red	Unknown	
Vidiago	1962	HT	Red	Unknown	
Vigoro	1953	HT	Pink Blend	Yes	
Virgen de Farnés	1960	HT	Pink	Yes	
Viuda Verdaguer	1934	HT	Orange blend	Unknown	
