= Pedro Dot =

Spanish rose breeder

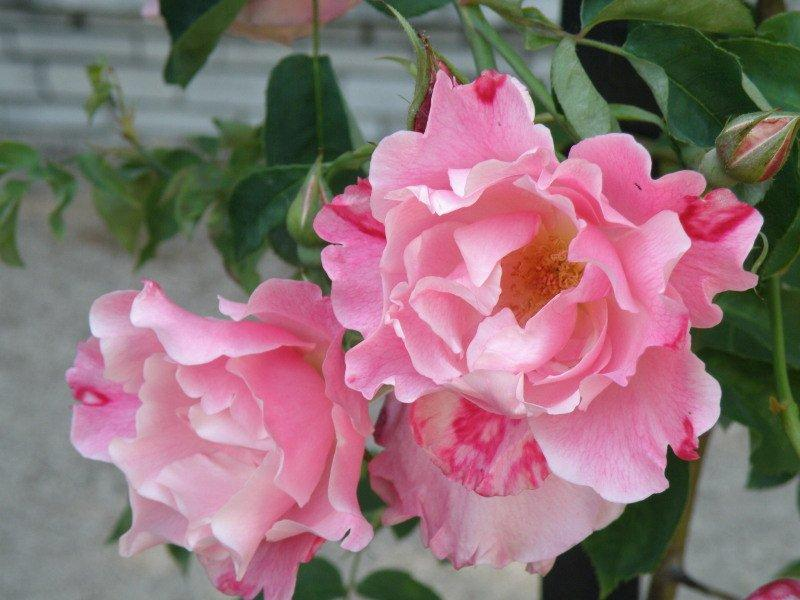
Climbing to 6 metres, 'Madame Grégoire Staechelin' of 1927 smells of sweet peas.

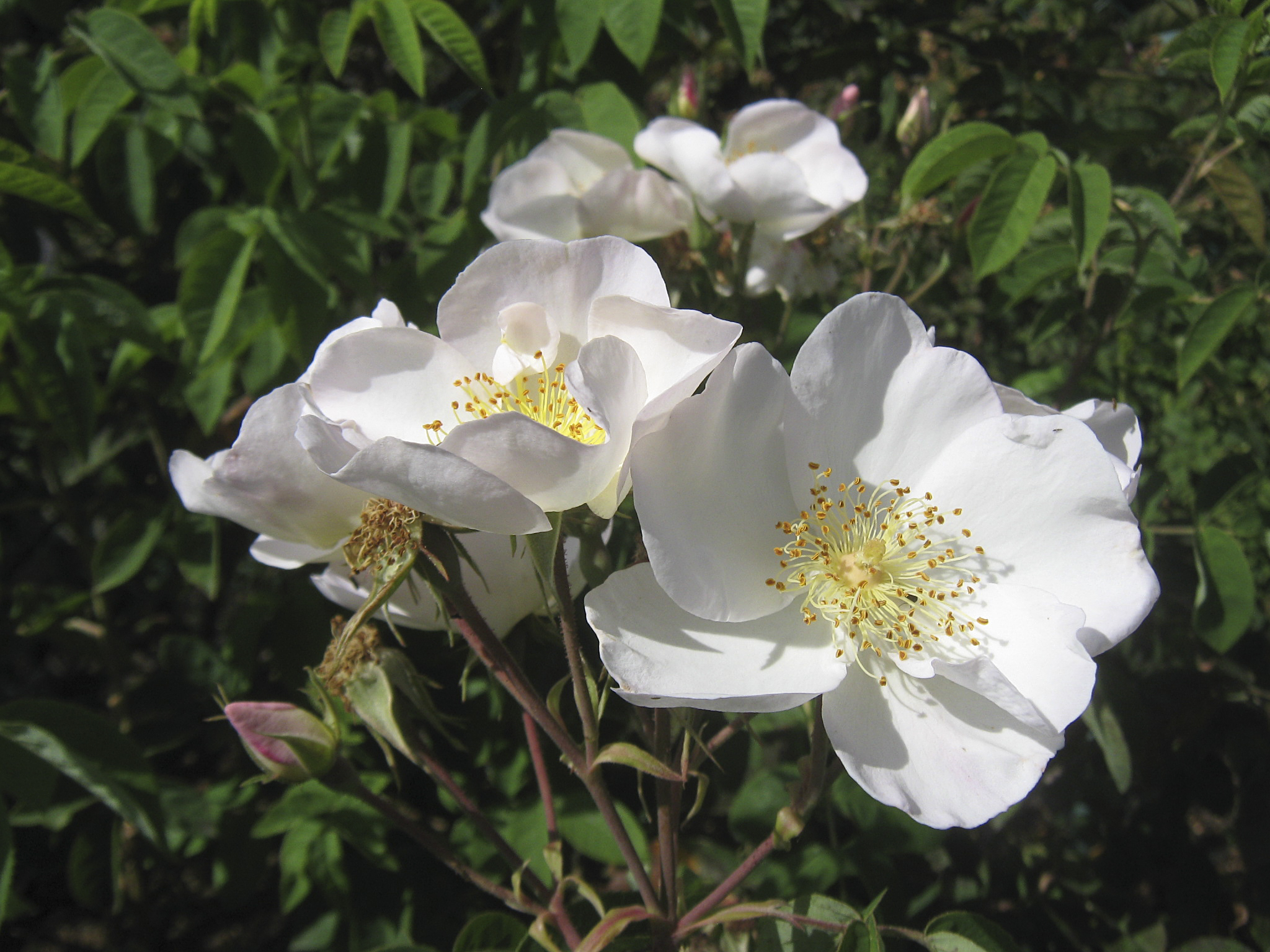
Pedro Dot's 'Nevada' of 1927. The 10 cm flowers can blush pink in hot weather. Nevada is Spanish for snow.

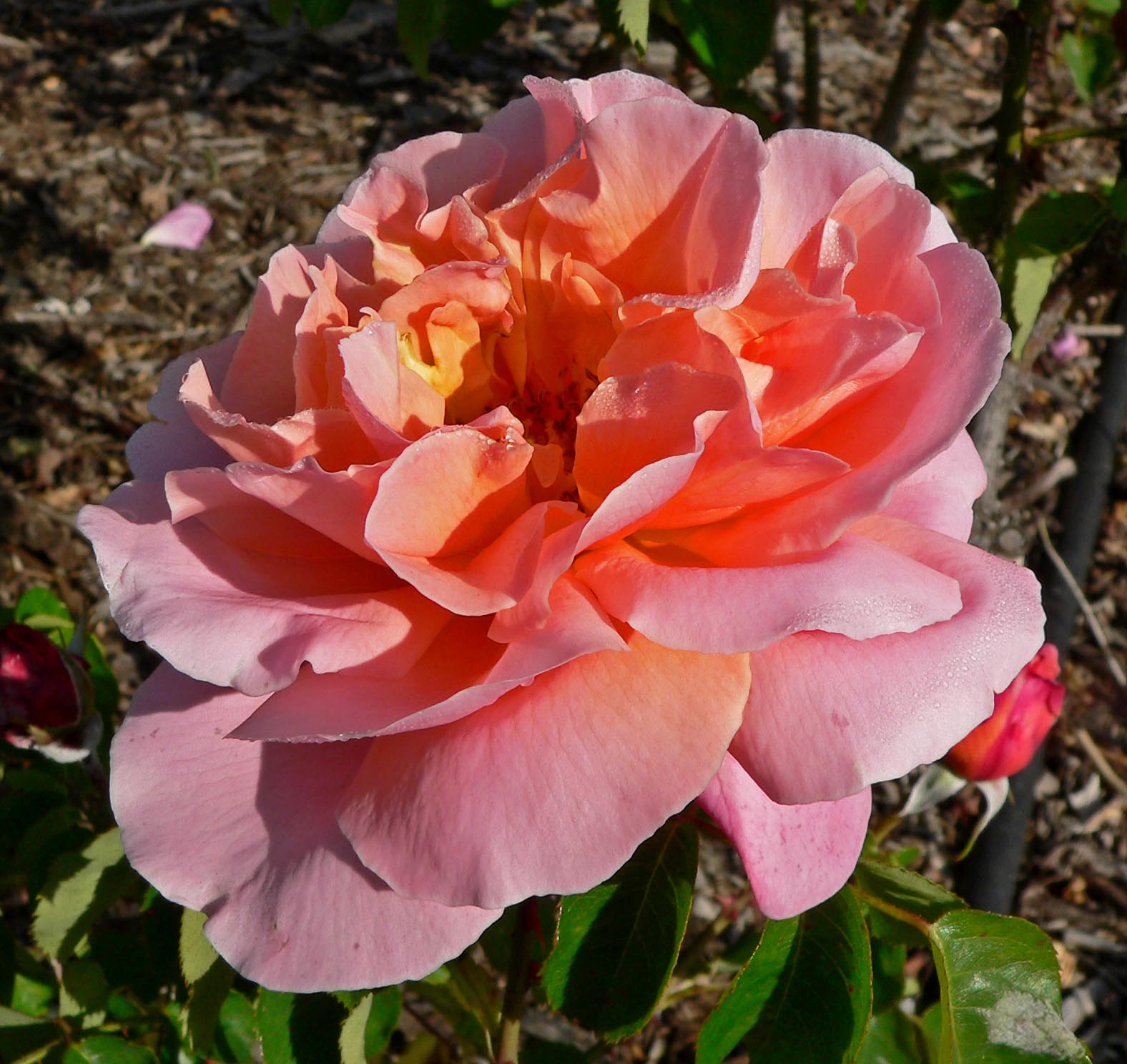
'Marí Dot' of 1927. Rich fruit scent. "The epitome of the Pedro Dot rose." Marí is Catalan for Marino, Dot's second son.

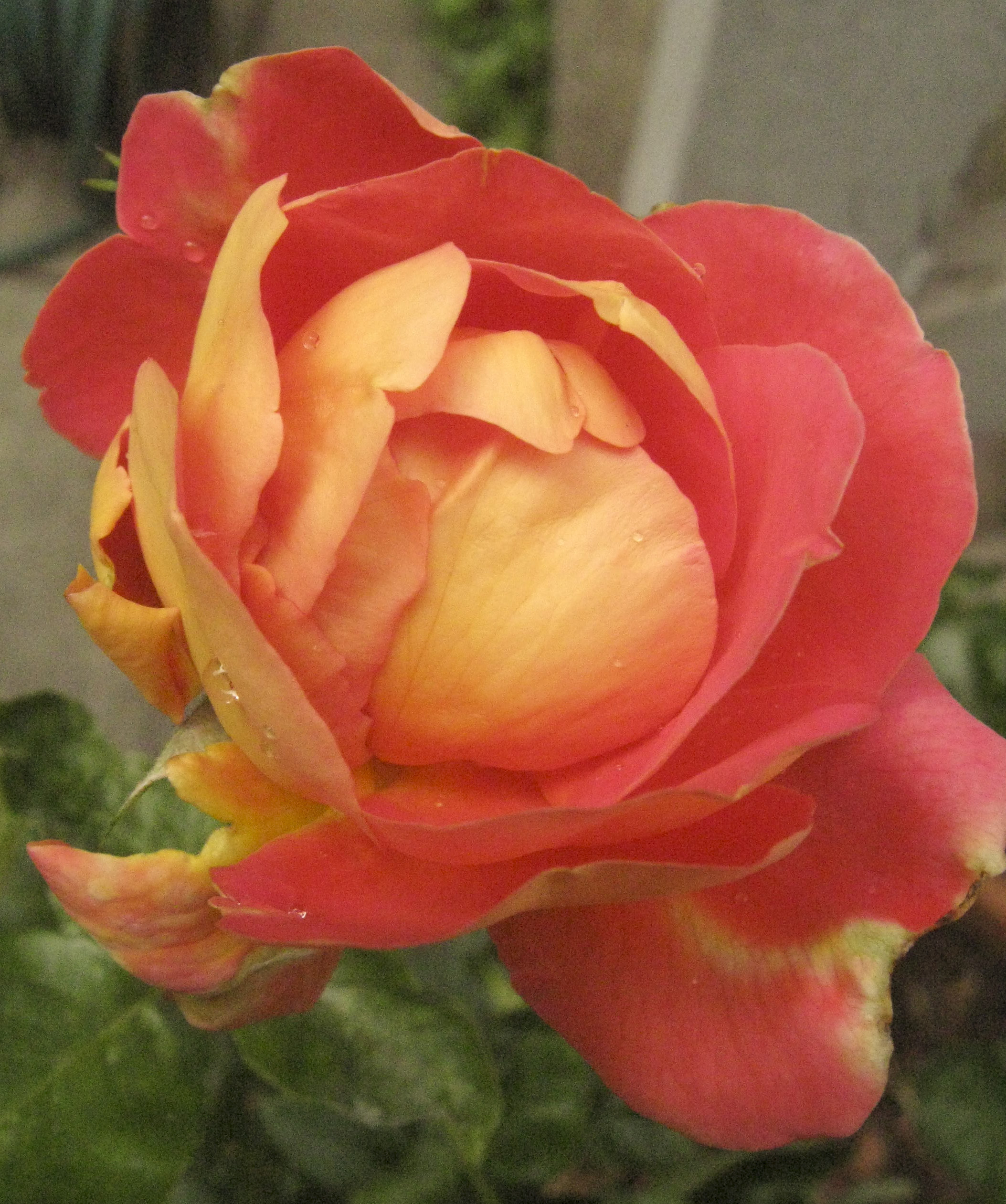
'Condesa de Sástago' of 1930. The first well known bicolor rose and one of Dot's great successes. Very recurrent. Scented of apples and cinnamon.

Pedro Dot (1885–1976) was a Spanish rose breeder.

== Biography ==
Pedro Dot (in Catalan, Pere Dot i Martínez) was born on 28 March 1885 outside Barcelona on the rose-growing Monistrol estate (now better known for sparkling wine) where his father was estate manager. His early experiments in hybridising roses were encouraged by the Marquise of Monistrol, also titled Countess of Sástago. The countess lent him money to get started, eventually repaid by dedication of one of his finest roses. His father Simon, born into a peasant family but a notable gardener and plant breeder, started a small nursery nearby at San Feliu de Llobregat, where the soil is very alkaline and where the family firm of Rosas Dot is still to be found. Pedro took charge of the roses and later the whole firm. Eventually he moved to Vilafranca del Penedés on the other side of Barcelona, but retained San Feliu de Llobregat. At sixteen he was sent to work at an outside business and in 1910 to Belgium and Paris, where he came across the new methods of hybridisation, not to mention the French attitude to garden art. To escape the small stage of Spanish horticulture, he subsequently played to a world audience.

As early as 1924, Pedro entered new roses in scores of international competitions, winning a certificate of merit at the Bagatelle trials in Paris with the variety ‘Margarita Riera.’ He used such choice varieties as ‘Frau Karl Druschki,’ ‘Souvenir de Claudius Pernet,’ and ‘Mme Edouard Herriot’ to produce a large number of brightly coloured hybrid tea roses that all performed well in hot climates. They mostly have Pernetiana ancestry – Pernet was the first to breed the intense yellow colour and strong smell of Rosa foetida into hybrid tea roses – and are not frost hardy. ‘Marí Dot’ won a prize in Strasbourg and ‘Condesa de Sástago’ the first Rome Prize; later it became very popular in the United States. It was the first successful bicolor rose, with petals scarlet on the front, golden yellow on the back. Conard-Pyle imported many of these roses into the United States under their original names, but only a few seem to have been patented. From 1925 Dot also began to use the pollen of wild roses in his breeding.

Undoubtedly, Dot’s most successful rose (a hybrid spinosissima) was ‘Nevada,’ released in 1927. The great climber ‘Mme Grégoire Staechelin’ came out in the same year. Given that a breeder often has scores of seedlings to choose from, Dot consistently chose roses with a wilder and more extreme character than their parents'. In that way he has something of the expressionism of his fellow Catalan, Gaudí. Dot also renewed the tradition of moss roses with 'Golden Moss' (1932), the first yellow moss ever bred.

Throughout the 1930s Dot successfully built on the work of Joseph Pernet-Ducher to produce a range of flame-colored roses, from pastel to hot orange blends. Examples include ‘Catalònia’, ‘Condesa de Sástago’, ‘Angels Mateu’, ‘Girona’, ‘Maria Peral’, ‘Duquesa de Peñaranda’ and ‘Federico Casas’. With ‘Baby Gold Star’, ‘Golden Sástago’, and ‘Joaquin Mir’, Dot achieved true, deep yellows.

He was a member of the Amigos de las Rosas, founded in Barcelona in 1931 with Rubio, Cambo, Ros Sabaté, and Cyprien Camprubí, hybridiser of the well-known 'Violonista Costa.' His pupil Eugenio Fojo became well known in northern Spain.

Dot was supported during the Civil War by commissions from the Republican government of Barcelona and by regular funds from Conard-Pyle and American rosarians. Though his sons Simon and Marí fought at the front for the losing Republicans, the business was partly shielded from Nationalist victory by American money and support. During the Civil War and for twenty years after it, Dot hybridised miniature roses, revolutionising the field. His genetic theory was to cross hybrid teas and miniatures, thus better improving the form than hybridisers who used polyanthas.

Pedro Dot was the most famous Spanish rose breeder, but in the 1960s his son Simon became a breeder himself, particularly of mauve and lavender roses. Pedro’s other son Marino and his two grandsons all released roses in the 1960s and 1970s. Because of Pedro’s fame, some of their roses have been wrongly attributed to him.

Pedro Dot died at 91 on 12 November 1976.

== Rose names and dedications ==
Until the Second World War it would have been true to say that the name of every Dot rose was also its dedication. In the 1920s these are mostly to family members ('Marí Dot') and aristocratic patrons ('Cayetana Stuart'). In the Republican period they are to Catalan patriots ('Angel Guimera') and Republican towns not yet taken by the Nationalists ('Lleida,' 'Girona'); later to international supporters ('Sénateur Potié') and Catalan patriots ('Ramon Bach') killed in the war. After the Second World War, alas, they decline generally speaking into tributes to international celebrities and tourist locales.

== The survival of Dot's work ==
'Nevada' and 'Mme Grégoire Staechelin' will certainly survive. Dot's miniatures are safe with their aficionados. The problem lies with Dot's wonderful hybrid teas. His firm continues in business and it offers about 60 roses for sale, but only ten by Pedro himself. Vintage Gardens nursery in California had a score for sale in a State where they do well. A handful survive in European public gardens, notably the Roseraie de L'Haÿ near Paris and the Roseraie François Mitterrand in the south of France. Luckily there are 66 in the encyclopaedic collection of Fineschi in Italy and 32 extra at Sangerhausen in Germany. But many of Dot's 140 or so hybrid teas — among the greatest oeuvres in roses — hang by a thread from private collectors in Spain. The beautiful 'Angelita Ruaix' for instance is preserved by her elderly daughter on a balcony in Barcelona.

Australian collections contain at least the floribunda ‘Cascabel,’ ‘Catalònia,’ ‘Condesa de Sástago,’ ‘Duquesa de Peñeranda,’ 'Frivolité,' ‘Girona,’ ‘Golden Moss,’ ‘Lady Trent’ ('Julia Ferran'), ‘Linda Porter’ (‘Miguel Andrufeu’), ‘Lola Montes,’ ‘Mme Grégoire Staechelin,’ ‘Nevada,’ ‘Pilarin Vilella’ and ‘Rádio.’ There are also many miniatures.

== See also ==
- Pedro Dot rose list

== Family photos of Pedro Dot ==
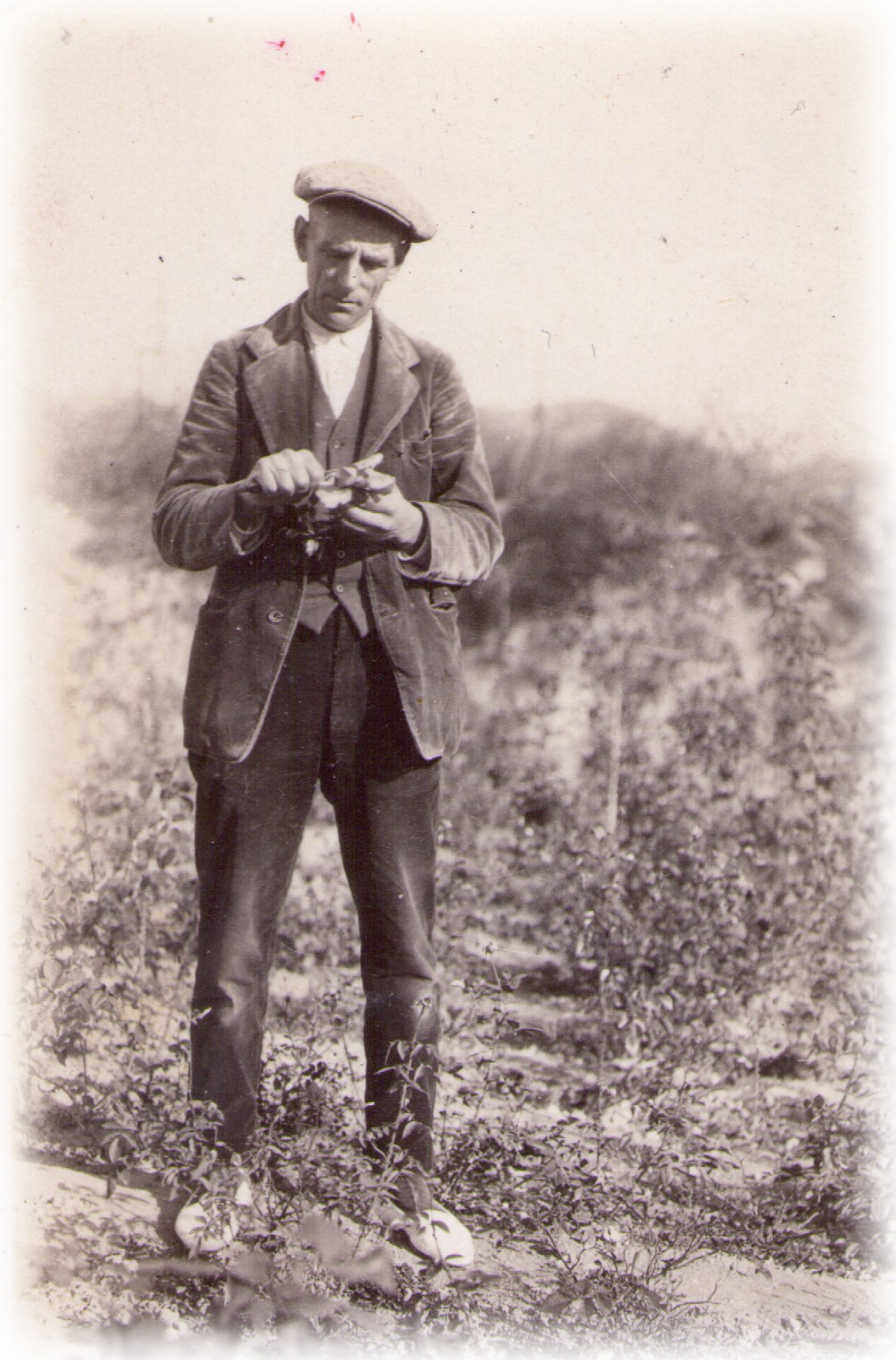
Pedro Dot in his rose fields in the 1930s.

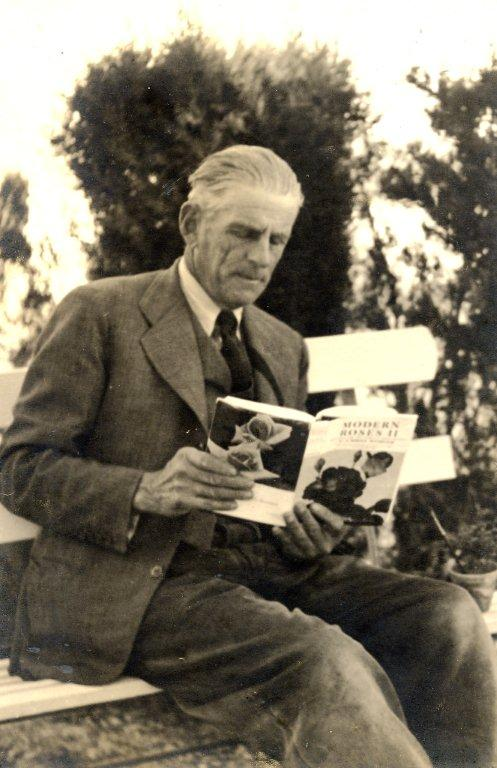
Pedro Dot on the terrace of his house Sol i Vent reading Modern Roses 11.

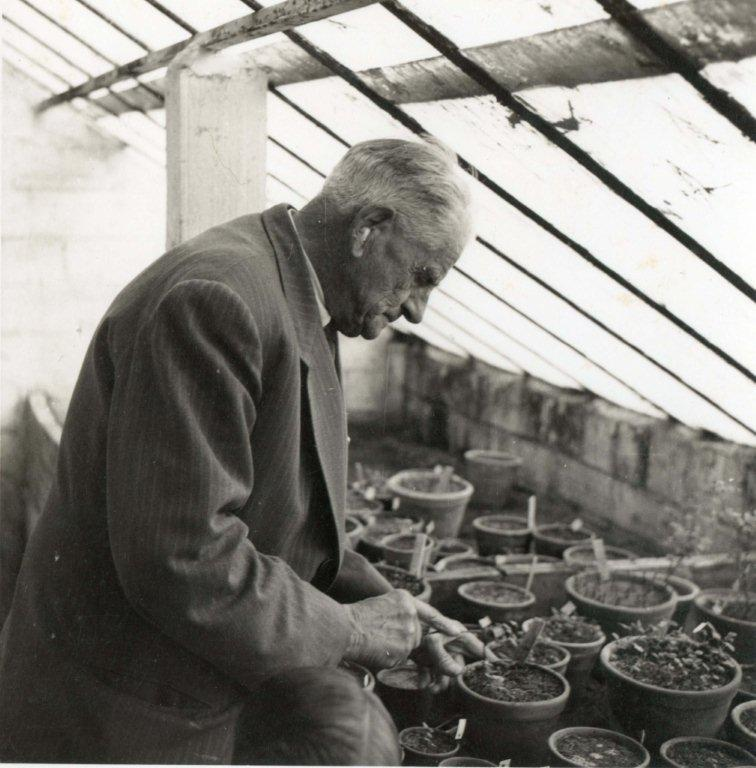
Pedro Dot in his greenhouse nursery.

== More rose photos ==
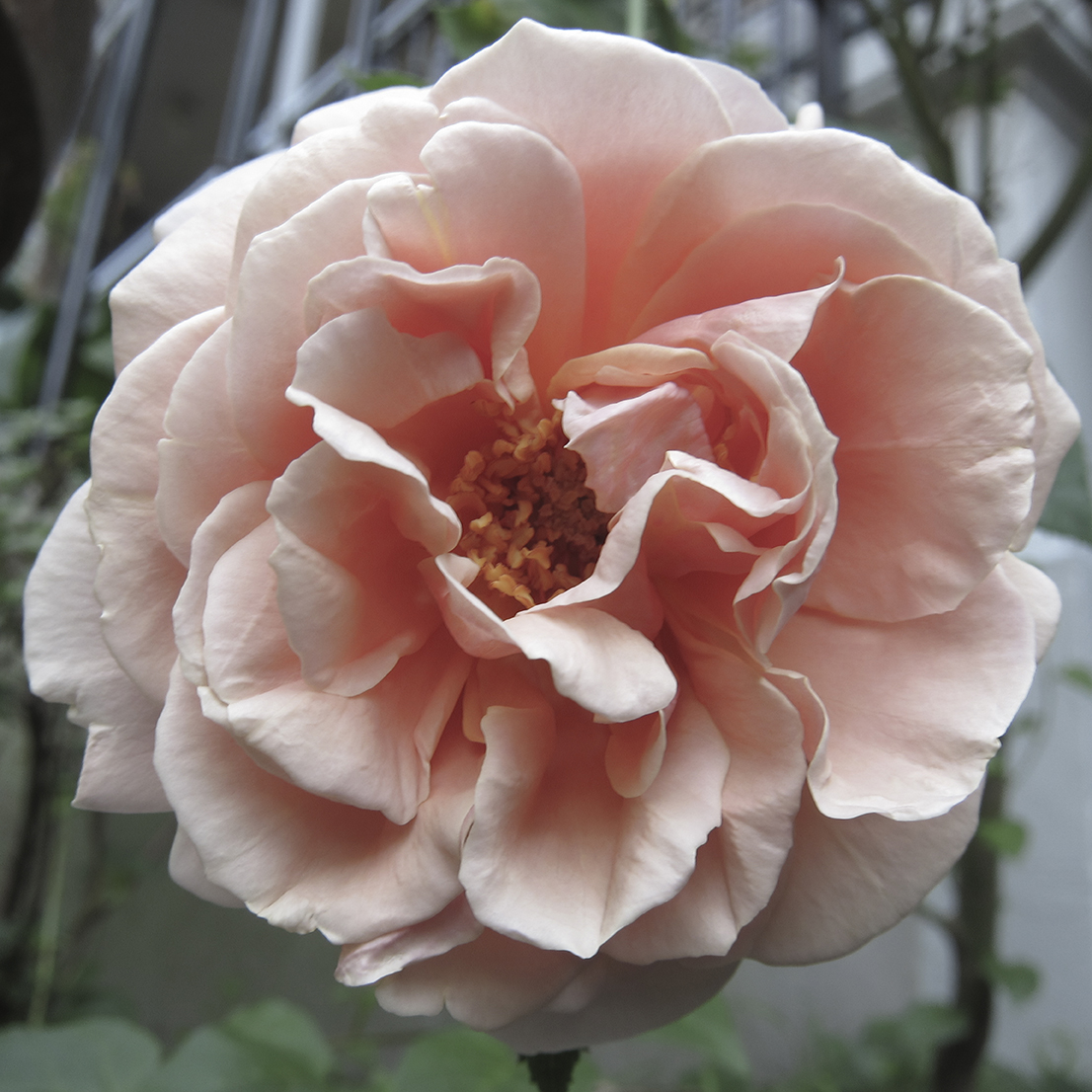
'Duquesa de Peñaranda' 1931, hybrid tea

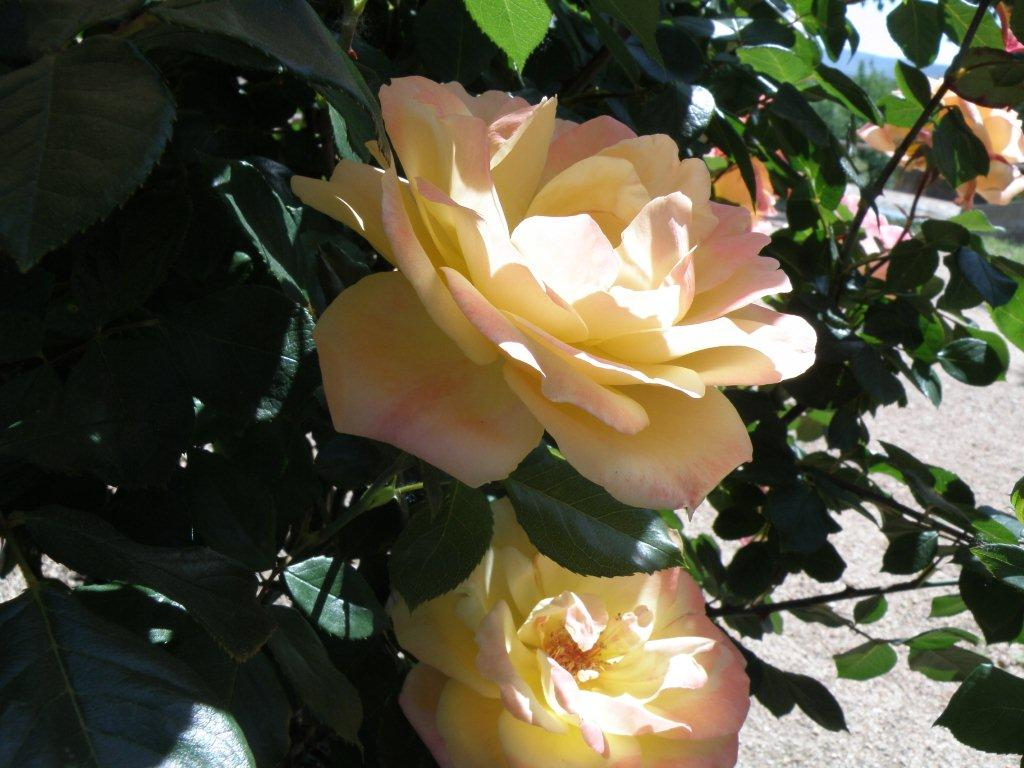
'Federico Casas' hybrid tea 1932

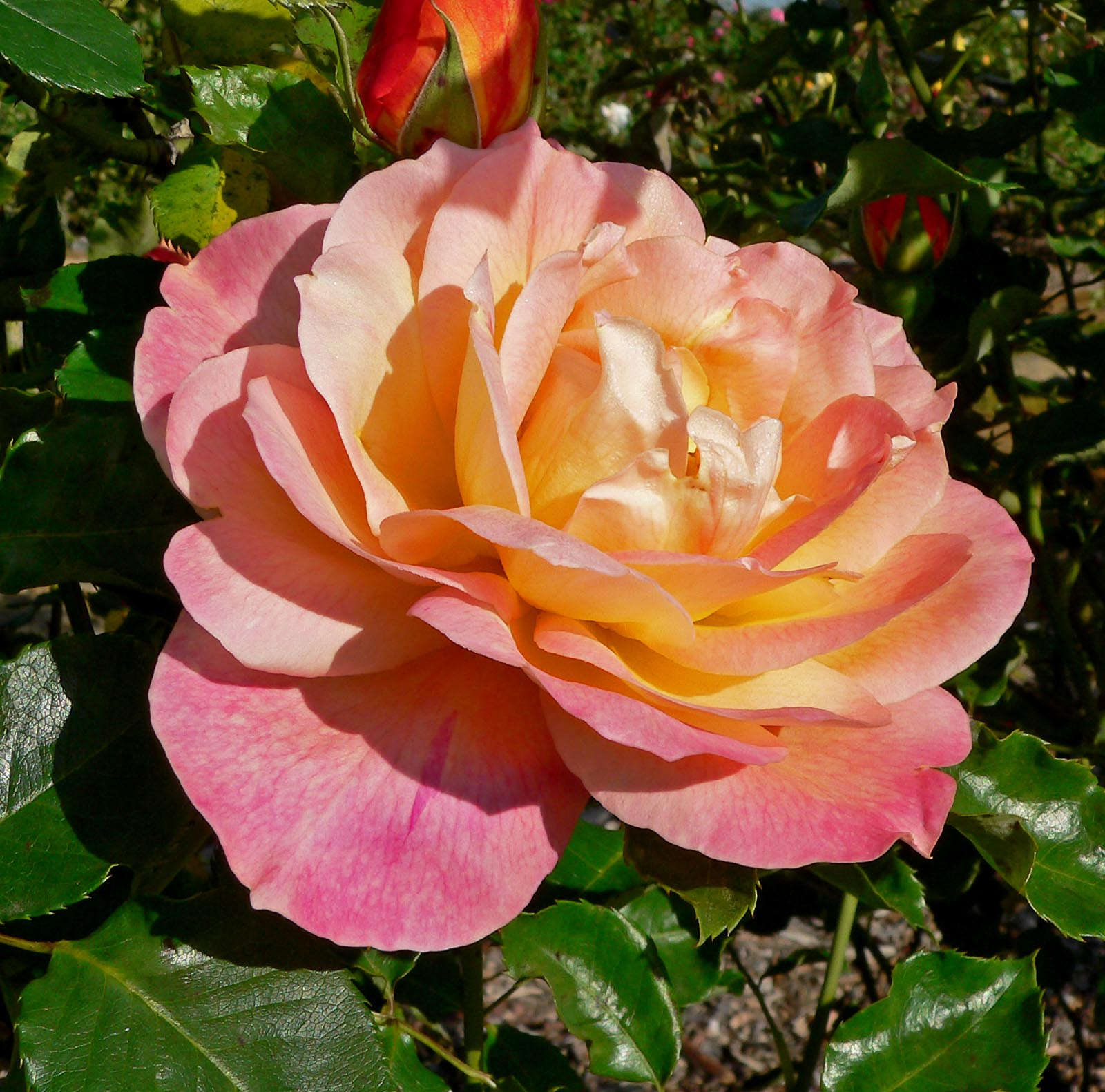
'Girona' damask-scented hybrid tea 1936

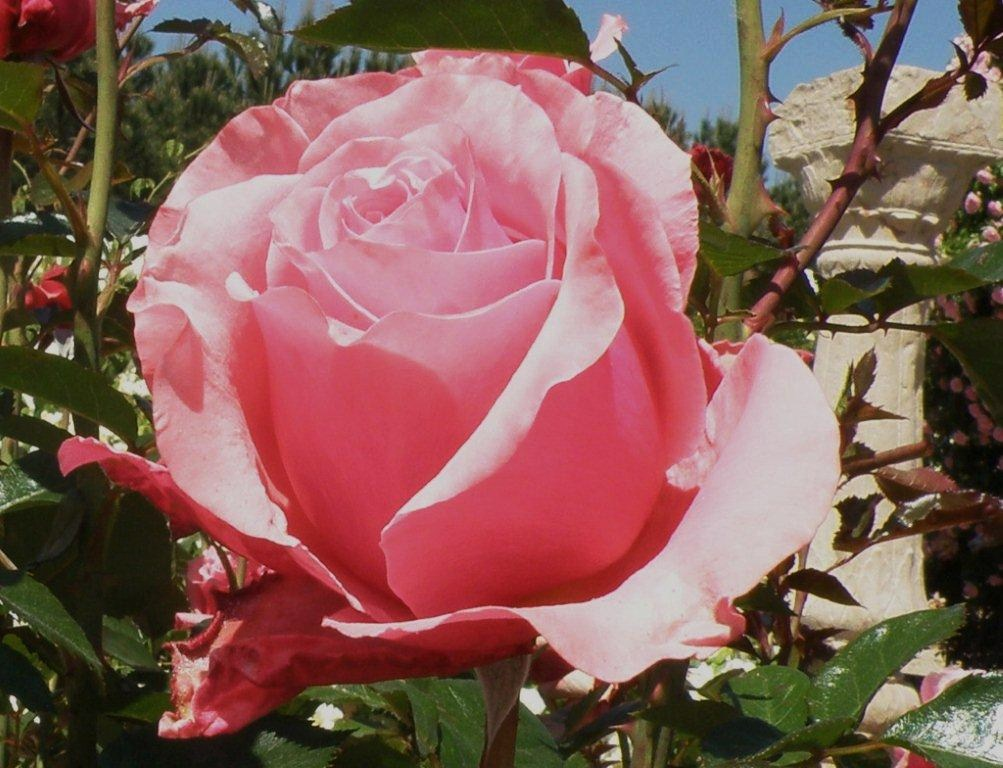
'Linda Porter' ('Miquel Aldrufeu') hybrid tea 1957. Linda was the late wife of Cole Porter the composer.

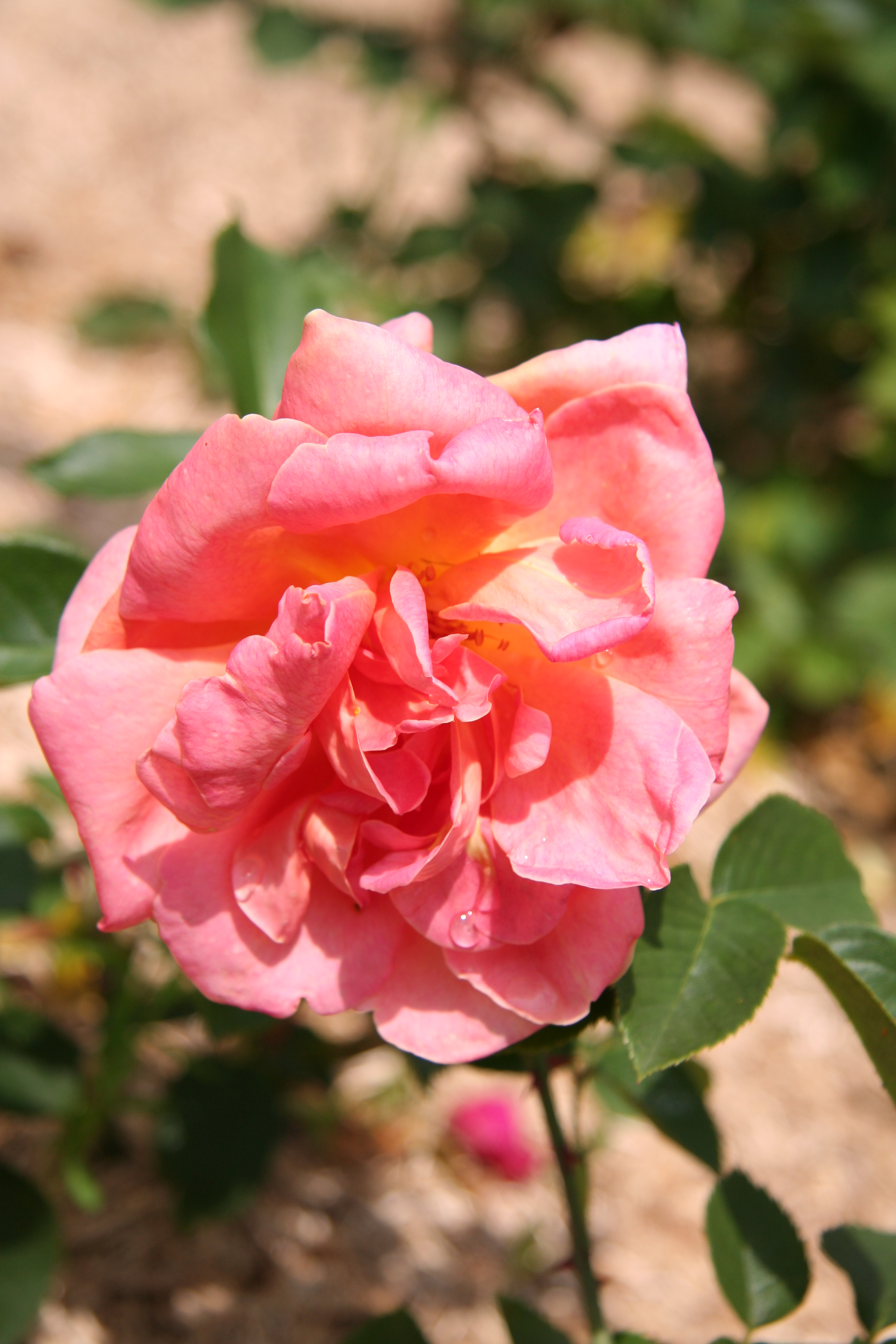
'Luis Briñas' hybrid tea 1932

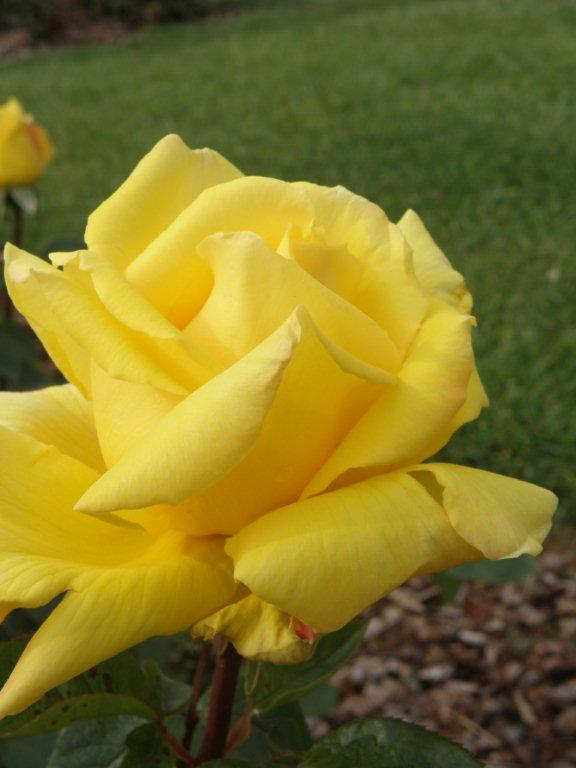
'Joaquin Mir' 1940, "true deep yellows"

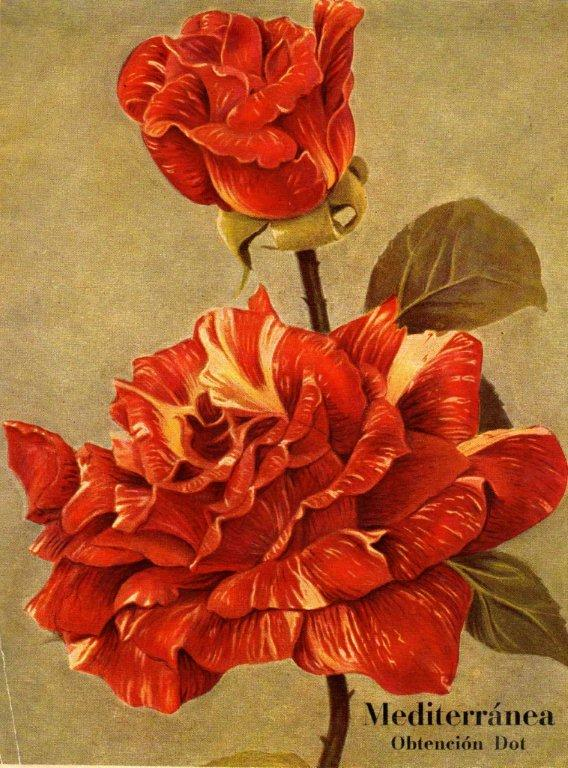
'Mediterrànea' hybrid tea 1943, Dot catalogue cover

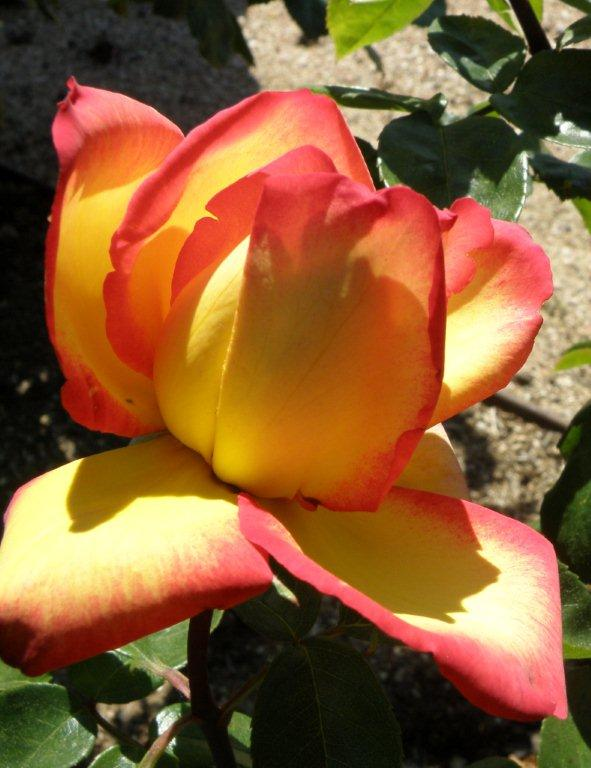
'Hong Kong' hybrid tea 1962

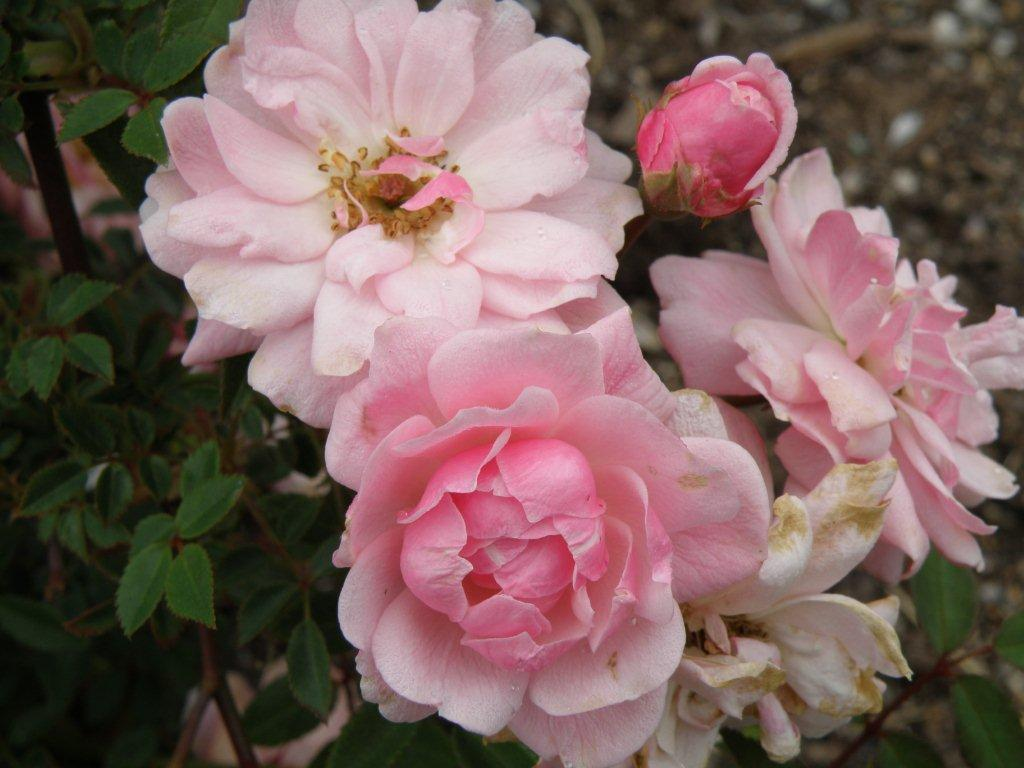
'Perla de Montserrat' miniature hybrid tea 1945

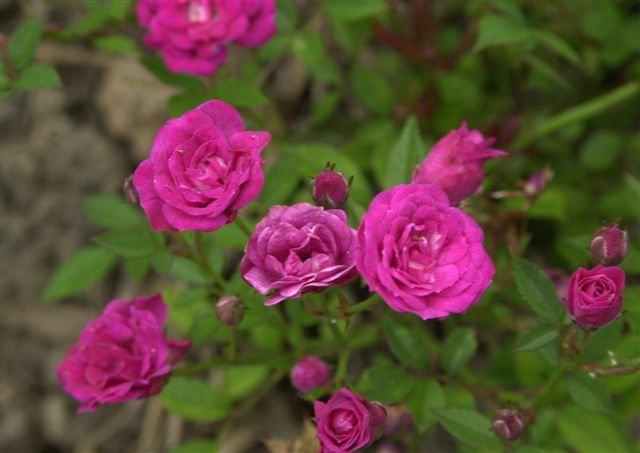
'Perla de Alcanada' miniature 1944

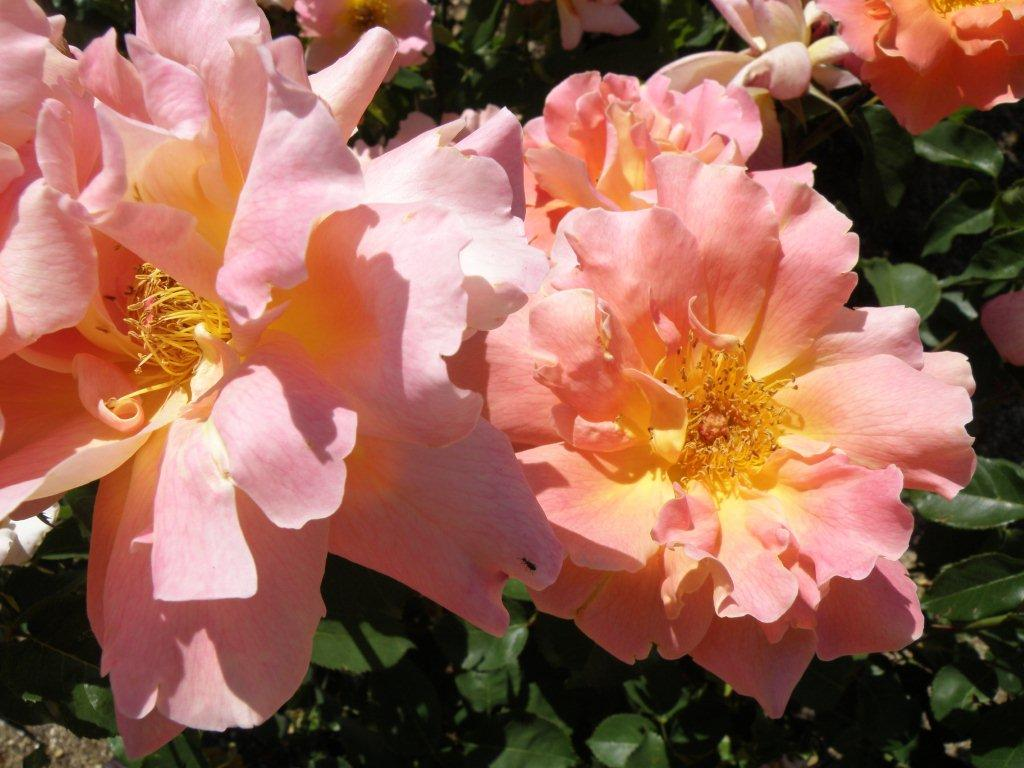
'Ramon Bach' 1938. Bach was a vigneron friend killed in the war.

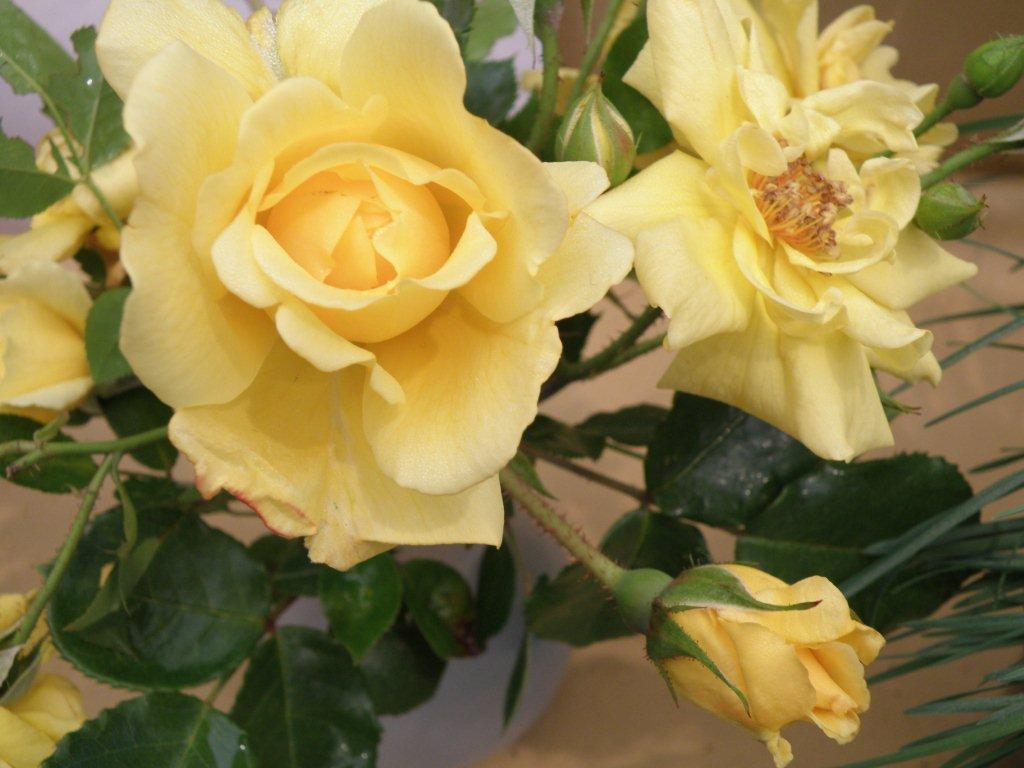
'Rosina' miniature 1951
