= Port d'Alcúdia =

Port d'Alcudia
- town
- Coat of arms

- Map of Alcúdia in Mallorca

- Location in Mallorca Port d'Alcudia (Balearic Islands) Port d'Alcudia (Spain)
- Coordinates: 39°50′31″N 3°07′58″E
- Country: Spain
- Autonomous community: Balearic Islands
- Insular council: Mallorca
- Comarca: Raiguer
- Judicial district: Inca

Population (2025)
  - Total: 5,196
- Time zone: UTC+1 (CET)
  - Summer (DST): UTC+2 (CEST)
- Postal code: 07400

Port d'Alcudia is a town and tourist resort in North East Mallorca. It neighbours the town of Alcúdia and has many hotels and tourist venues located within the town. Port d'Alcudia has a large beach which links up to nearby Muro Beach.

Port d'Alcúdia is home to one of Europe's largest hotel complexes, the BelleVue Club. With 8 swimming pools and 17 apartment blocks the complex is set in 150,000 square meters of gardens. Its sister hotel the BelleVue Lagomonte is also located in Port d'Alcúdia.

== See also ==
- Alcanada
