= Rosa 'Nevada' =

White climbing rose cultivar

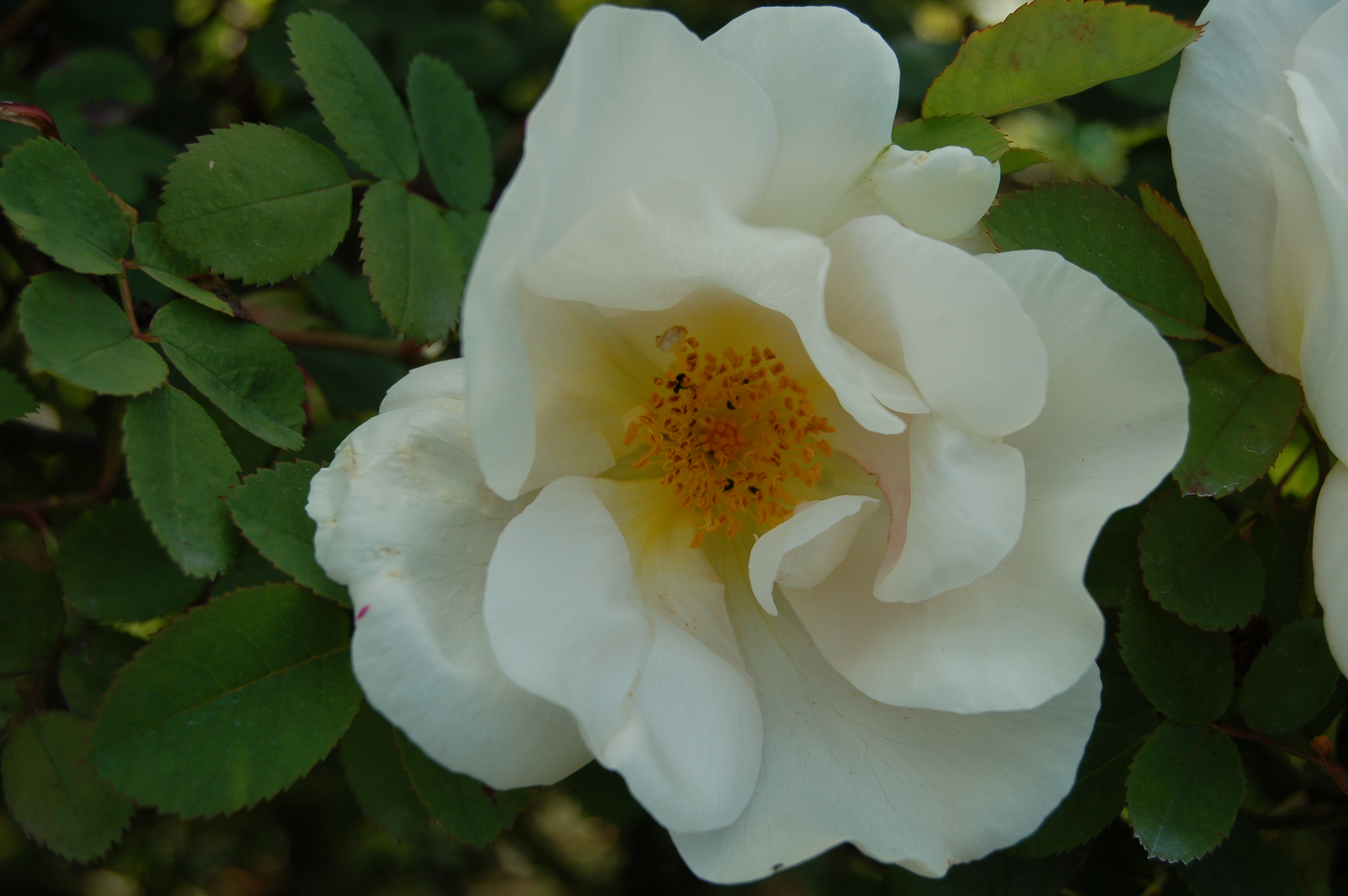
- From Rosarium Uetersen, Germany.
- Genus: Rosa
- Hybrid parentage: 'La Giralda' × 'Altaica'
- Cultivar group: climbing rose
- Cultivar: 'Nevada'
- Marketing names: Rosa moyesii 'Nevada'
- Breeder: Pedro Dot
- Origin: Spain, 1927

Rosa 'Nevada' is a white climbing rose cultivar developed by Pedro Dot in SpRoain in 1927. It is one of his most successful creations and is named for its colour, as nevada is the Spanish word for "snowy." Its parentage was long under discussion, as Dot introduced the cultivar as a hybrid moyesii, but the cultivar's round, black hips point to its R. pimpinellifolia-parentage. It is probably a cross between Dot's pink hybrid tea 'La Giralda' (introduced in 1926) and the wild rose species Rosa pimpinellifolia var. altaica (synonym R. 'Altaica'), but is sometimes still described as a hybrid moyesii.

The single to semi-double flowers grow on short stems with open blooms an average diameter of 4 to 5 inches (10–13 cm). The ovoid buds have a pink or apricot colour and open to ivory-coloured flowers, which normally quickly fade to white (but can turn pink in hot weather), with golden-yellow stamens. They have a mild, sweet fragrance. The blooming season starts with an abundant first flush in early summer (end of May to mid-June), further flowers appear sparingly throughout the season, with the possibility of a second in autumn. Later flowers are also often tinged pink. The removal of spent blooms helps to encourage re-bloom.

In autumn, the rose develops some reddish brown, globular hips with an average diameter of 4 inches (10 cm).

'Nevada' forms tall climbing bushes with roundish, light green leaves. The long, arching shoots have a dark chocolate brown color, few prickles, and are entirely covered with blooms during the first flowering flush. The shrub reaches an average height of 7 to 13 feet (210–400 cm) and due to its arching habit a width of 8 to 13 feet (240–400 cm), but can grow even higher in warmer climates. 'Nevada' can grow suckers on its own roots. The vigorous cultivar tolerates rain and poorer soils, is very hardy down to −37 °C (−35 °F), (USDA zone 3b and warmer), and generally disease resistant, but can be susceptible to black spot. 'Nevada' is suitable for plantation in woodland areas or near water, and can be grown as solitaire shrub, in small groups, as hedge, or trained as a climber.

Peter Beales calls 'Nevada' one of the best-known semi-double shrub roses. In 1993, the rose cultivar was granted the Award of Garden Merit by the Royal Horticultural Society, but the award was retracted with the reformation of the RHS Award of Garden Merit criteria in 2012/13.

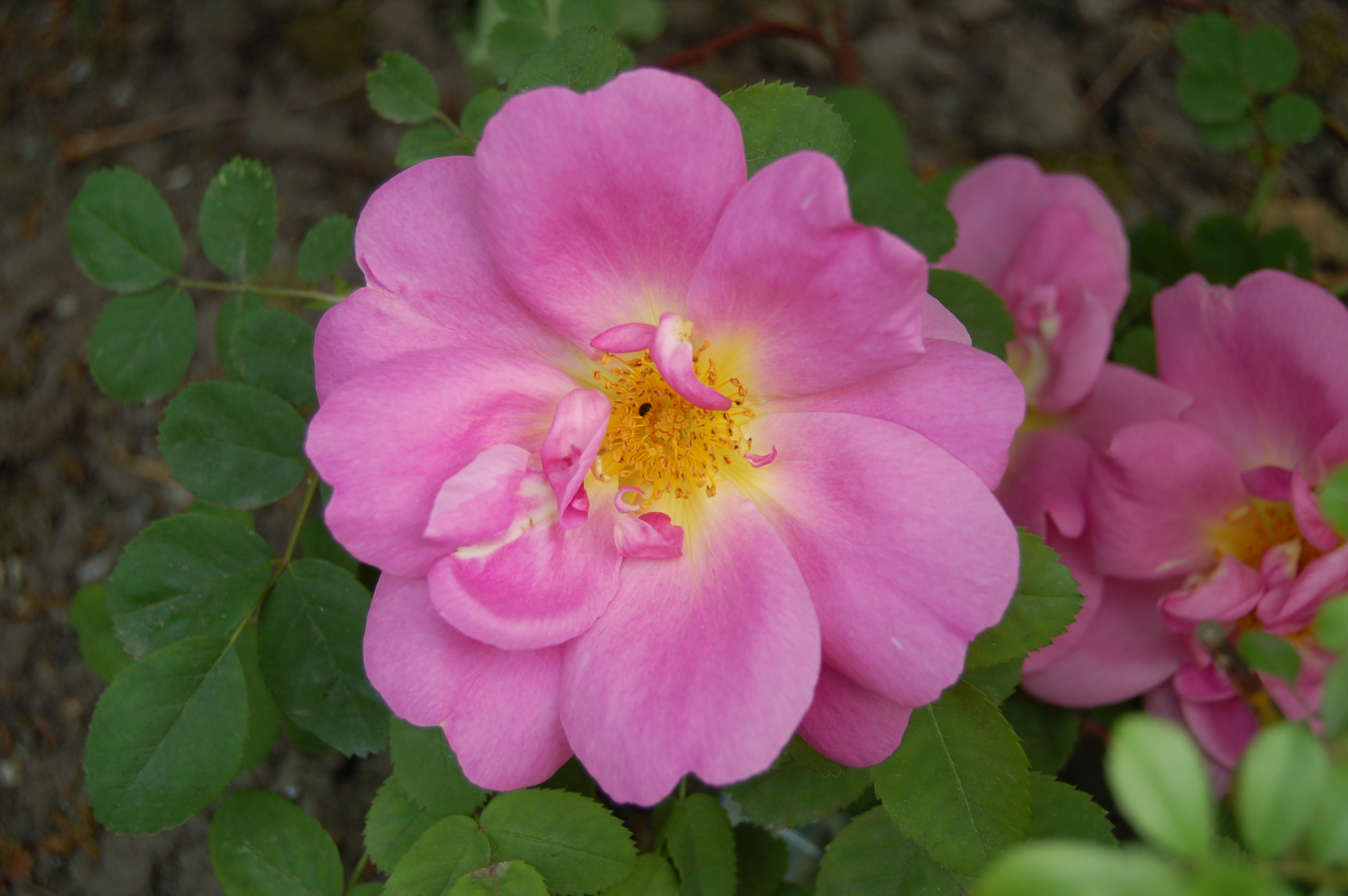
The pink sport 'Marguerite Hilling', introduced by Thomas Hilling in 1959

'Marguerite Hilling', also called 'Pink Nevada' is a sport of 'Nevada' discovered by Thomas Hilling (United Kingdom) in the 1950s, that strongly resembles its parent in everything but its colour.

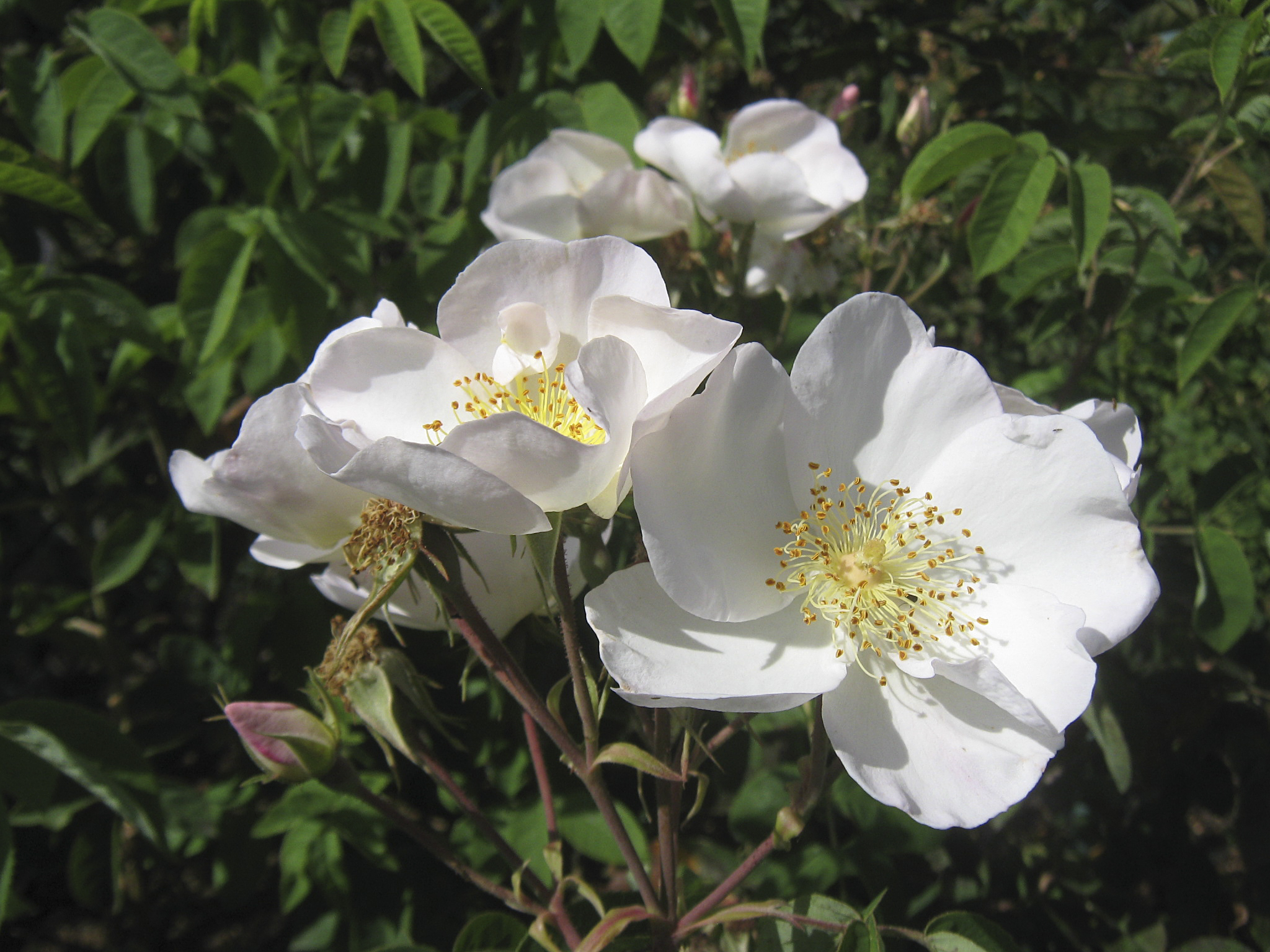
white flowers (Werribee Park, Victoria, Australia)

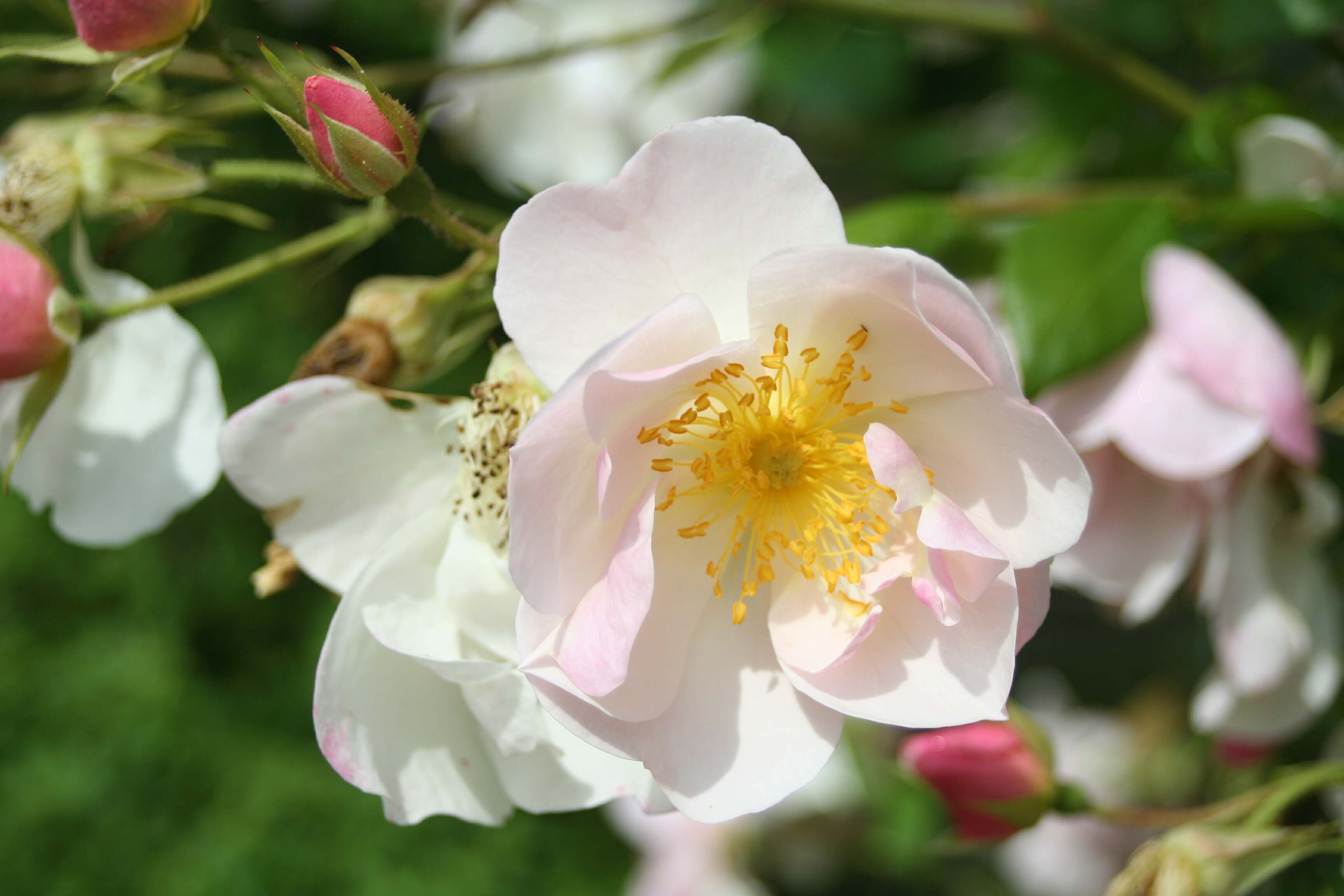
pink flushed flowers (Épône, France)

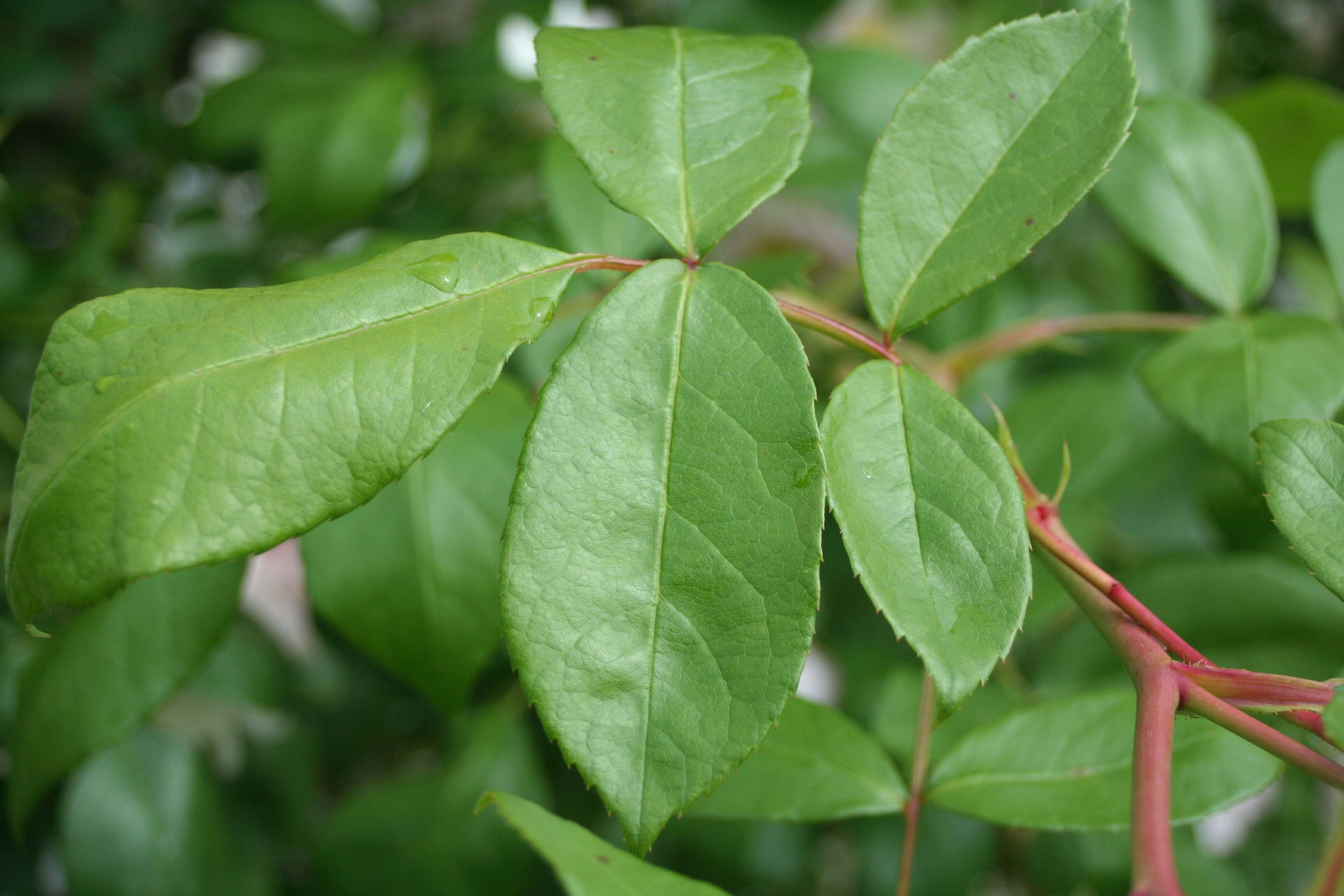
leaves (Real Jardín Botánico de Madrid, Spain)

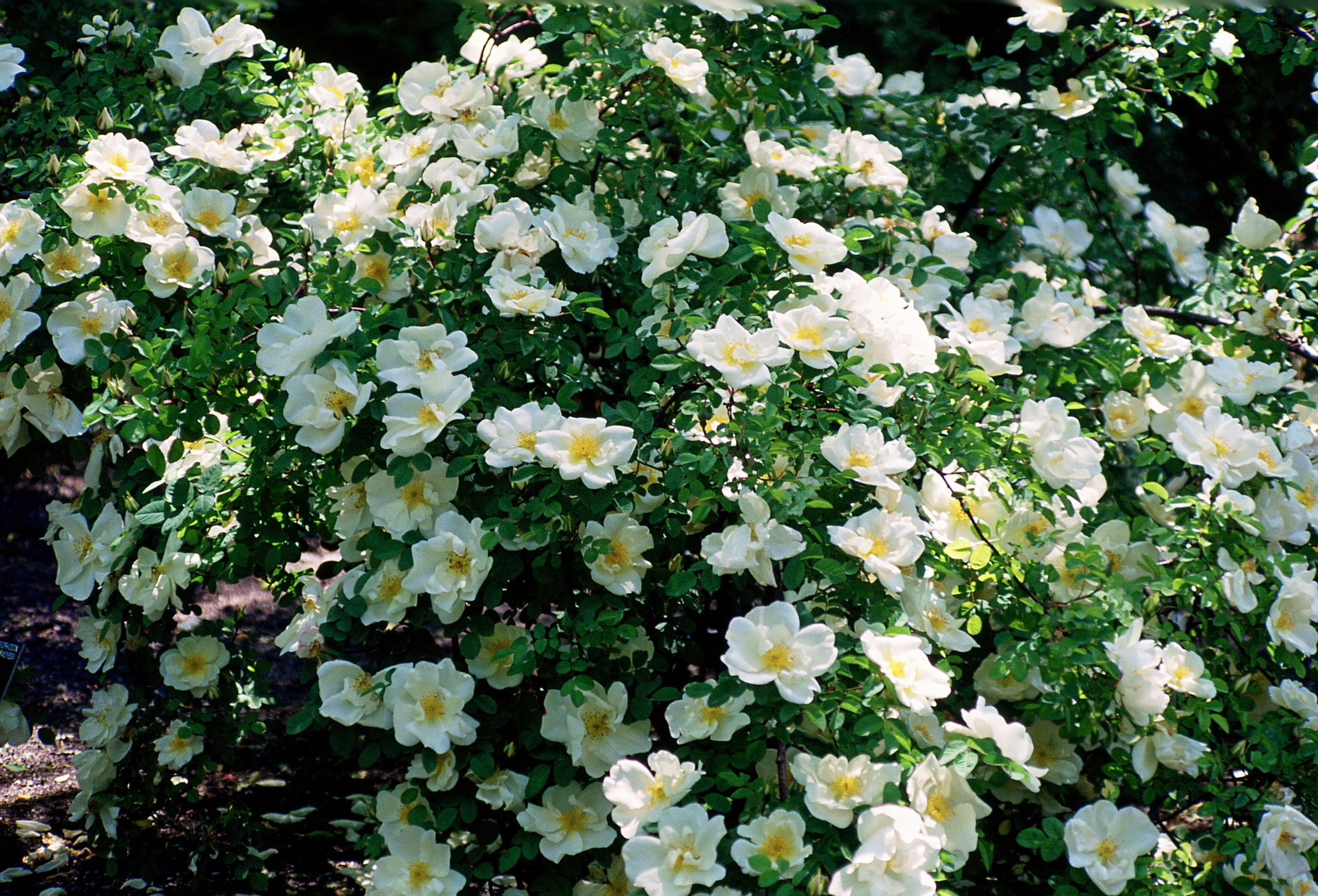
shrub (Real Jardín Botánico de Madrid, Spain)

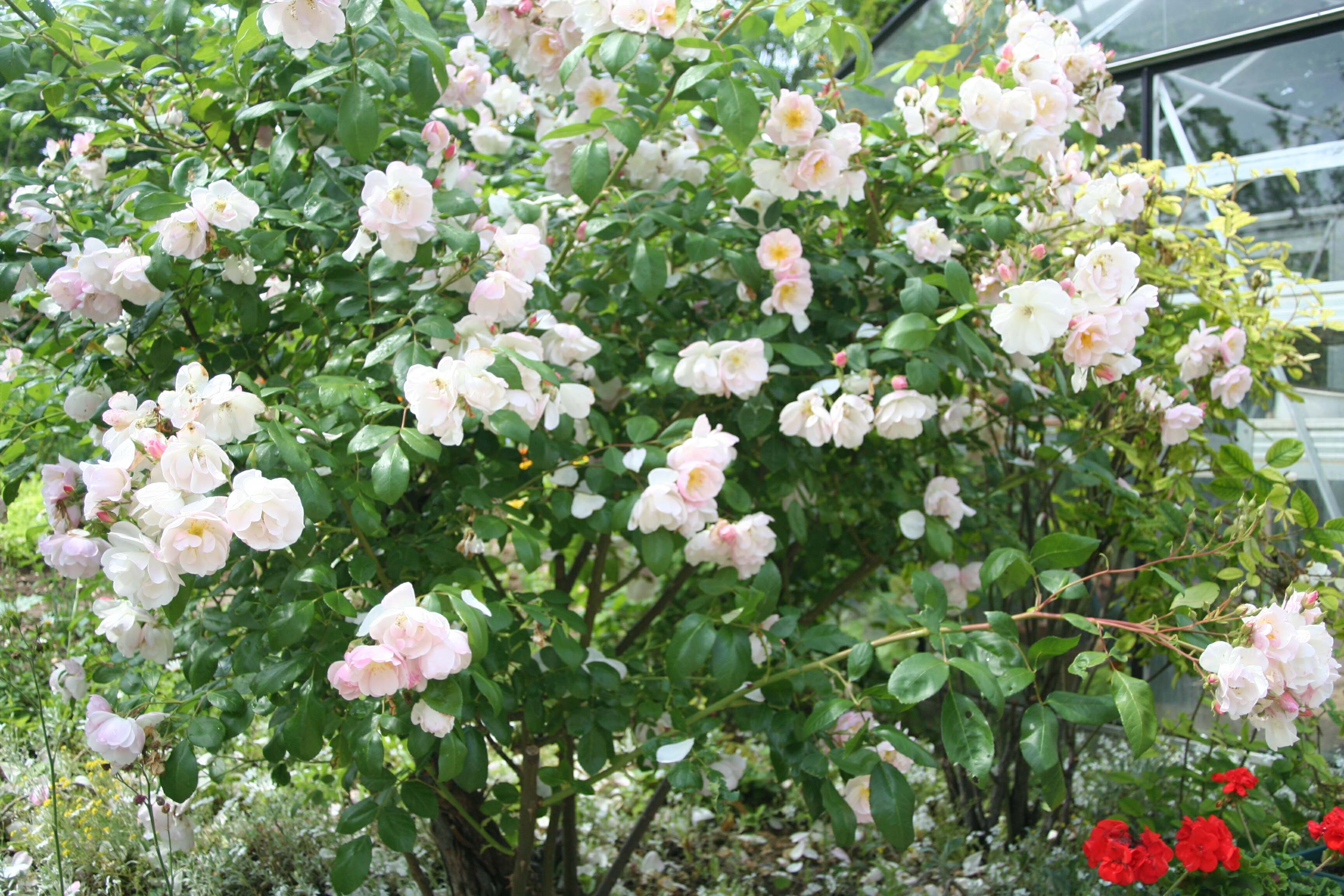
shrub (Épône, France)
