= Joan Binimelis =

Spanish priest, physician, geographer, astronomer, and writer

Joan Binimelis (1538–1616) was a Spanish priest, physician, geographer, astronomer and writer. He is considered the first chronicler of the Kingdom of Mallorca.
