= Fundacion Yannick y Ben Jakober =

Yannick and Ben Jakober's Foundation
- Fundación Yannick y Ben Jakober
- Location: Alcudia, Mallorca, Spain
- Type: Art museum
- President: Yannick Vu
- Website: fundacionjakober.org

The Fundación Yannick y Ben Jakober is a non-profit cultural institution established in Alcudia, Mallorca, Spain, in 1993. It is dedicated primarily to the preservation and restoration of Spanish historical heritage. It also promotes the development of the fine arts, especially painting and sculpture, including art exhibitions, educational activities, and artistic exchange. Its main territorial scope is the Balearic Islands.

The headquarters of the foundation is the Sa Bassa Blanca Museum, whose main building was designed by the Egyptian architect Hassan Fathy in 1978. This building was declared a Listed Building (Landmark) by the Heritage Commission of the Government of Mallorca in 2011. The foundation is known for its collection of Old Master portraits of children from the 16th century to the 19th century, also listed as a Historical Heritage, and on public display in an old water reservoir conditioned for this purpose.

== See also ==
- Culture of Mallorca
