= Rosa 'Alpine Sunset' =

Apricot hybrid tea rose

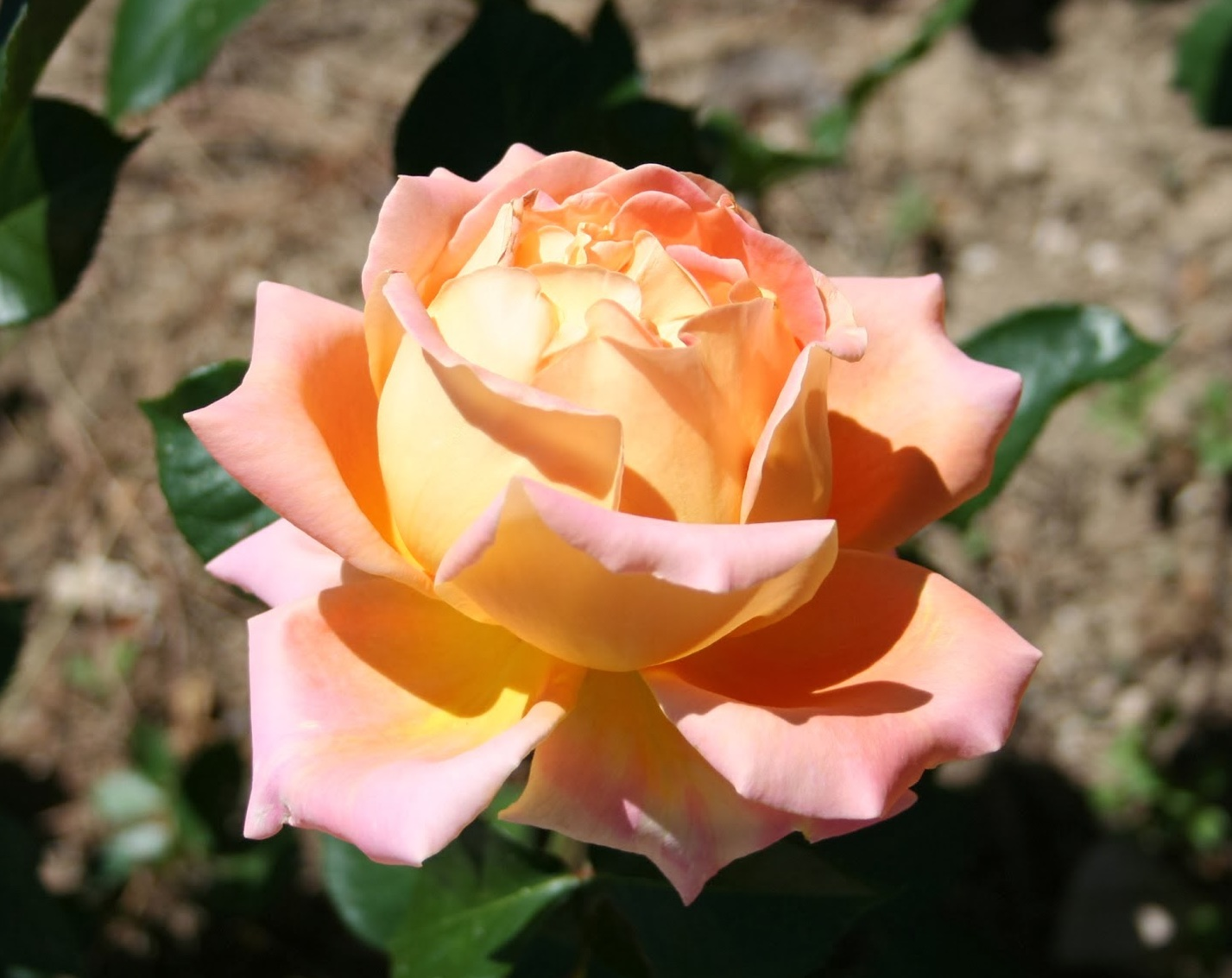
- Rosa 'Alpine Sunset'
- Genus: Rosa hybrid
- Hybrid parentage: 'Dr. A.J. Verhage' x 'Irish Gold'
- Cultivar group: Hybrid tea
- Breeder: Roger Pawsey
- Origin: Great Britain, 1973

Rosa 'Alpine Sunset' is an apricot blend hybrid tea rose developed by Roger Pawsey of Cants of Colchester, Essex in 1973. The cultivar was introduced into Great Britain in 1974.

== History ==
Cants of Colchester is the oldest firm of commercial rose growers in Great Britain. The company was founded by Benjamin Cant in 1765 under the name, 'Benjamin R. Cant & Sons' and was located in Mile End, now a northern suburb of Colchester. The nursery originally sold a variety of plants, seeds, bulbs and trees. With the rise in popularity of roses in the mid-1800s, Benjamin R. Cant (1827-1900), initiated a rose breeding program at the company in 1875. By 1880, Cant had become an award-winning rose exhibitor in England.

Cant's nephew, Frank Cant (1857-1928), split from the family firm and established his own nursery in Colchester in the early 1880s. The two Cant families became fierce competitors. The rivalry between the two nurseries lasted until the 1960s, when their descendants decided to merge the two family businesses into one company. The 'Benjamin R Cant & Sons' of Mile End Colchester and 'Frank Cant & Company' of Stanway, Essex became the 'Cants of Colchester' under the leadership of Cant family descendant, Roger Pawsey. Cants of Colchester has introduced several popular rose varieties, including Rosa 'Just Joey', Rosa 'Alpine Sunset' and Rosa 'Goldstar'.

Pawsey developed the new rose variety, 'Alpine Sunset' in 1973 from hybrid tea roses, Dr. A.J. Verhage and Irish Gold (also known as 'Grandpa Dickson'). 'Alpine Sunset' was used to develop two child plants: Rosa 'Pretty Lady' (1997) and Rosa 'Yardley Baroque' (before 1997).

== Description ==
'Alpine Sunset' is an upright, compact shrub, 2 to 4 ft (60–120 cm) in height, with a 2 to 3 ft spread (60–91 cm). The rose has a large, cupped, full bloom form. Blooms have an average diameter of 4-5 in (10–13 cm) with 30 or more petals and a strong fragrance. The plant blooms in flushes from summer to fall. Flower color is an apricot blend, often displaying peach with an apricot reverse. The plant thrives in USDA zones 7b and warmer.
