= Rosa 'English Miss' =

Pale pink floribunda rose cultivar

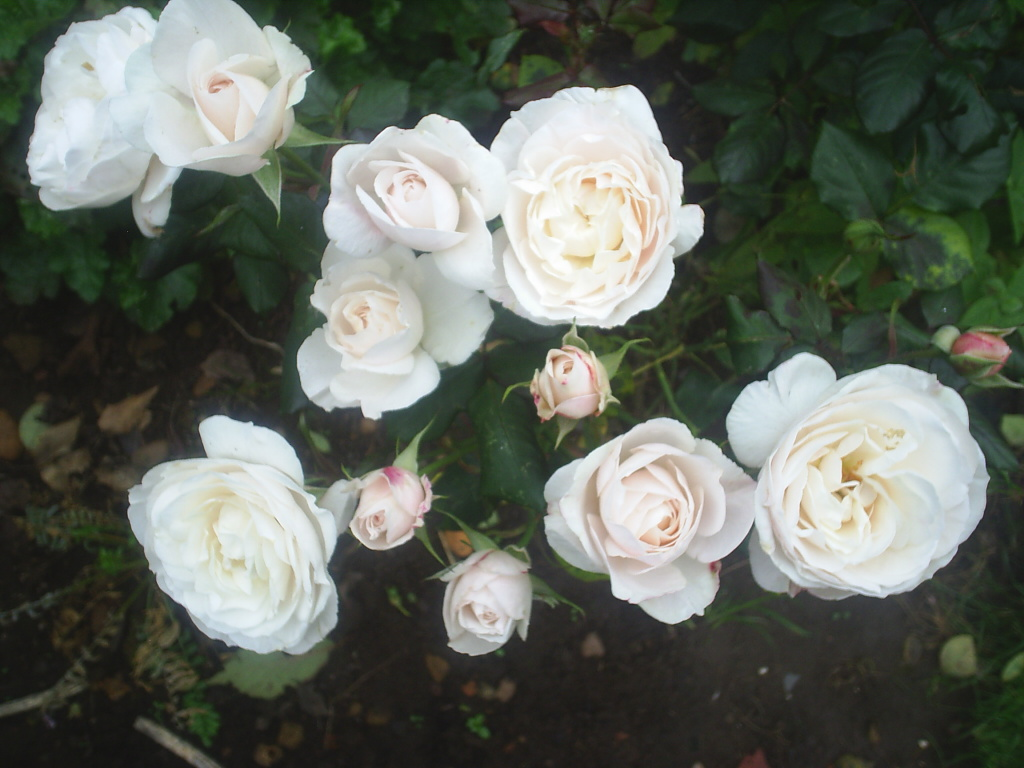
- Rosa 'English Miss'
- Genus: Rosa hybrid
- Hybrid parentage: Rosa 'Dearest' × Rosa 'Sweet Repose'
- Cultivar group: Floribunda
- Breeder: Roger Pawsey
- Origin: Great Britain, 1977

Rosa 'English Miss' is a Floribunda rose bred by Roger Pawsey of Cants of Colchester, Essex in 1977. The cultivar was introduced into Great Britain in 1979. The plant is a compact, bushy shrub with light pink camellia-like flowers. It is disease resistant and blooms continuously from June to mid-October.

== History ==
Cants of Colchester is the oldest firm of commercial rose growers in Great Britain. The company was founded by Benjamin Cant in 1765 under the name, 'Benjamin R. Cant & Sons' and was located in Mile End, now a northern suburb of Colchester. The nursery originally sold a variety of plants, seeds, bulbs and trees. With the rise in popularity of roses in the mid-1800s, Benjamin R. Cant (1827–1900), initiated a rose breeding program at the company in 1875. By 1880, Cant had become an award-winning rose exhibitor in England.

Cant's nephew, Frank Cant (1857–1928), split from the family firm and established his own nursery in Colchester in the early 1880s. The two Cant families became fierce competitors. The rivalry between the two nurseries lasted until the 1960s, when their descendants decided to merge the two family businesses into one company. The 'Benjamin R Cant & Sons' of Mile End Colchester and 'Frank Cant & Company' of Stanway, Essex became the 'Cants of Colchester' under the leadership of Cant family descendant, Roger Pawsey. Cants of Colchester has introduced several popular rose varieties, including Rosa 'Just Joey', Rosa 'Alpine Sunset' and Rosa 'Goldstar'.

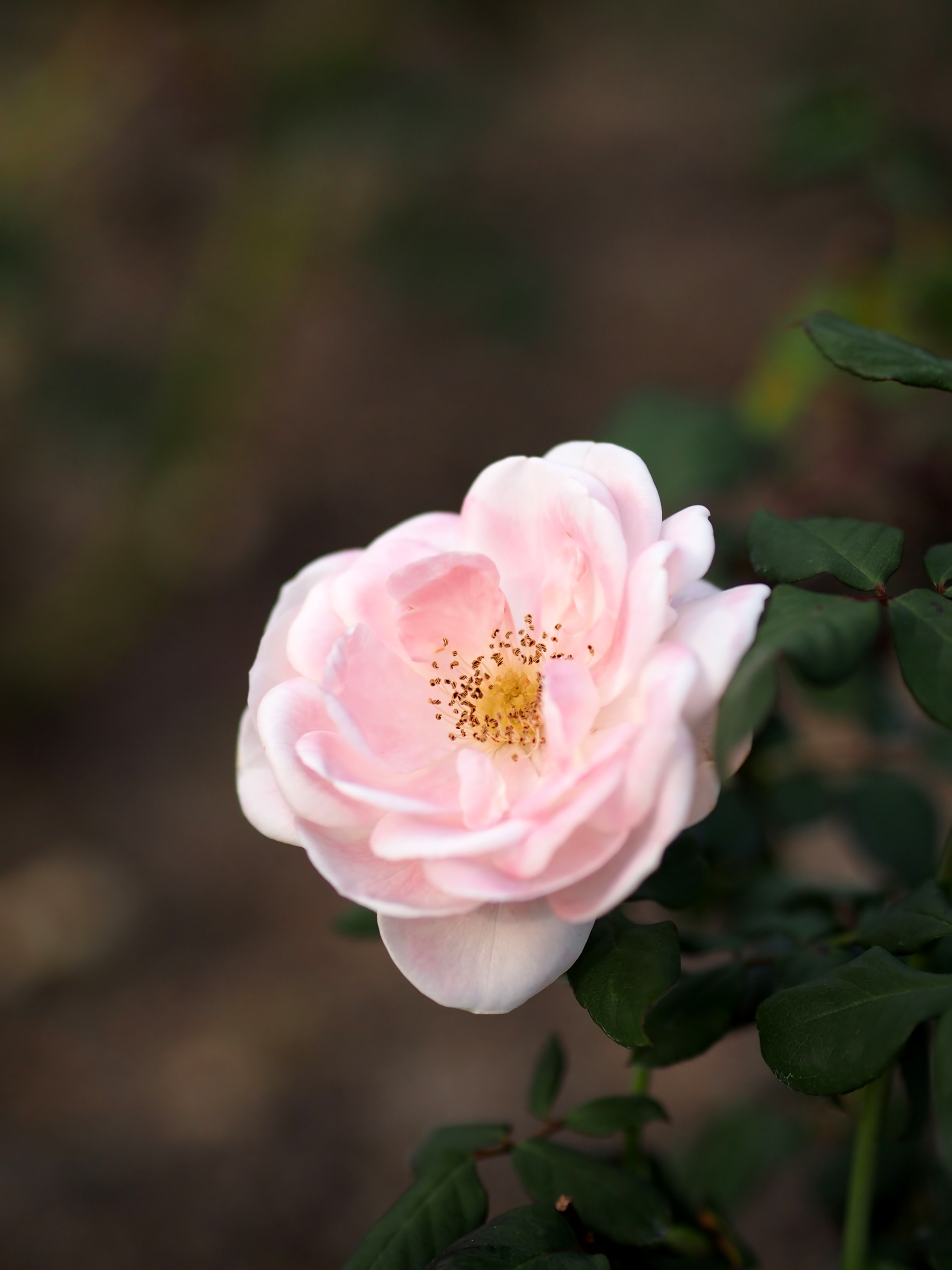
Rosa 'English Miss'

Pawsey developed the new rose variety, 'English Miss' in 1977. The rose was named in honour of Pawsey's three-year-old daughter Sally-Anne. It was introduced into Britain in 1979. The cultivar is a hybrid of Rosa 'Dearest' and Rosa 'The Optimist'. 'English Miss' was used to hybridize two child plants: Rosa 'Colchester Beauty', (Pawsey, before 1992) and Rosa 'Our Beth' (Beales, before 2006).

== Description ==
'English Miss' is a compact bushy shrub, 2 to 3 ft (60–91 cm) in height, with a 2 to 3 ft spread (60–91 cm). Blooms are large, 4 inch (10 cm), with 24 or more petals, Flowers are double in form, camellia-like and emit a strong and sweet fragrance with a spicy undertone. They are often borne in large clusters in the traditional floribunda style. 'English Miss' is pale pink in colour, often with darker pink edges. The plant blooms repeatedly, starting from June and progressing through to mid-October. Foliage is purple to dark green and leathery. Flowers do extremely well in rainy weather. 'English Miss' can tolerate exposed conditions and has good disease resistance, especially against the common rose disease black spot.
