= Keith Adams (cricketer) =

English cricketer

Personal information
- Born: 6 June 1932; Aberford, Yorkshire, England
- Died: 8 November 2018 (aged 86); Colchester, Essex, England
- Batting: Right-handed

Domestic team information
- Years: Team
- 1954: Cambridge University

Career statistics
Competition	First-class
Matches	1
Runs scored	34
Batting average	17.00
100s/50s	–/–
Top score	34
Catches/stumpings	1/–
- Source: Cricinfo, 10 January 2012

Keith Adams (6 June 1932 – 8 November 2018) was an English first-class cricketer. Adams was a right-handed batsman. He was born at Aberford, Yorkshire.

While studying at Emmanuel College in the University of Cambridge, Adams made a single first-class appearance for Cambridge University against Middlesex at Fenner's in 1954. Adams opened the batting for Cambridge University, being dismissed for a duck by Don Bennett in their first-innings, while in their second-innings he was dismissed for 34 runs by Charles Robins. Middlesex won the match by 4 wickets.

After leaving Cambridge University he became a teacher and served 18 years as head of Alderman Blaxill School. He died on 8 November 2018 at the age of 86.
