= Cants of Colchester =

British firm of rose growers

Cants of Colchester was a firm of commercial rose growers, and was the oldest in Britain at the time of its closure in 2023. The company was established as a general nursery by Benjamin Cant in 1765 in Myland, Essex. The family nursery initiated a rose breeding programme in 1875. Early rose varieties include 'Ben Cant' (1901) and 'Golden Ophelia' (1918). The company's most successful new rose cultivars include 'Just Joey' (1972), 'Alpine Sunset' (1973), and 'English Miss' (1977).

== History ==
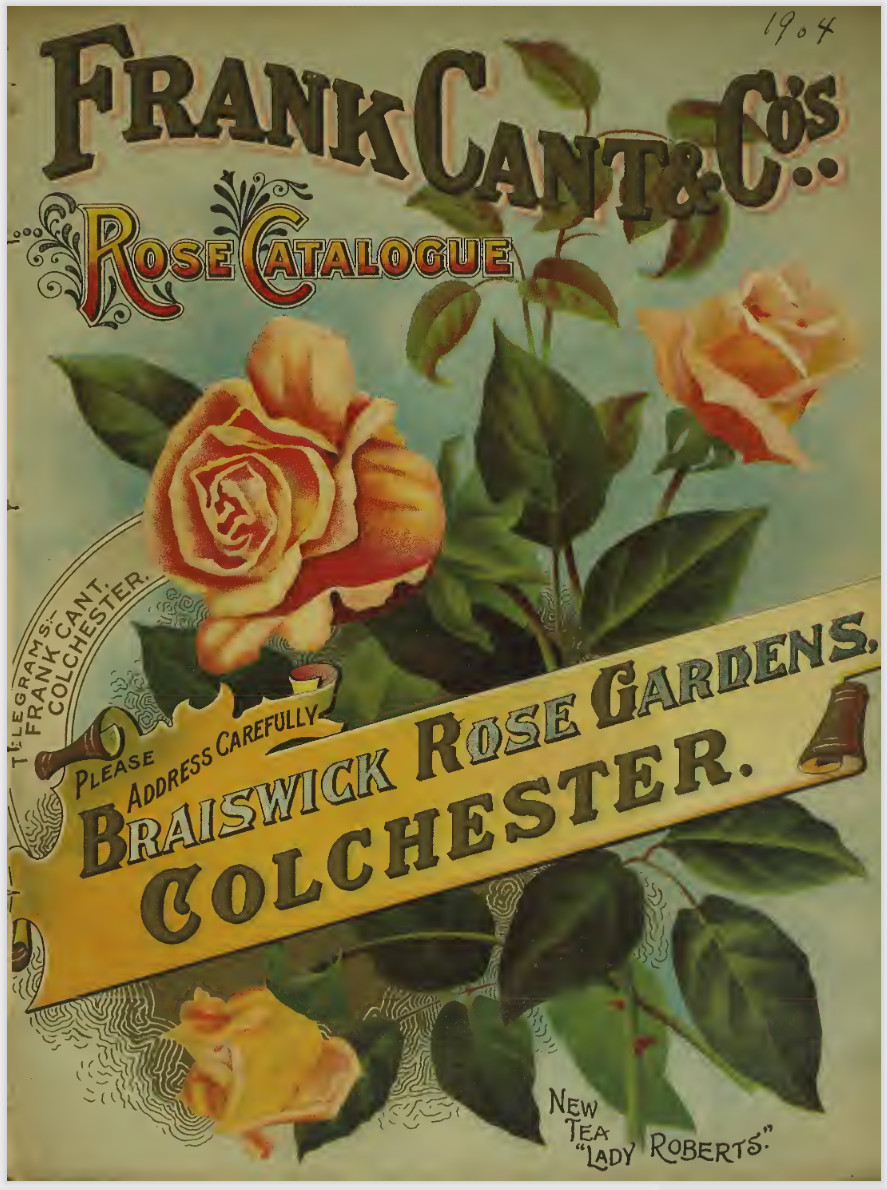
Frank Cant & Co.

Cants of Colchester, the oldest commercial rose growers in Great Britain, was founded by Benjamin Cant in 1765. The nursery, 'Benjamin R Cant & Sons', was located in Mile End, now a northern suburb of Colchester. The firm originally sold a variety of plants, seeds, bulbs and trees, including azaleas, rhododendrons and peach and apricot trees. With the rise in popularity of roses in the mid 1800s, Benjamin R. Cant (1827-1900) initiated a rose breeding program in 1875. By 1880, Cant had become a very successful rose exhibitor in England.

Cant's nephew, Frank Cant (1857-1928), left the family business to establish his own nursery in Colchester in the early 1880s. The two Cant families became fierce competitors. The rivalry between the two nurseries lasted until the 1960s, when their descendants decided to merge the two family businesses into one company. The 'Benjamin R Cant & Sons' of Mile End Colchester and 'Frank Cant & Company' of Stanway, Essex became the 'Cants of Colchester' under the leadership of Cant family descendant, Roger Pawsey. The company remained in the family until its closure in September 2023, with a 1,600 housing development built on the business’ former rose growing fields.

== Cant's Roses ==
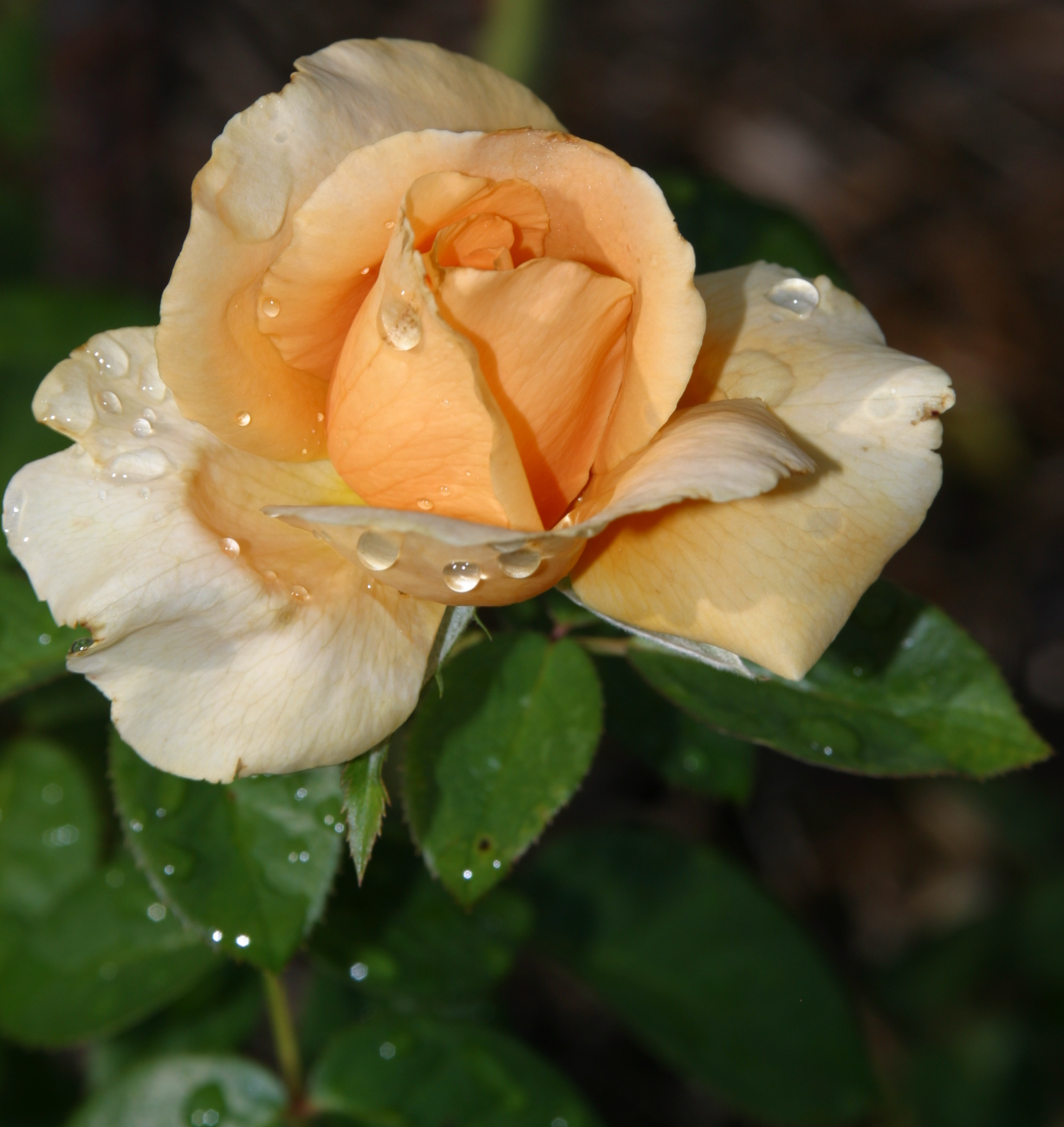
'Abbaye de Cluny' 1995

The Cant family has introduced more than 130 new rose varieties since 1875. Early roses include 'Ben Cant' (1901), 'Augustus Hartmann' (2014), and 'Golden Ophelia' (1918). Frank Kant and Company developed several successful rose varieties from the turn of the century through the 1920s, including 'Blush Queen' (1916), 'Yvonne' (1920) and 'Henry Nevard' (1924).

Roses bred by Roger Pawsey at Cants of Colchester include many of the company's most successful rose varieties, including 'English Miss', 'Alpine Sunset', 'Sally's Rose' and 'Goldstar'. The company's most successful rose is the buff-orange, hybrid tea, 'Just Joey'. Created in 1972 by Roger Pawsey and named in honor of his wife, Joey Pawsey, 'Just Joey' has won multiple awards and was inducted into the Rose Hall of Fame as "World's Favourite Rose" in 1994.

== Select roses ==
- 'Ben Cant', (B.R. Cant & Sons), 1901
- 'Blush Rambler, (B.R. Cant & Sons), 1903
- 'White Dorothy', (B.R. Cant & Sons), 1908
- Rosa 'Emily Gray', (B.R. Cant & Sons), 1918
- 'Golden Ophelia', (B.R. Cant & Sons), 1918
- 'Snowflake', (Frank Cant), 1922
- 'Captain F.S. Harvey-Cant' (Frank Cant), 1924
- 'Memory', (B.R. Cant & Sons), 1932
- 'English Miss', 1977
- 'Just Joey', (Cants of Colchester), 1972
- 'English Miss', (Cants of Colchester), 1977
- 'St. Helena', (Cants of Colchester), 1983
- 'Alpine Sunset', (Cants of Colchester), 1973
- 'Abbaye de Clune', (Cants of Colchester), 1995

== Rose gallery ==
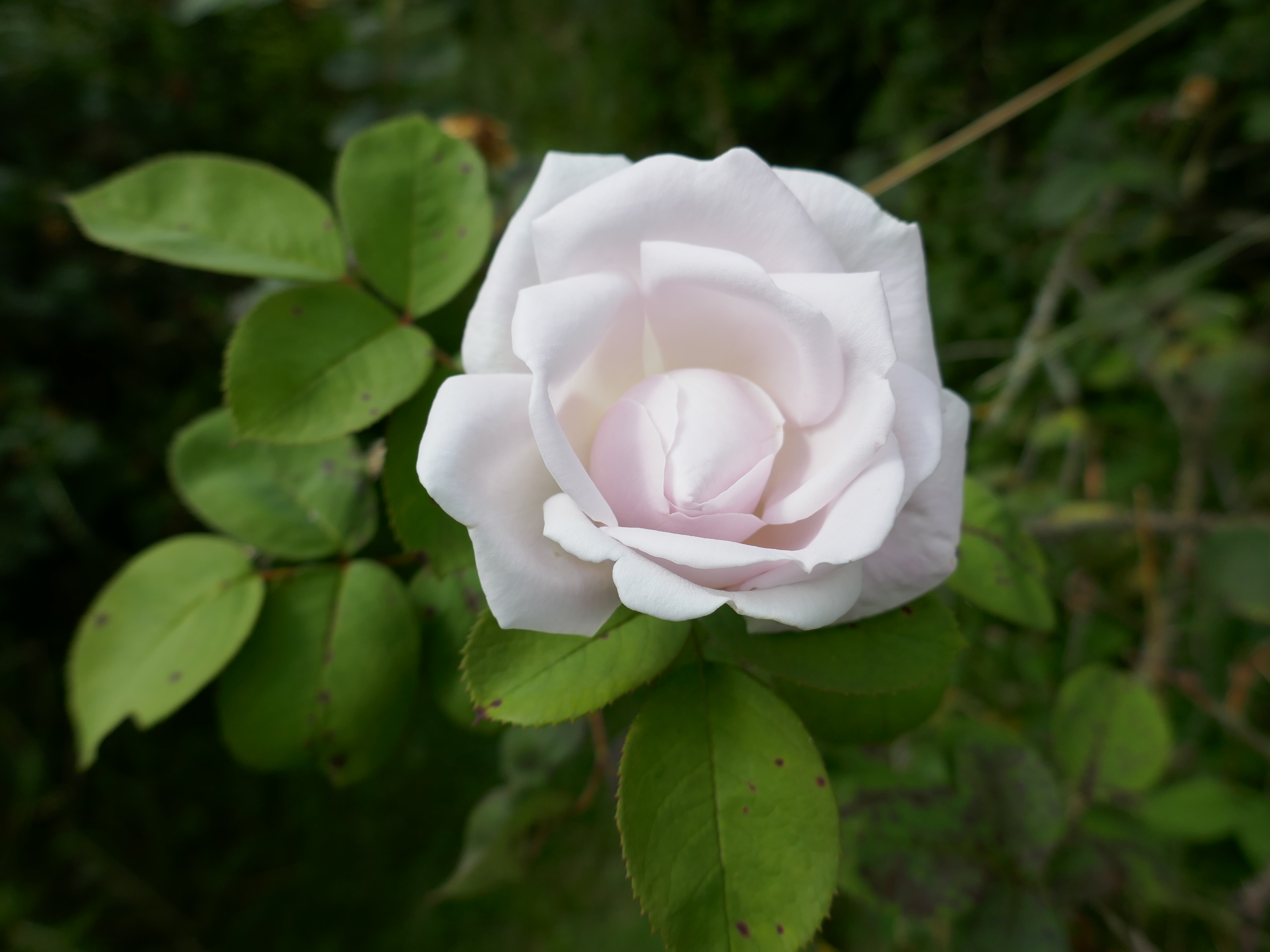
'Ben Cant', 1901

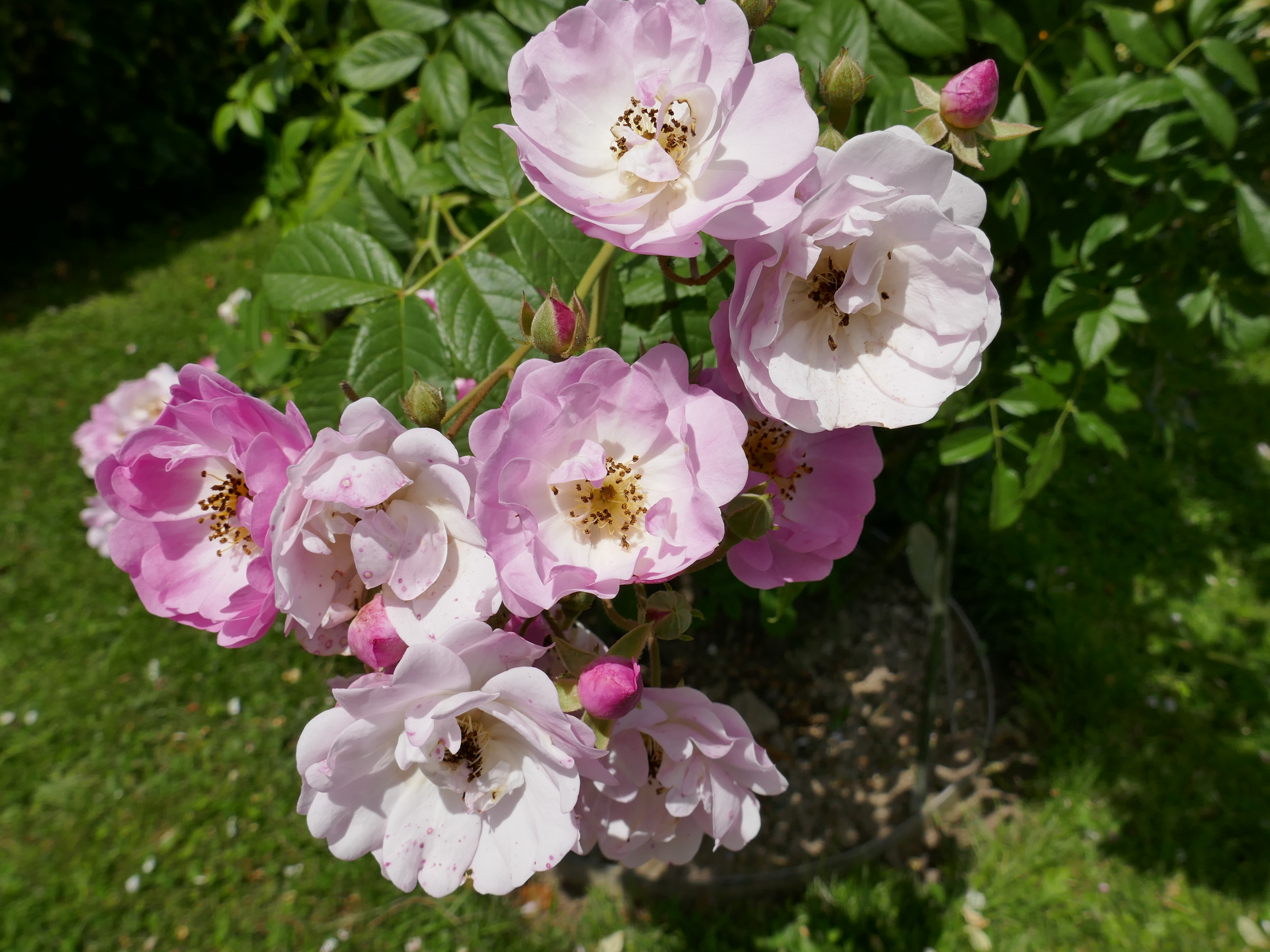
'Blush rambler', 1903

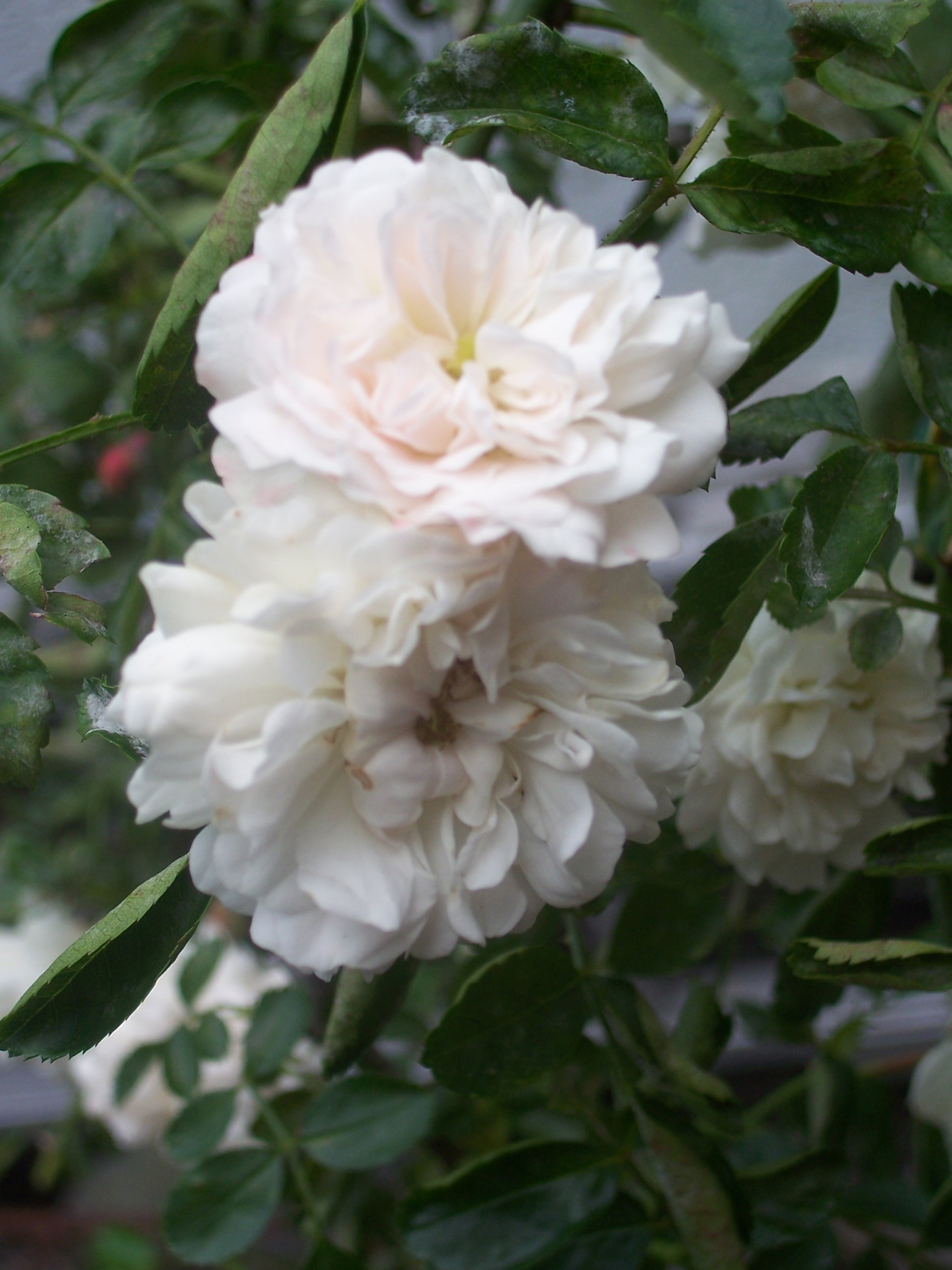
'White Dorothy', 1908

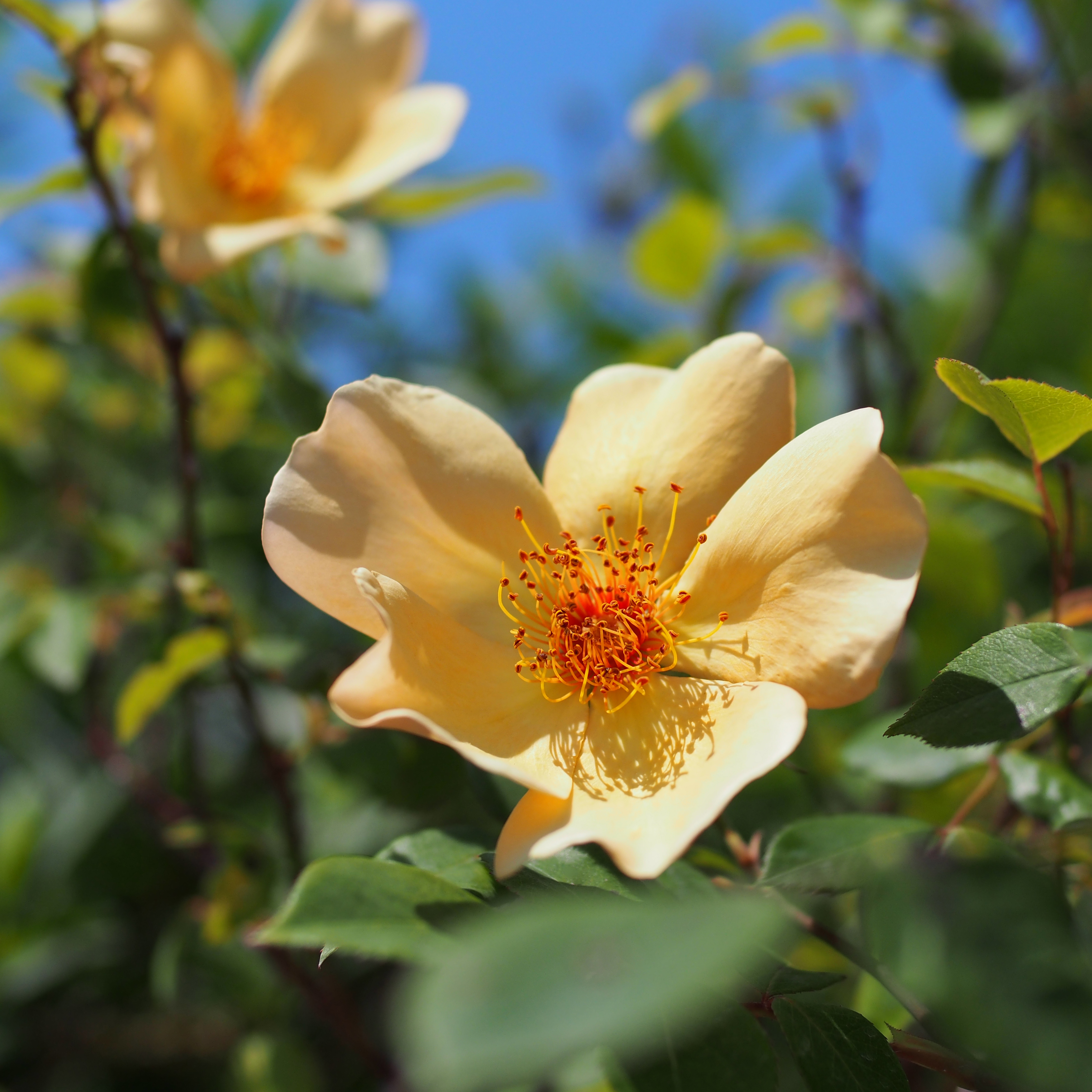
'Mrs. Oakley-Fisher', 1921

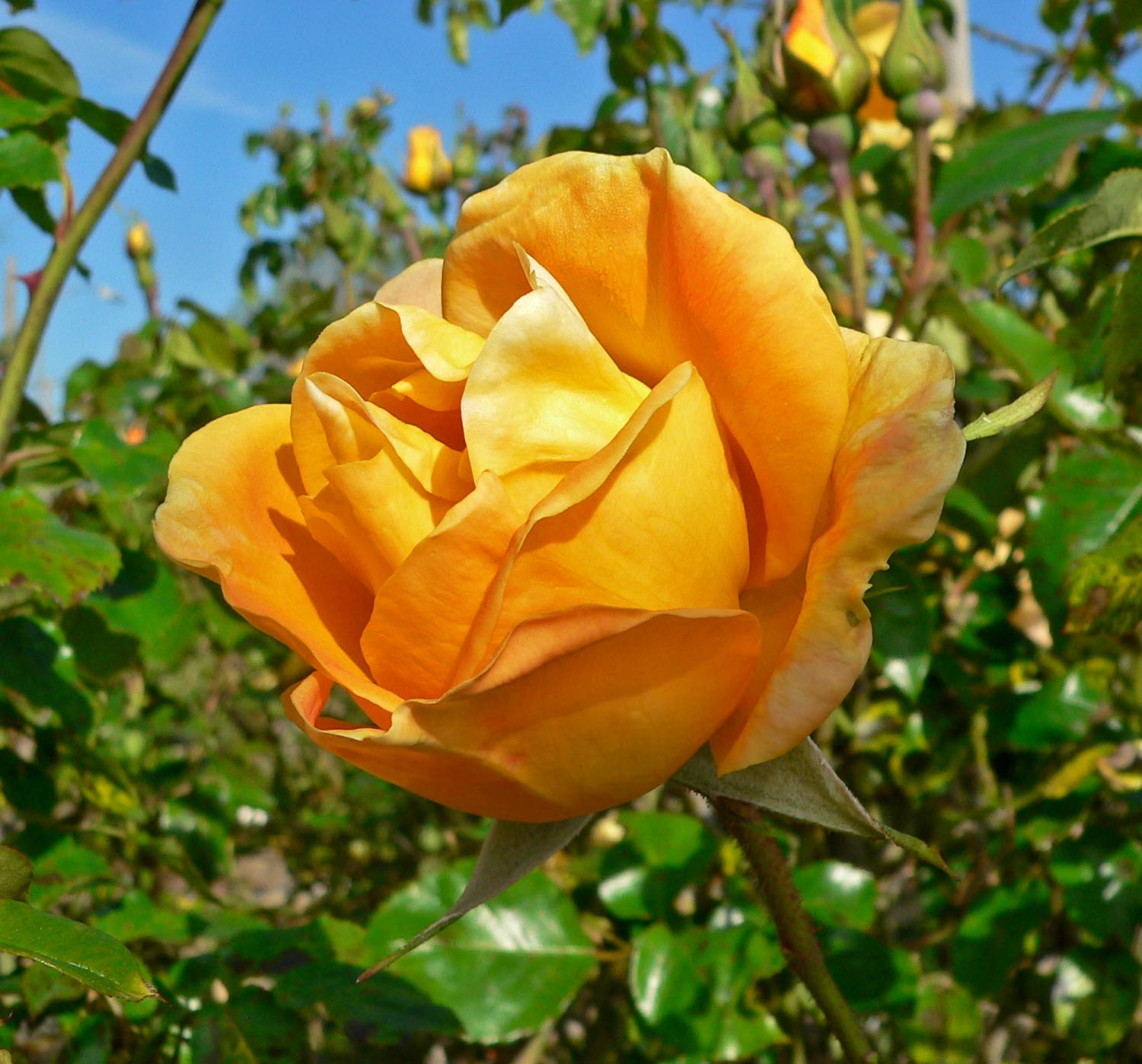
'Lady Forteviot', 1926

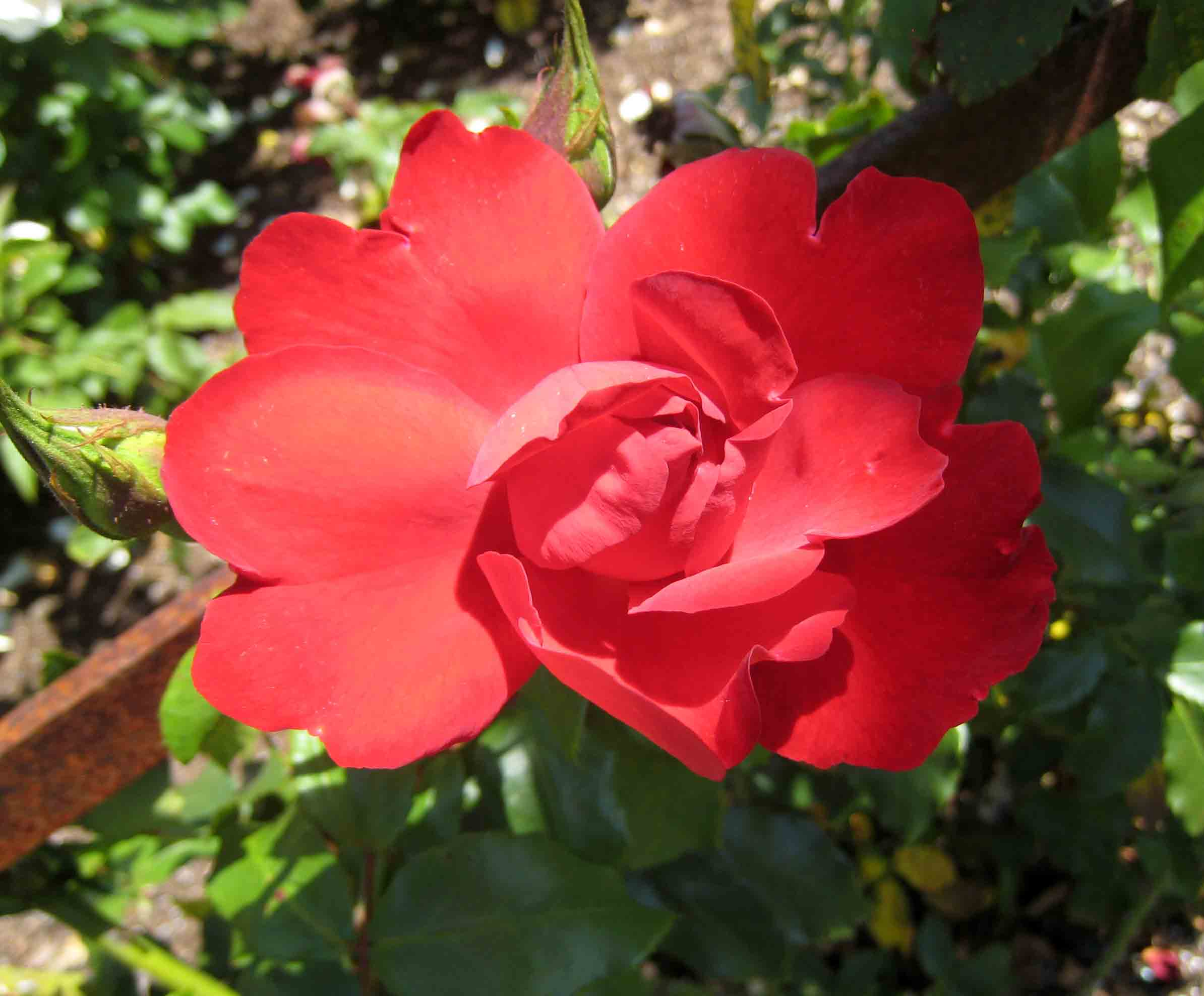
'Crimson Descant', 1972

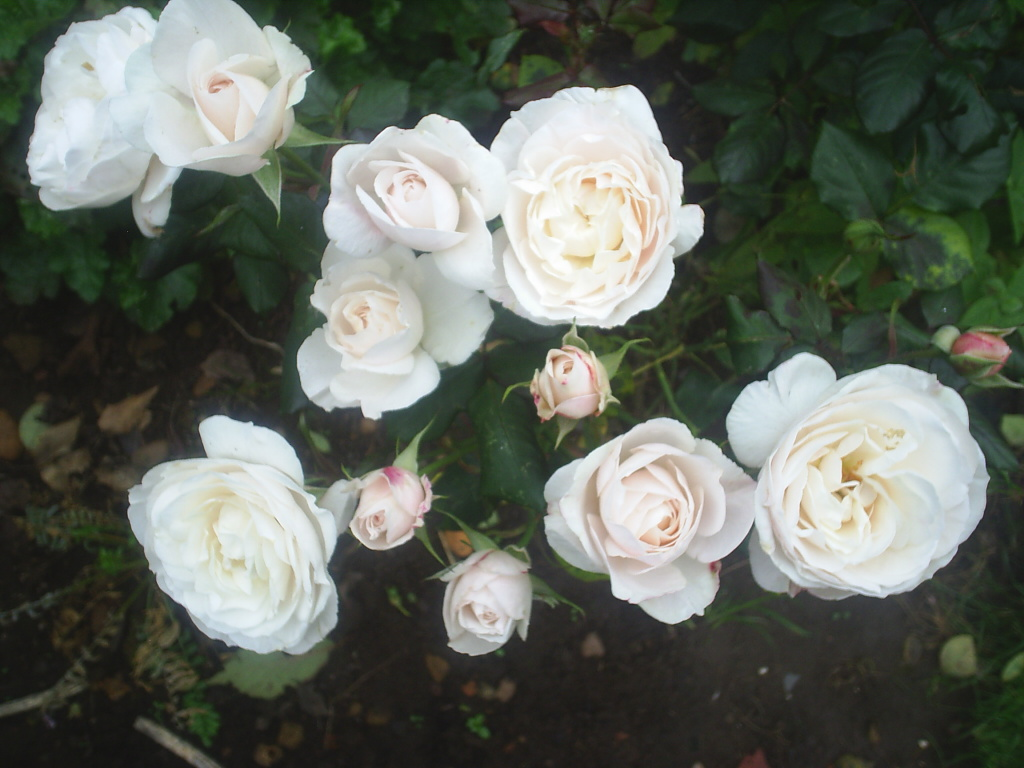
'English Miss', 1977

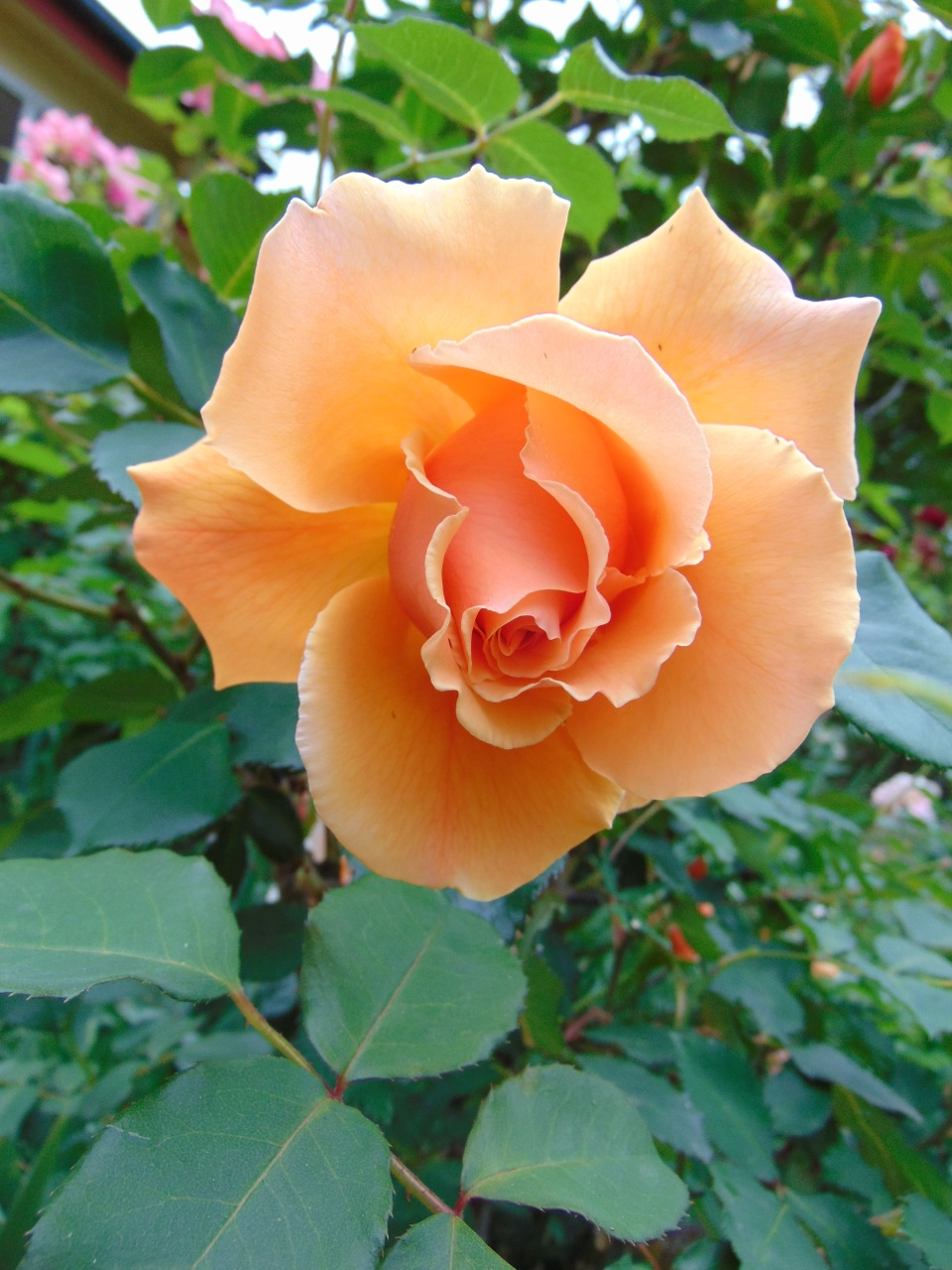
'Just Joey', 1972

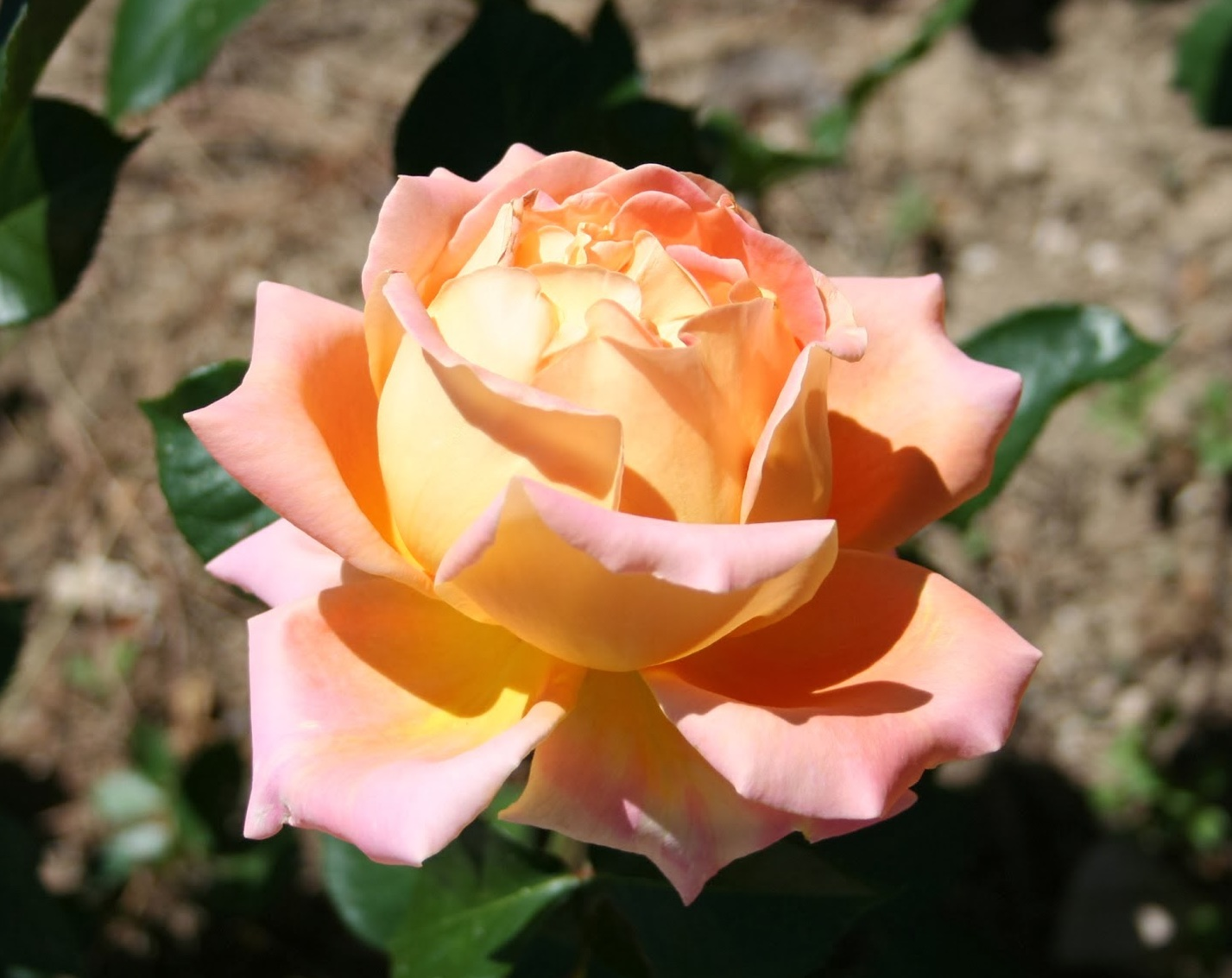
'Alpine Sunset'

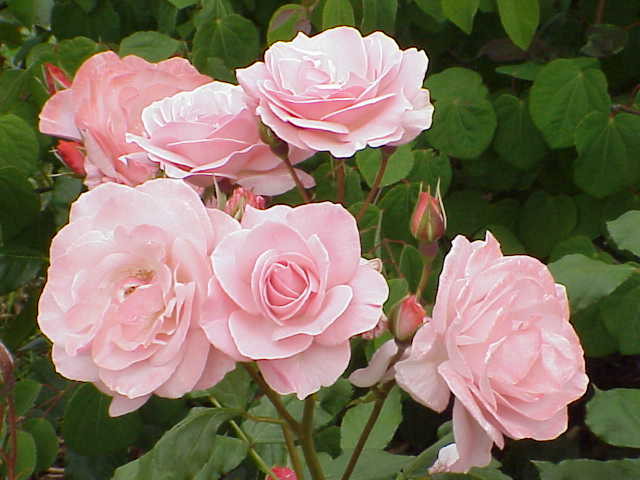
'St. Helena', 1983

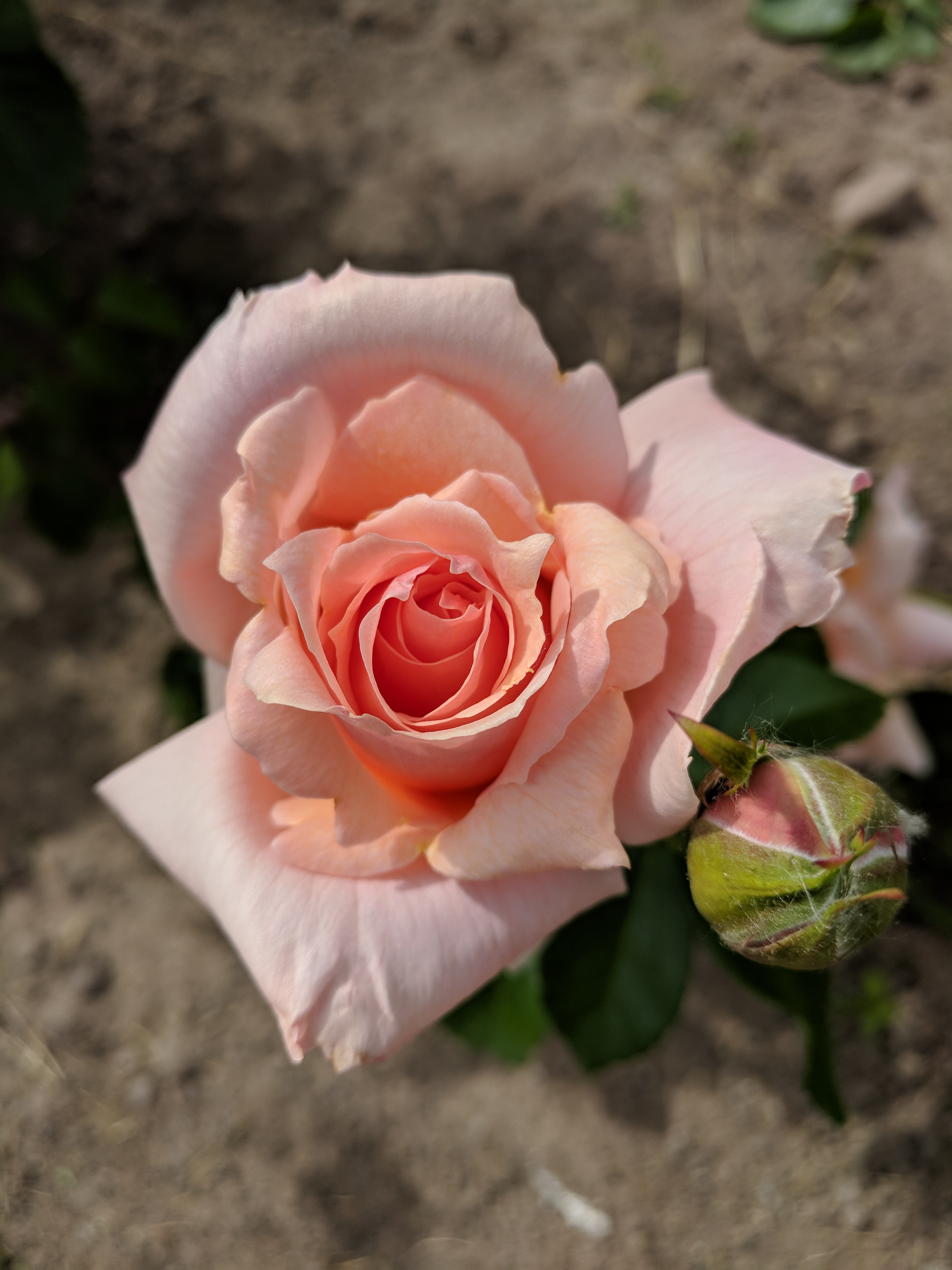
'Apricot Candy', 2006
