= Rosa 'Just Joey' =

Rose cultivar

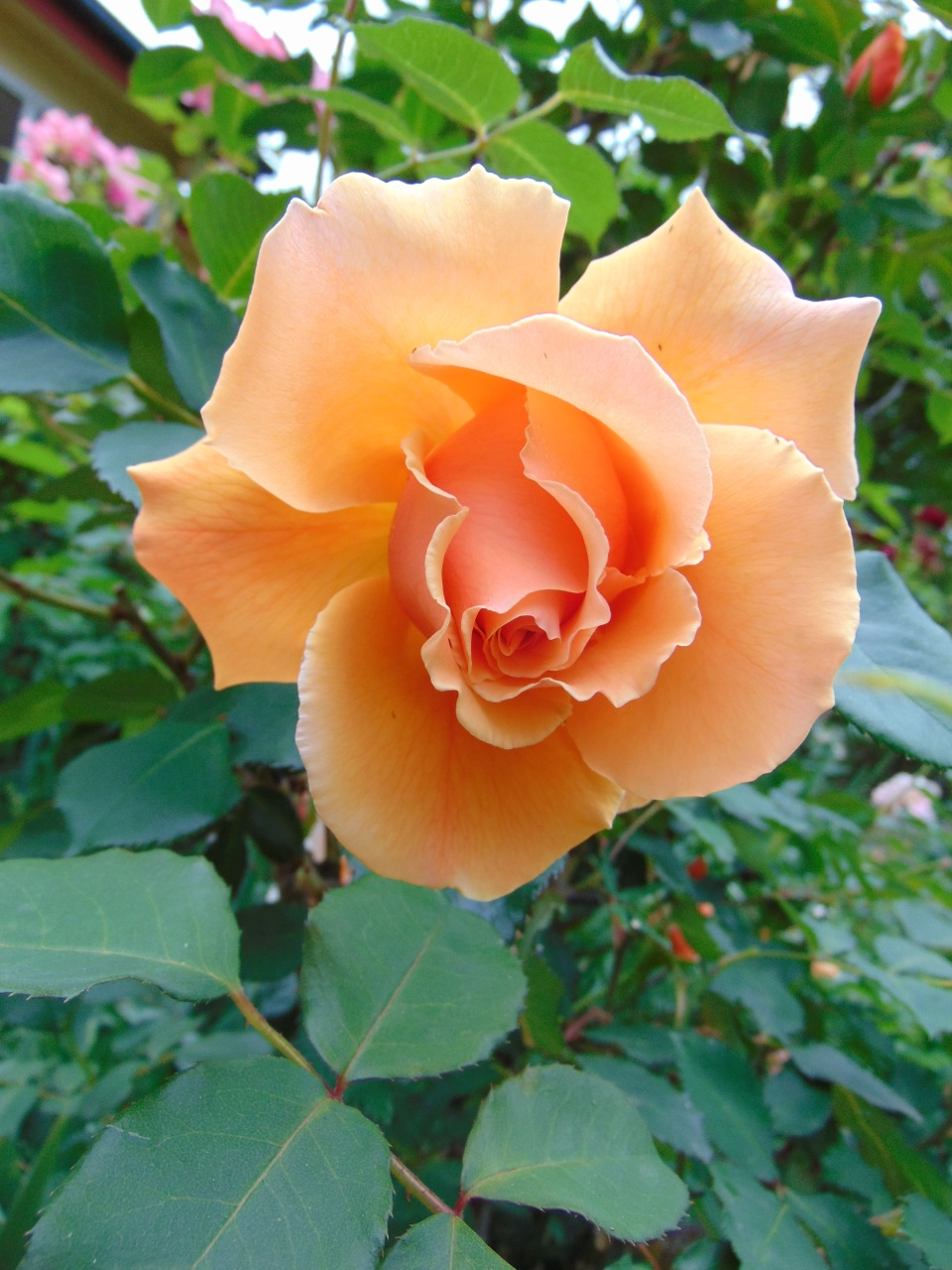
- Rosa 'Just Joey'
- Genus: Rosa hybrid
- Hybrid parentage: 'Fragrant Cloud' x 'Dr. A.J. Verhage'
- Cultivar group: Hybrid tea
- Cultivar: CANjujo
- Breeder: Pawsey
- Origin: United Kingdom, 1972

Rosa 'Just Joey', (a.k.a. CANjujo), is an apricot blend hybrid tea rose cultivar, bred by Roger Pawsey and named in honor of his wife, Joey. The plant was introduced into the United Kingdom by Cants of Colchester rose growers in 1972. 'Just Joey' was inducted into the Rose Hall of Fame as "World's Favourite Rose" in 1994.

== History ==
Cants of Colchester, the oldest firm of commercial rose growers in Great Britain, was founded by Benjamin Cant in 1765. The nursery, Benjamin R Cant & Sons, was located in Mile End, now a northern suburb of Colchester. The firm originally sold a variety of plants, seeds, bulbs and trees. With the rise in popularity of roses in the mid-1800s, Benjamin R. Cant (1827–1900) initiated a rose breeding program at the nursery in 1875. By 1880, Cant had become a very successful rose exhibitor in England.

Cant's nephew, Frank Cant (1857–1928), left the family business to establish his own nursery in Colchester in the early 1880s. The two Cant families became fierce competitors. The rivalry between the two nurseries lasted until the 1960s, when their descendants decided to merge the two family businesses into one company. The 'Benjamin R Cant & Sons' of Mile End Colchester and 'Frank Cant & Company' of Stanway, Essex became the 'Cants of Colchester' under the leadership of Cant family descendant, Roger Pawsey. Cants of Colchester has introduced several popular rose varieties, including Rosa 'English Miss', Rosa 'Alpine Sunset' and Rosa 'Goldstar'.

The great strength of 'Just Joey' is its beauty at all stages of its development, whether as an elegantly unfurling bud or as a fully expanded flower with large, substantial, wavy petals delectably arranged around its crimson stamens. It makes one of the most spectacular and floriferous displays of all roses, with some of the largest flowers.

— Quest-Ritson, 2011.

'Just Joey' was bred by Roger Pawsey and named in honor of his wife, Joey. The cultivar was created from parent hybrid tea roses, 'Fragrant Cloud' and 'Dr. A.J. Verhage'. The plant was introduced into the United Kingdom in 1972. 'Just Joey' was used to hybridize the following plants: Rosa 'Abbaye de Cluny', (1995), Rosa 'Apricot Candy', (2006), Rosa 'Bronze Star', (2000). 'Just Joey' was inducted into the Rose Hall of Fame as "World's Favourite Rose" in 1994.

== Description ==
'Just Joey' is a tall, upright shrub, 5 to 6 ft (152–182 cm) in height with a 3 to 4 ft (90–121 cm) spread. Blooms are large, 4—5 in (10–12 cm) in diameter, with 26 to 40 petals. Flowers are borne mostly solitary or in small clusters, and bloom form is slightly ruffled. The flowers are a creamy orange or apricot color, with shades of dark copper. All petals eventually fade to cream. The rose has a strong, sweet fragrance and medium, glossy, leathery foliage. Bloom color is richest in cool weather. 'Just Joey' blooms in flushes from spring through fall. The plant does well in USDA zone 7b to 10b.

== Awards ==
- Rose Hall of Fame, (1994)

== See also ==
- Garden roses
- Rose Hall of Fame
- List of Award of Garden Merit roses

== Bibliography ==
- Quest-Ritson, Brigid; Quest-Ritson, Charles (2011). Encyclopedia of Roses (Reprint ed.). DK. ISBN 978-0756688684.
