= Alderman Blaxill School =

Location
- Paxman Avenue; Colchester, Essex, C02 9DQ; England; 51.872984°N 0.868431°E

Information
- Type: Academy
- Established: 1920
- Closed: 2014
- Department for Education URN: 115380 Tables
- Ofsted: Reports
- Gender: Coeducational
- Age: 11 to 16
- Website: http://blaxill.net/Index.html

Alderman Blaxill School was a secondary school with academy status in Colchester, Essex, and was the town's smallest secondary school. It closed in 2014.

== History ==
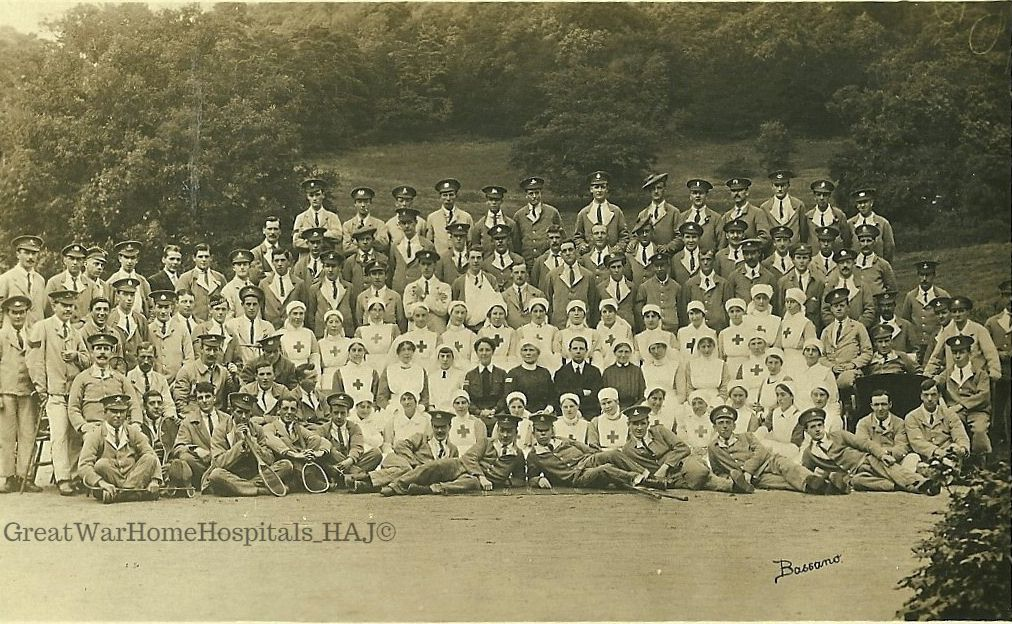
The military hospital in World War I

Alderman Blaxill Secondary Modern School in Walnut Tree Way, Colchester, was opened in 1955. It replaced the former Hamilton Road Central School (built in 1914, but used as a military hospital during World War I, not opening as a school until 1920. Following the Education Act 1944, it became a secondary modern school. In 1955, the secondary part of the school moved to the new building in Walnut Tree Way, Shrub End, and was renamed Alderman Blaxill after a former Mayor of Colchester and chairman of the education committee. The Hamilton Road building was used for infants and juniors. In 1976, Alderman Blaxill became a comprehensive school. It became an academy in 2012, and closed in 2014. The majority of the students transferred to The Stanway School and Thomas Lord Audley School, with which Alderman Blaxill was federated.

== Legacy ==
Following the closure of the school in July 2014, the buildings were maintained for temporary use by children from the Market Field School in Elmstead Market, which was being rebuilt at the time. Demolition of the school commenced in October 2017.

== See also ==
- Secondary schools in Essex
