= Thomas Lord Audley School =

Coordinates: 51.8683°N 0.9027°E

Location
- Monkwick Avenue; Monkwick; Colchester, Essex, CO2 8NJ; England

Information
- Type: Academy
- Established: 1958
- Trust: The Stanway Federation Academy Trust
- Department for Education URN: 137937 Tables
- Ofsted: Reports
- Head teacher: Simon Essex
- Gender: Mixed
- Age: 11 to 16
- Enrolment: Approx. 750 as of January 2015
- Capacity: 1050
- Colour: Blue
- Website: https://www.tla.essex.sch.uk/

Thomas Lord Audley School is a mixed 11–16 secondary school with academy status for 800 pupils, to the south of Colchester, Essex. It serves a wide catchment area, taking students from the edge of Colchester, small villages (such as Rowhedge and Fingringhoe) and the community of Mersea Island. The school building is modern, with single, double and three-storey accommodation with hard play areas and a playing field. There are six science laboratories and six technology Suites. The PE facilities include a sports hall, fitness suite and gym. As of 2009, the school also has new drama and music facilities and a new suite of modern language rooms.

The school is federated with The Stanway School.

== History ==
Originally Monkwick Secondary Modern School, which opened in 1958, when classes from Wilson Marriage school moved to Greyfriars, East Hill. It moved in 1960 to new buildings in Monkwick Avenue, which were enlarged in 1974 and in 1979. In 1975 it became a comprehensive school and was renamed Thomas Lord Audley School.

It is named after Thomas Audley, 1st Baron Audley of Walden, (1488-1544) who was Town clerk of Colchester; later he was Speaker of the House of Commons and Lord Chancellor to King Henry VIII of England. He built the first house at Audley End.

In 2008, there was a proposal by Essex County Council to merge the school with Alderman Blaxill School in a new Academy, but the idea was abandoned after a vigorous campaign led by Bob Russell, the then MP for Colchester.

The school was previously a Language College before converting to academy status.

== See also ==
- List of schools in Essex
