= Rosa 'Emily Gray' =

Rose cultivar

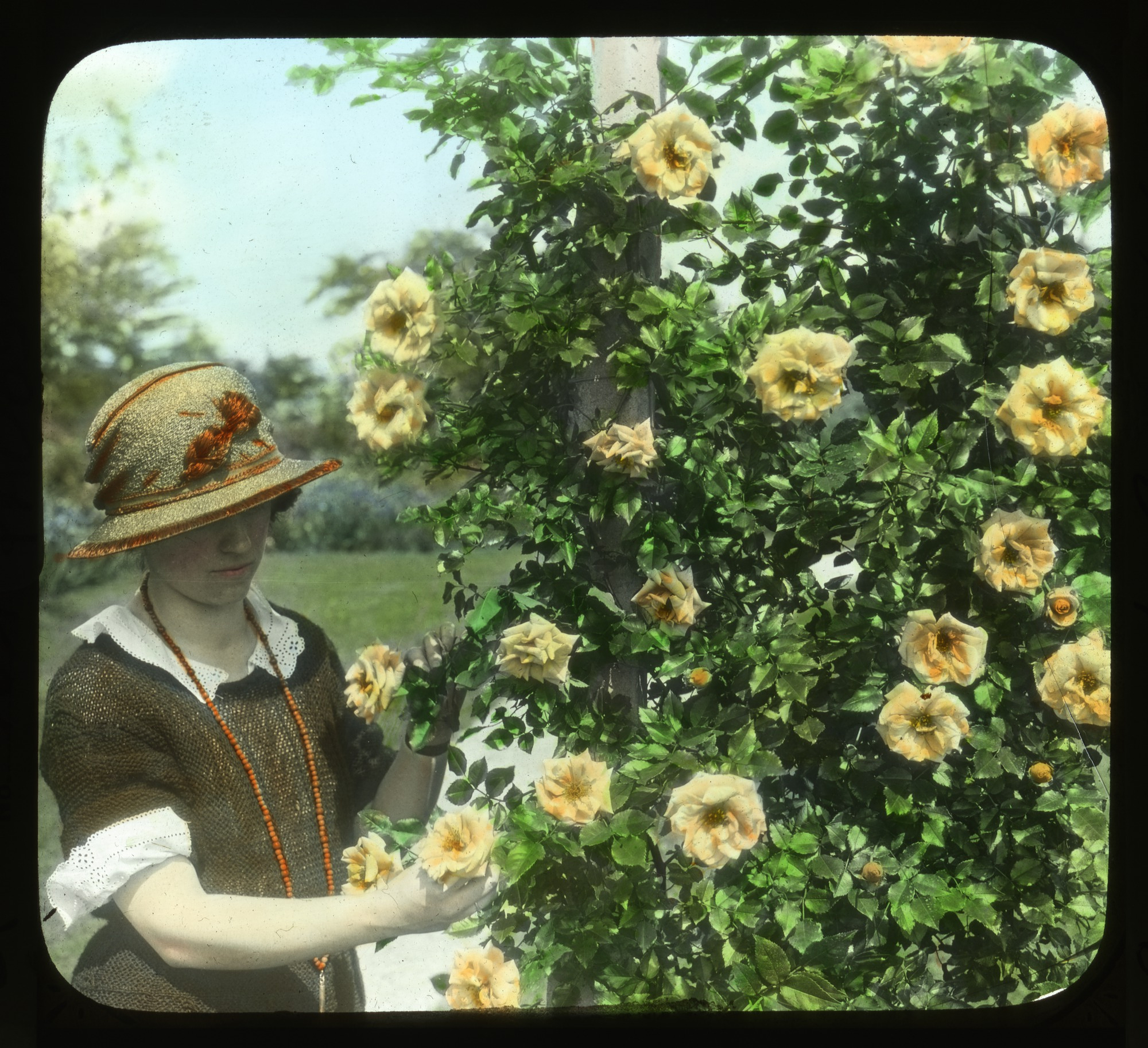
- Rosa 'Emily Gray'
- Genus: Rosa hybrid
- Hybrid parentage: 'Jersey Beauty' × 'Comtesse du Cayla'
- Cultivar group: Hybrid wichurana
- Breeder: A. H. Williams
- Origin: United Kingdom, 1916

Rosa 'Emily Gray' is an apricot-blend Hybrid Wichurana rambler rose, bred by Dr. A.H. Williams in 1916 and named after his sister, Emily Gray. It was introduced commercially by Benjamin R. Cant & Sons in the United Kingdom in 1918 and in Australia by Hazlewood Bros. Pty. Ltd before 1921. It is known for its vigorous climbing habit, fragrant apricot-to-golden flowers, and glossy bronze-green foliage.

== Description ==
‘Emily Gray’ is a vigorous Hybrid Wichurana rambler with a tall, climbing habit, typically reaching 14–16 ft (4.3–4.9 m) in height with a spread of up to 10 ft (3.0 m). It produces long, flexible canes bearing abundant, glossy foliage. The leaves emerge bronze or purple–tinted before maturing to a dark bronze-green or deep glossy green, and are complemented by distinctive crimson leaf stalks.

The medium to large, semi-double flowers average about 3.5 in (9 cm) in diameter and have 17–25 petals. They are borne early in the season in small clusters, typically of three to five blooms, on long stems. The flowers open with a cupped form before gradually flattening as they mature. The flower colour changes as the blooms mature, opening in shades of apricot, deep fawn, or golden yellow with salmon tones before fading to softer golden yellow and buff. The blooms are lightly to moderately fragrant with a distinctive tea scent.

The plant is vigorous and generally disease resistant. Like most Hybrid Wichurana ramblers, it flowers only once each season, producing a profuse display in late spring or early summer. Mature plants may become almost completely covered with blossoms during peak blooms. Once established, the plant requires relatively little pruning. Although not especially hardy in colder climates, it can be successfully overwintered with winter protection.

== Cultivation ==
‘Emily Gray’ is typically grown as a rambler over walls, pergolas, arches, and mature trees, where its long, flexible canes can be trained to advantage. Because it flowers on wood produced the previous season, pruning is generally carried out immediately after flowering. The cultivar performs best in full sun and well-drained soil.

== History ==
'Emily Gray' was developed by Dr. A. H. Williams in the United Kingdom and introduced by Benjamin R. Cants & Sons (Cants of Colchester), one of Britain’s oldest commercial rose nurseries, in 1918. The cultivar was named for the breeder's sister, Emily Gray née Williams, who had moved to New Zealand with her husband, Charles Gray. The cultivar was introduced in Australia by Hazlewood Bros. Pty. Ltd. before 1921 as 'Emily Gray'. ‘Emily Gray’ received both the National Rose Society Gold Medal and the Cory Cup in recognition of its outstanding garden qualities in 1916.

Dr. Alfred Henry Williams (1864–1939) was a prominent British amateur hybridizer and President of the National Rose Society from 1933 to 1934. He specialized in breeding vigorous Hybrid Wichurana ramblers. Among his best-known cultivars are Rosa ‘Emily Gray’ (1916), prized for its glossy bronze-green foliage and tea fragrance, and Rosa ‘Blushing Lucy’ (1936) a light pink climbing rose named for his wife, Lucy.
