= The Stanway School =

Location
- Winstree Road; Stanway, Essex, CO6 3LH; England; 51°53′00″N 0°50′26″E

Information
- Type: Academy
- Established: 1956
- Department for Education URN: 137927 Tables
- Ofsted: Reports
- Gender: Mixed
- Age: 11 to 16
- Houses: Gainsborough, Rutherford, Shakespeare, Wellington, Nightingale
- Publication: The Stanway Times
- Website: https://www.stanway.essex.sch.uk/

The Stanway School is a mixed secondary school in Stanway in Essex, England. It was converted to academy status in May 2013, and used to be a community school under the direct control of Essex County Council. The school continues to coordinate with Essex County Council for admissions.

The Stanway School offers the General Certificate of Secondary Education (GCSEs), Business and Technology Education Council (BTECs) and OCR Nationals as programmes of study for pupils. The school has a Humanities, Maths & Computing specialism, and offers additional courses in these subjects.

The school is part of the Stanway Federation Academy Trust with the Thomas Lord Audley School and is also part of the Sigma Trust. The Stanway School is the subject of the 2024 docuseries Swiped: The Schools That Banned Smartphones.

== Notable former pupils ==
- Damon Albarn, musician and singer-songwriter of the bands Blur and Gorillaz
- Graham Coxon, musician and guitarist of the band Blur
- Natalie Jones, paralympic swimmer
- Adam Miller, former footballer
- Sammie Szmodics, footballer
