= Swiped: The School That Banned Smartphones =

2024 British docuseries

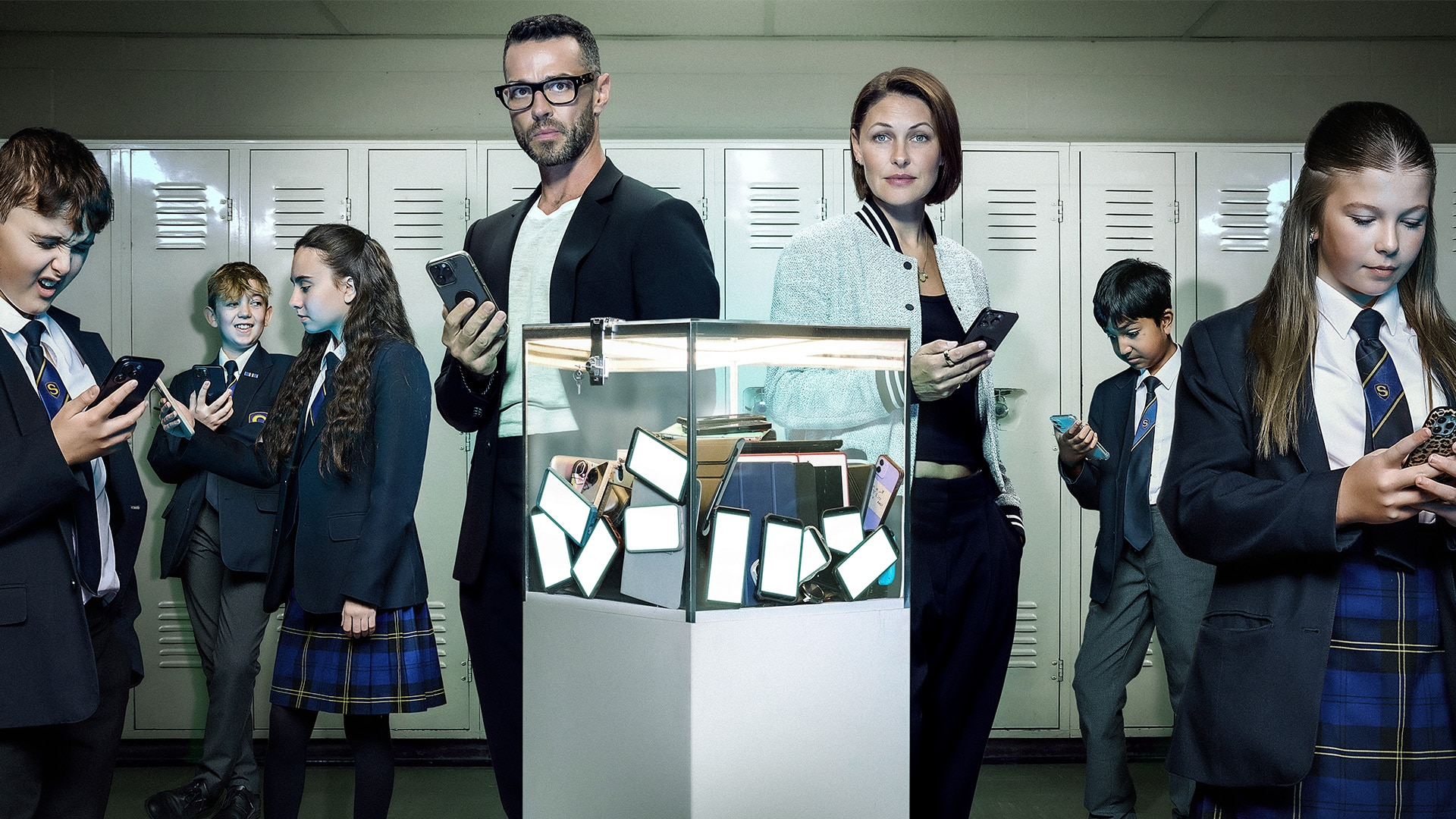
- Genre: Documentary
- Starring: Emma Willis; Matt Willis; The Stanway School
- Country of origin: United Kingdom
- Original language: English
- No. of episodes: 2

Production
- Production location: The Stanway School
- Running time: 47 minutes (approx.)
- Production company: Boldprint Studios

Original release
- Network: Channel 4
- Release: 11 December – 12 December 2024

Swiped: The School That Banned Smartphones is a British two-part docuseries that follows pupils at The Stanway School in Colchester who suffer from problematic smartphone use and social media addiction. Emma and Matt Willis follow the pupils' time away from screens as their smartphones are seized for 21 days.

== Release ==
The first episode was first aired on Channel 4 on 11 December 2024, with both episodes being released on Channel 4 Online on the same day. The second, and last episode, aired the following day, on 12 December 2024. A compilation of both episodes, totalling a runtime of 1 hour and 33 minutes, was uploaded on the Channel 4 YouTube channel on 18 December 2024.

== See also ==
- Problematic smartphone use
- Problematic social media use
