= Stanway, Essex =

Village in Essex, England

Coordinates: 51.8817°N 0.8173°E

Stanway
- Suburb & Civil Parish
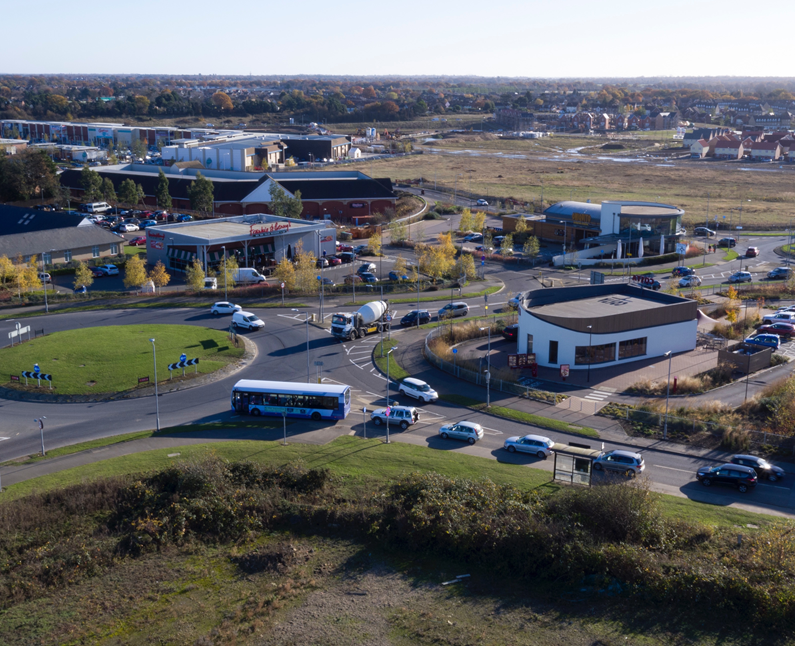
- Stanway Business & Shopping District

- Location within Essex
- Population: 12,298 (Parish, 2021)
- OS grid reference: TL940241
- Civil parish: Stanway
- Metropolitan borough: City of Colchester
- District: Colchester
- Shire county: Essex
- Region: East
- Country: England
- Sovereign state: United Kingdom
- Post town: Colchester
- Postcode district: CO3
- Dialling code: 01206
- Police: Essex
- Fire: Essex
- Ambulance: East of England
- UK Parliament: Witham

Stanway is a civil parish in the City of Colchester district of Essex, England. Stanway was historically a village, but is now effectively a western suburb of Colchester; it is classed as part of the Colchester built up area by the Office of National Statistics. 'Stanway' is an Anglo-Saxon name for the 'stone way' of the Roman road, now the A12. At the 2021 census the parish had a population of 12,298.

Stanway is about 3 miles (5 km) west of Colchester city centre on the B1408 (former A12), near the junction of the A12 and the A1124 at Eight Ash Green. Colchester Zoo, The Stanway School.

Graham Coxon and Damon Albarn, founder members of Blur, met at the local school, The Stanway School.

The TV mini-series Swiped: The School That Banned Smartphones was filmed in Stanway.

Stanway is mentioned in the Domesday Book of 1086.

The £4.3m A12 bypass opened in 1971. Local pubs include the Princess Charlotte (the first pub in the UK to be named after Princess Charlotte of Wales), the Swan Inn on London Road, and Live and Let Live on Millers Lane.

There are five schools – three primary schools, Lexden Springs School and The Stanway School which has academy status, and describes itself as a "Humanities and Maths & Computing College". Four of the five schools are close together, on adjacent roads with the third primary behind the Tollgate shopping centre.

A shopping district comprising The Tollgate Centre and Stane Park occupies an area close to the A12, these centres are home to national retailers such as B&Q, Sainsbury’s, Next and Marks & Spencer (having closed its city centre store in 2022). Further shops and businesses such as the Co-op, Halfords and Hatfields occupy the Peartree road area.

== Governance ==
An electoral ward with the same name exists. The population of this ward at the 2011 census was 8,283.

Since 2010, Stanway has been a part of the Witham constituency. Previously, it had fallen within the Colchester constituency.

== Business District ==
A major studio and filming facility, owned by iSite, is located in the business district of Stanway.

== Parish church ==
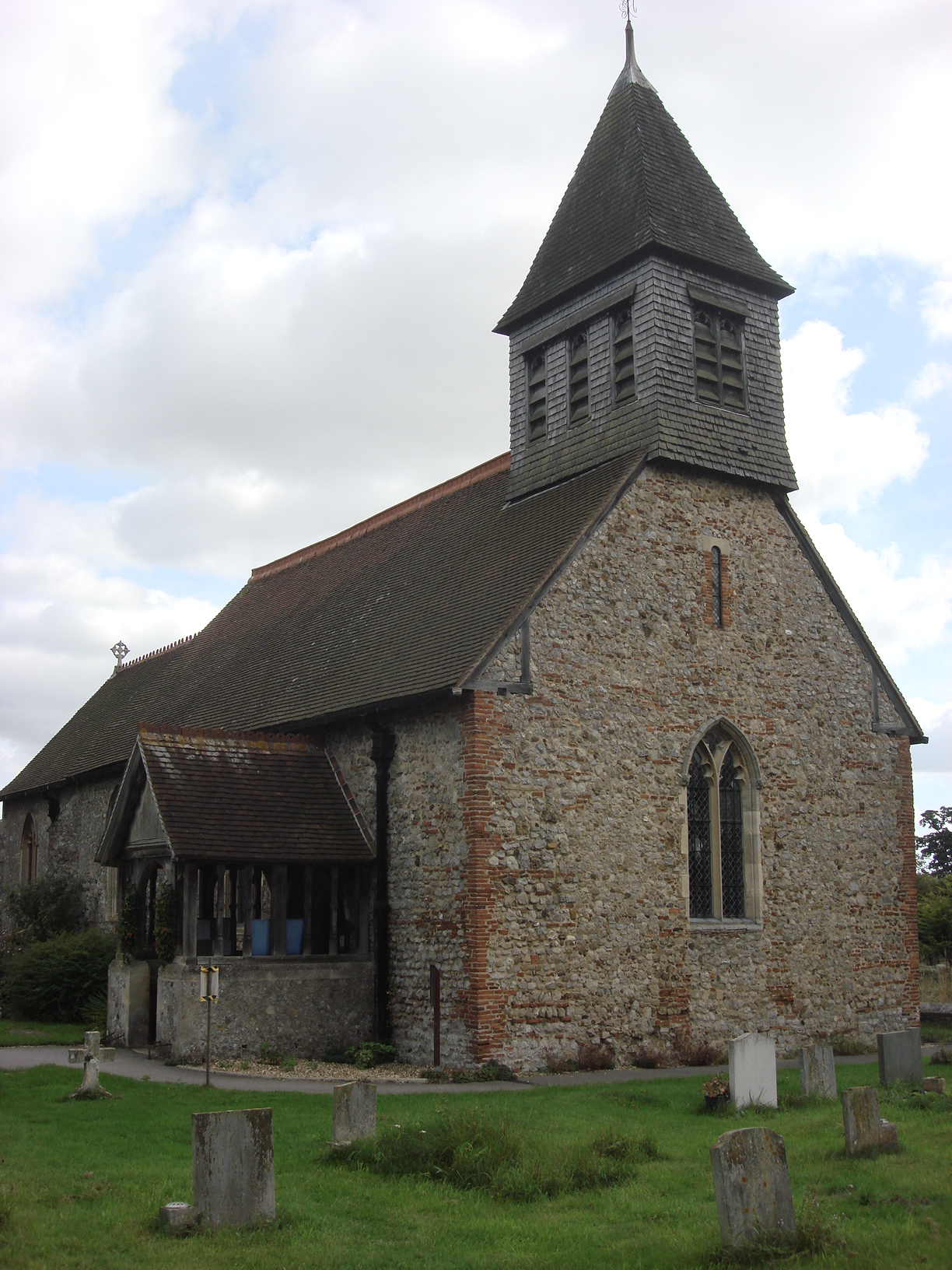
The ancient parish church of St Albright, Stanway

In the early Middle Ages Stanway had two churches; All Saints' next to Stanway Hall, and St Albright's in Little Stanway on the London Road (now the B1408). All Saints' church, first recorded in about 1260, had fallen out of use during the 16th century, but was repaired and the chancel and north aisle were demolished in about 1605 by Sir John Swinterton, when it became the private chapel to Stanway Hall. In the early 18th century the church was said to be "utterly decayed" and remains a ruin.

The current Church of England parish church is dedicated to Saint Albright, who is generally identified with Saint Ethelbert the King, a king of the Anglo-Saxon kingdom of East Anglia, who was killed in 794 AD. It was in existence in the late 11th century and was a parish church soon afterwards but was referred to as a chapel in later documents. The oldest parts of the present building date from the 12th century and incorporate Roman bricks in the heads of some of the windows. A new chancel was added in 1880 when the church was restored by George Gilbert Scott.

== Druid of Colchester ==
In 1996, before the expansion of the Stanway sand and gravel quarry, an archaeological team was called in to investigate the outline of five ancient ditched enclosures identified by aerial photography. There, just off the A12 to Colchester, they discovered the grave of the "Druid of Colchester".

== Sport and leisure ==
Stanway has a non-League football club Stanway Rovers F.C. who play at New Farm Road.
