= Myland =

Civil parish in Essex, England

Coordinates: 51.90628°N 0.8969°E

Myland (Mile End)
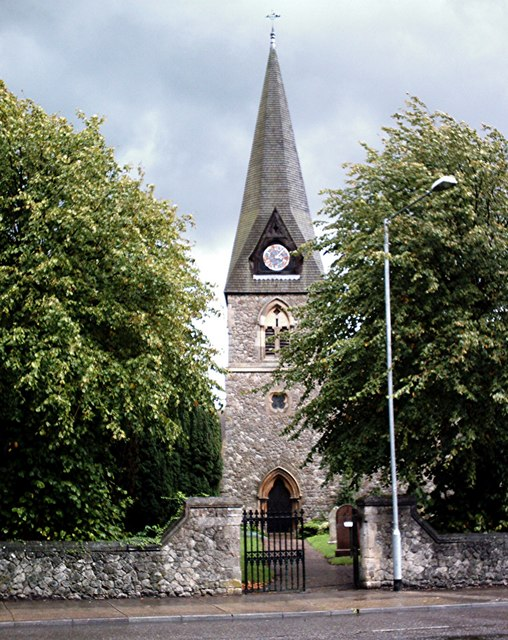
- St. Michael's church, Myland

- Location within Essex
- Population: 18,094 (Parish, 2021)
- OS grid reference: TL995275
- Civil parish: Myland
- District: Colchester
- Shire county: Essex
- Region: East
- Country: England
- Sovereign state: United Kingdom
- Post town: COLCHESTER
- Postcode district: CO4
- Police: Essex
- Fire: Essex
- Ambulance: East of England

Myland (also called Mile End) is a civil parish in the City of Colchester district of Essex, England. It is a northern suburb of the built up area of Colchester itself. The original village began approximately one mile north of the centre of Colchester which probably accounts for its name. This has varied over the centuries but essentially with the same meaning. At the 2021 census the parish had a population of 18,094.

== Geography ==
Myland rises from about 19 metres in the south to about 50 metres in the north. It is within 30 minutes driving time of Sudbury and Ipswich.

The parish has two public houses, 'The Bricklayers' and 'The Dog and Pheasant', as well as three churches or chapels. These are St Michael's Parish Church (Church of England), a Methodist chapel and a Catholic church. There are three primary schools: Myland Community Primary School (in Mill Road), Queen Boudica Primary School (off Turner Road) and Camulos Academy (off Via Urbis Romanae). There is also a new secondary school, The Trinity School, which opened in September 2023. Both Colchester General Hospital and the private Oaks Hospital are to be found in the parish.

== History ==
The earliest record of the original village is from 1254 when Mile End, also known as Mile End St Michael, became a separate ecclesiastical parish. In the English Civil War, Colonel Fothergill's fort, a major Roundhead stronghold was located in the village. Daniel Defoe held a long lease on Tubswick, an ancient house in the village which burned down on 7 December 2009. He is said to have leased Tubswick for his daughter. His book "Moll Flanders" mentions Mile End.

The parish of Mile End St Michael was one of the 16 parishes which made up the ancient borough of Colchester, four of which (Berechurch, Lexden, Greenstead, and Myland or Mile End St Michael) were classed as "outlying parishes", covering areas that were more peripheral or suburban to the main part of the town as it then was. All the parishes within the borough were united into a single parish of Colchester matching the borough in 1897.

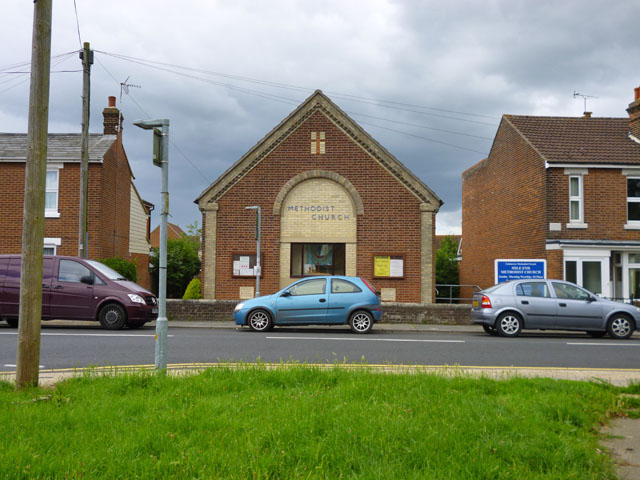
Well Methodist Church

The old borough and parish of Colchester were abolished in 1974 when the much larger modern Colchester borough (a city since 2022) was created. A new civil parish called Myland was created in 1999 covering the area, with its parish council taking the name Myland Community Council. Myland is the only part of the pre-1974 borough to be comprised in a civil parish. The community council meets at the Well Methodist Church Hall on Nayland Road.

The area has seen significant development in recent years. In 2013, planning permission was granted for 1,600 homes, a primary and secondary school, and shops at the former rose grower Cants of Colchester site. The former Severalls Hospital site was also redeveloped around the same time for 1,500 homes.

Despite its size, Myland has no community centre but does have two areas of playing fields, both of which are owned and maintained by Colchester City Council. To the west, Mile End Playing Fields offer facilities for football and cricket; while to the east, Mill Road Playing Fields are the former home of Colchester Rugby Club, with a 350-home housing development set to be built on the site.

Mile End was also home to Cants of Colchester, the oldest commercial rose growers in Great Britain, founded in 1765. The family-run nursery originally sold a variety of plants, seeds, bulbs and trees, until then-owner Benjamin Cant initiated a rose breeding programme in 1875 to cater for the increasing popularity of roses in the 1800s. By 1880, Cant had become a very successful rose exhibitor in England, with the firm becoming a household name in the horticulture industry, having introduced more than 130 new rose varieties since 1875. The business remained family-run from its 18th century inception until its closure in September 2023, with a 1,600 housing development built on the business' former rose growing fields.

== Sport and leisure ==
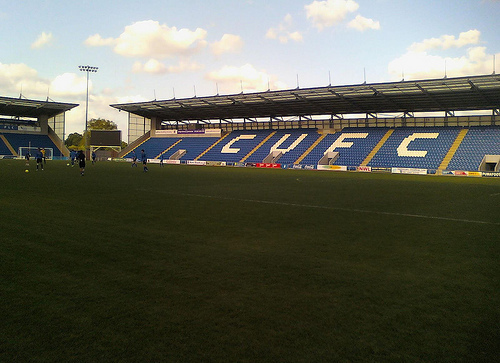
Colchester Community Stadium home ground of Colchester United

Colchester United F.C.'s ground, Colchester Community Stadium, is situated on former Cuckoo Farm land in the north of the parish. The stadium holds 10,105 spectators, and has been home to the club since 2008.

The stadium is located beside the Colchester Northern Gateway Leisure Park, a £65million development featuring a variety of restaurants, a bowling alley, indoor golf, climbing centre, cinema, and a hotel. The development spans 10-acres, with the first establishment opening in July 2023.

Colchester Sports Park is also located in Mile End, featuring 76-acres of both indoor and outdoor sporting facilities, including a cycle track, archery range, sports hall, gym, and both grass and artificial multi-use pitches. The facility opened in July 2021, and is also the home to both Colchester Rugby Club following their relocation from Mill Road Playing Fields, and Colchester & District Archery Club.
