= Rosa 'Lady Emma Hamilton' =

Orange shrub rose cultivar

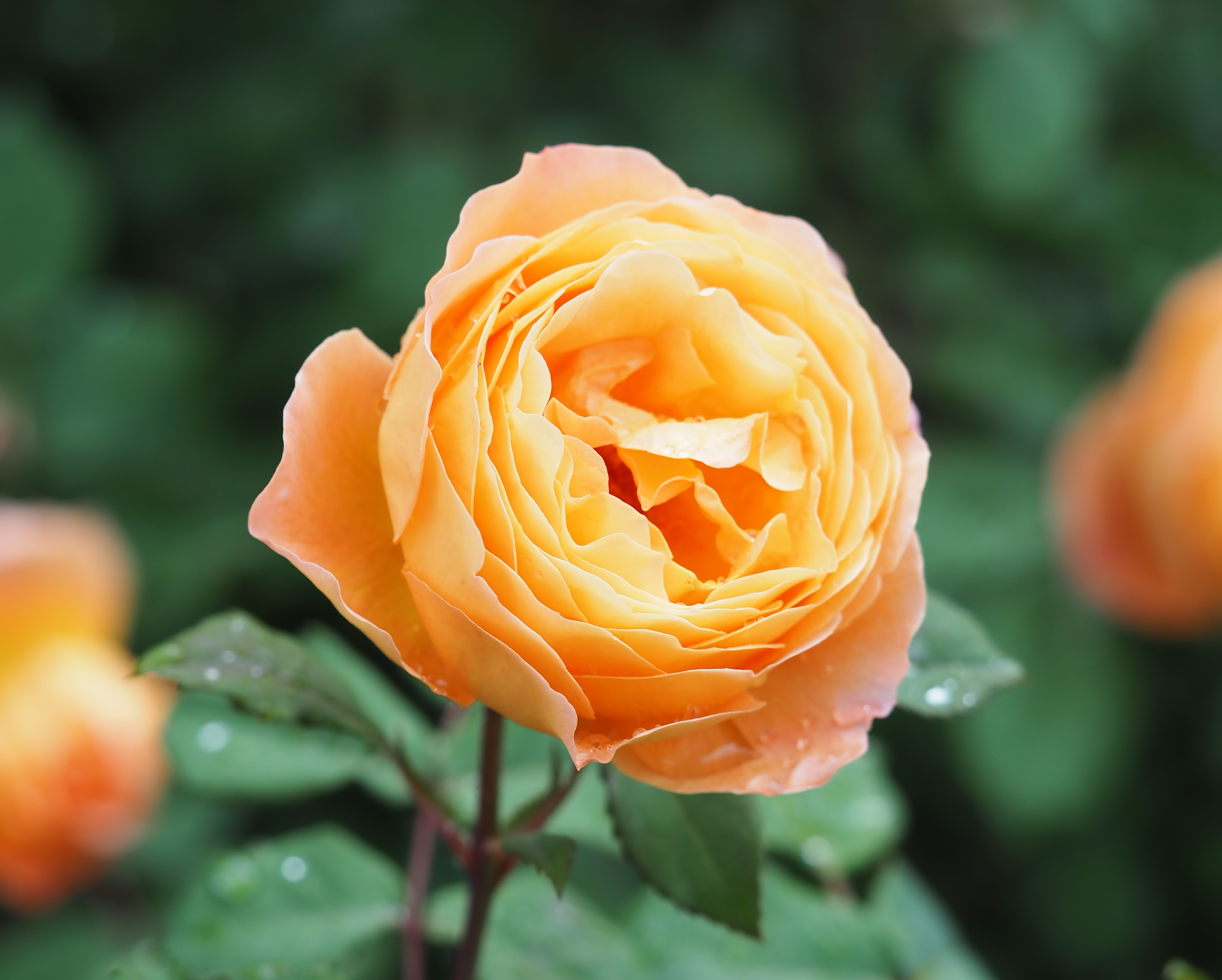
- Rosa Lady Emma Hamilton'
- Genus: Rosa hybrid
- Hybrid parentage: 'Charles Austin' x 'Abraham Darby'
- Cultivar group: Shrub rose
- Cultivar: 'AUSbrother'
- Breeder: David C. H. Austin
- Origin: Great Britain, 2007

Rosa 'Lady Emma Hamilton' (aka AUSbrother) is a yellow shrub rose cultivar, bred by British rose breeder, David C. H. Austin in 2005 and introduced into the UK by David Austin Roses Limited (UK) in 2007. 'Lady Emma Hamilton' is part of the David Austin English Rose Collection. It was awarded the Royal Horticultural Society's Award of Garden Merit in 2012.

== Description ==
Lady Emma Hamilton' is a medium upright, bushy shrub rose, 3 to 4 ft (0.91–1.22 m) in height, with a 2 to 3 ft (0.61–0.91 m) spread. It has a strong, fruity, tea fragrance. The flowers are medium-sized, 3.5 in (89 mm), and very full (40+ petals). Dark red buds open to orange-yellow cupped, globular shaped flowers. The rose blooms in flushes throughout the season. Foliage is dark bronze-green and glossy, and ages to a dark green.

== History ==
=== David Austin roses ===
David C. H. Austin (1926 – 2018) was an award-winning rose breeder, nursery owner and writer from Shropshire, England. He began breeding roses in the 1950s with the goal of creating new shrub rose varieties that would possess the best qualities of old-fashioned roses while incorporating the long flowering characteristics of hybrid tea roses and floribundas. His first commercially successful rose cultivar was 'Constance Spry', which he introduced in 1961. He created a new, informal class of roses in the 1960s, which he named "English Roses". Austin's roses are generally known today as "David Austin Roses". Austin attained international commercial success with his new rose varieties. Some of his most popular roses include 'Wife of Bath' (1969), 'Graham Thomas' (1983), 'Abraham Darby' (1985) and 'Gertrude Jekyll' (1986).

=== 'Lady Emma Hamilton' ===
Austin developed Lady Emma Hamilton' in 2005 using two unnamed seedlings. The cultivar was introduced into the UK by David Austin Roses Limited (UK) in 2007. The rose is part of the David Austin English Rose Collection. Lady Emma Hamilton' was awarded the Royal Horticultural Society's Award of Garden Merit in 2012.

== Sources ==
- Quest-Ritson, Brigid; Quest-Ritson, Charles (2003). Encyclopedia of Roses. DK Publishing. ISBN 978-0756688684.
- Phillips, Roger; Rix, Martyn (1993). The Quest for the Rose. New York: Random House. ISBN 978-0-679-43573-0.
