= Rosa 'Dame Judi Dench' =

Apricot-orange shrub rose cultivar

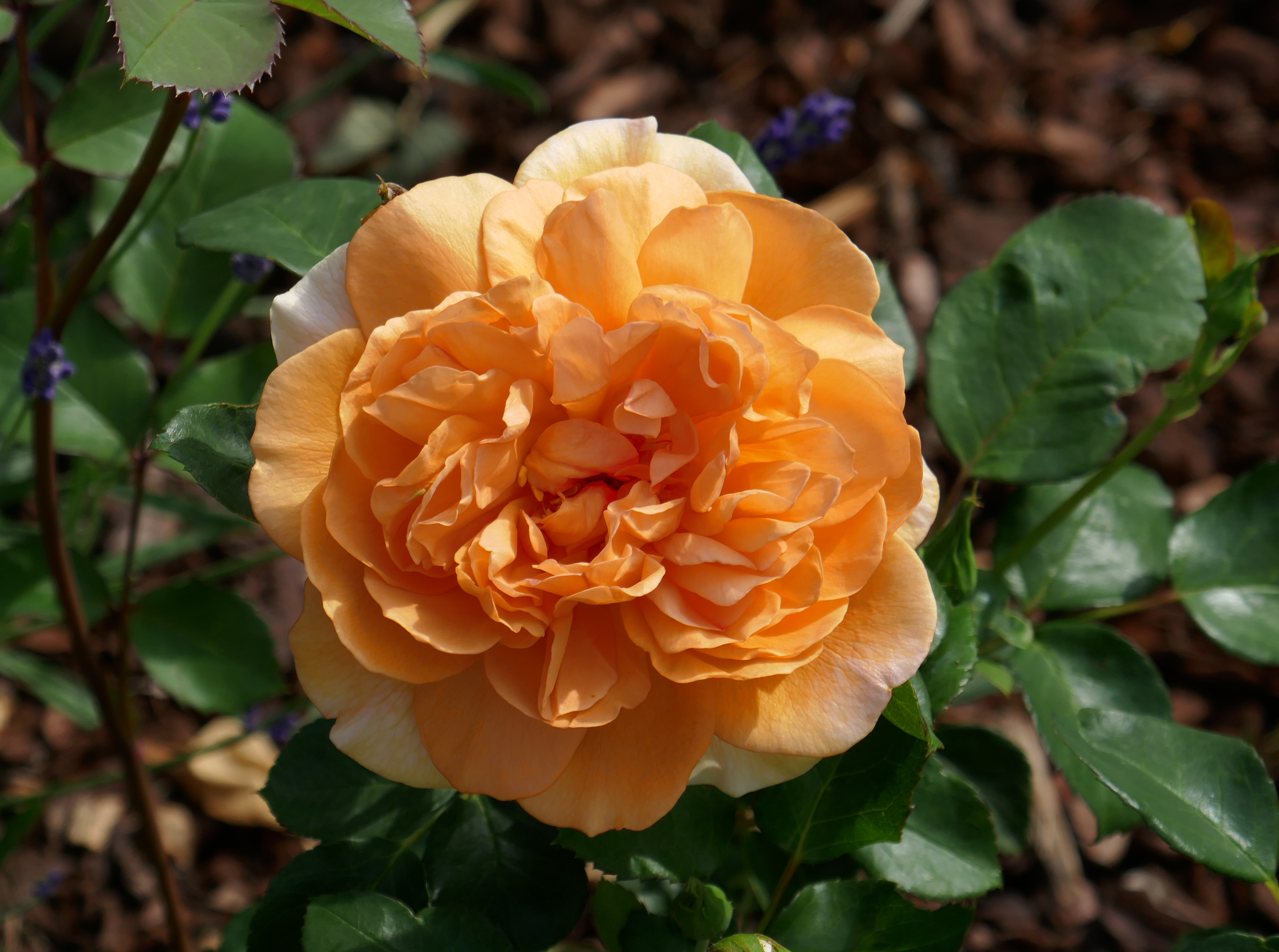
- Genus: Rosa hybrid
- Cultivar group: Shrub rose
- Cultivar: 'AUSquaker'
- Breeder: David C. H. Austin
- Origin: Great Britain, 2009

Rosa 'Dame Judi Dench' (a.k.a. AUSquaker) is an apricot shrub rose cultivar, developed by British rose breeder David C. H. Austin in 2009 and introduced into the UK by David Austin Roses Limited (UK) in 2017. The rose was named in honour of legendary British actress, Dame Judi Dench.

== Description ==
'Dame Judi Dench' is a medium-tall bushy shrub rose, 4 to 5 ft (1.2–1.5 m) in height, with a 3 to 4 ft (0.91–1.22 m) spread. The rose has a strong tea fragrance. Its flowers are 4 to 5 in (100–130 mm) in diameter, with a cupped, ruffled, very full bloom form and a button eye. Bloom colour is apricot-orange with paler apricot outer petals. Flowers are carried in clusters. Leaves are medium, glossy and dark green. The rose is a vigorous grower and blooms in flushes throughout the growing season. It does well in rainy weather.

== History ==
=== David Austin roses ===
David C. H. Austin (1926–2018) was an award-winning rose breeder, nursery owner and writer from Shropshire, England. When he was young, he was attracted to the beauty of old garden roses, especially the Gallicas, the Centifolias and the Damasks, which were popular in nineteenth century France. Austin began breeding roses in the 1950s with the goal of creating new shrub rose varieties that would possess the best qualities of old garden roses while incorporating the long flowering characteristics of hybrid tea roses and floribundas.

His first commercially successful rose cultivar was 'Constance Spry', which he introduced in 1961. He created a new, informal class of roses in the 1960s, which he named "English Roses". Austin's roses are generally known today as "David Austin Roses". Austin attained international commercial success with his new rose varieties. Some of his most popular roses include 'Wife of Bath' (1969), 'Graham Thomas' (1983), 'Abraham Darby' (1985) and 'Gertrude Jekyll' (1986).

=== 'Dame Judi Dench' ===
Austin developed the new cultivar in 2009 by crossing two unknown parents. Resulting seedlings of that cross were selected as buds and grafted onto 'Laxa' ( Rosa canina 'Laxa') rootstock. The new rose was named in honour of legendary British actress, Dame Judi Dench. It was introduced into the UK by David Austin Roses Limited (UK) in 2017.

=== Introduction ===
In May of 2017, the new rose cultivar was introduced at the Chelsea Flower Show, by the actress Judi Dench.
