= Rosa 'Teasing Georgia' =

Yellow blend shrub rose cultivar

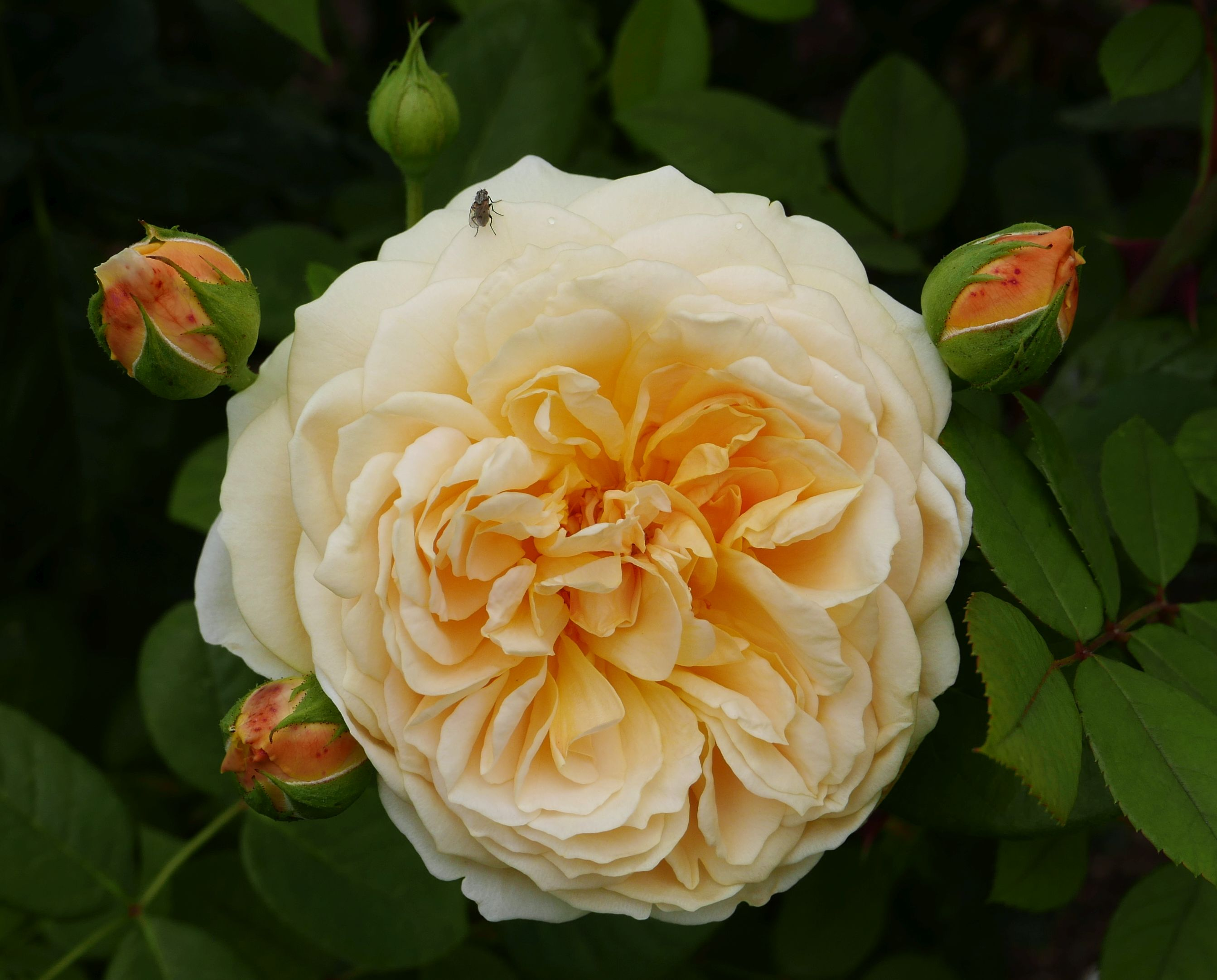
- Rosa Teasing Georgia'
- Genus: Rosa hybrid
- Hybrid parentage: 'Charles Austin' x 'Unnamed Seedling'
- Cultivar group: Shrub rose
- Cultivar: 'AUSbaker'
- Breeder: David C. H. Austin
- Origin: Great Britain, 1998

Rosa 'Teasing Georgia' (aka AUSbaker) is a yellow blend shrub rose cultivar, bred by British rose breeder, David C. H. Austin in 1987 and introduced into the UK by David Austin Roses Limited (UK) in 1998. 'Teasing Georgia' is part of the David Austin English Rose Collection and named in honour of German journalist, Georgia Tornow.

== Description ==
'Teasing Georgia' is a medium-tall, bushy shrub rose, 4 to 5 ft (1.2–1.5 m) in height, with a 3 to 4 ft (0.91–1.22 m) spread. It has a strong, tea rose fragrance. The flowers are medium in size, 3 to 4 in (76–102 mm), and very full (40+ petals) with a cupped, quartered bloom form. They are borne mostly solitary or in small clusters. The color of the rose is a blend of yellow with light apricot shading and light yellow edges. 'Teasing Georgia' blooms in flushes throughout the season. It has a lax growing habit, is disease resistant and not prone to blackspot. Leaves are medium-sized, semi-glossy and dark green. In hot climates, the rose can be grown up to 12 ft (3.7 m) as a climbing rose.

== History ==
=== David Austin roses ===
David C. H. Austin (1926 – 2018) was an award-winning rose breeder, nursery owner and writer from Shropshire, England. He began breeding roses in the 1950s with the goal of creating new shrub rose varieties that would possess the best qualities of old-fashioned roses while incorporating the long flowering characteristics of hybrid tea roses and floribundas. His first commercially successful rose cultivar was 'Constance Spry', which he introduced in 1961. He created a new, informal class of roses in the 1960s, which he named "English Roses". Austin's roses are generally known today as "David Austin Roses". Austin attained international commercial success with his new rose varieties. Some of his most popular roses include 'Wife of Bath' (1969), 'Graham Thomas' (1983), 'Abraham Darby' (1985) and 'Gertrude Jekyll' (1986).

=== 'Teasing Georgia' ===
Austin developed 'Teasing Georgia' in 1987 using 'Charles Austin' x 'Unnamed Seedling' . The cultivar was introduced into the UK by David Austin Roses Limited (UK) in 1998. The rose is part of the David Austin English Rose Collection. The rose was named after German journalist, Georgia Tornow.

== Sources ==
- Quest-Ritson, Brigid; Quest-Ritson, Charles (2003). Encyclopedia of Roses. DK Publishing. ISBN 978-0756688684.
- Phillips, Roger; Rix, Martyn (1993). The Quest for the Rose. New York: Random House. ISBN 978-0-679-43573-0.
