= Rosa 'The Pilgrim' =

Yellow shrub rose cultivar

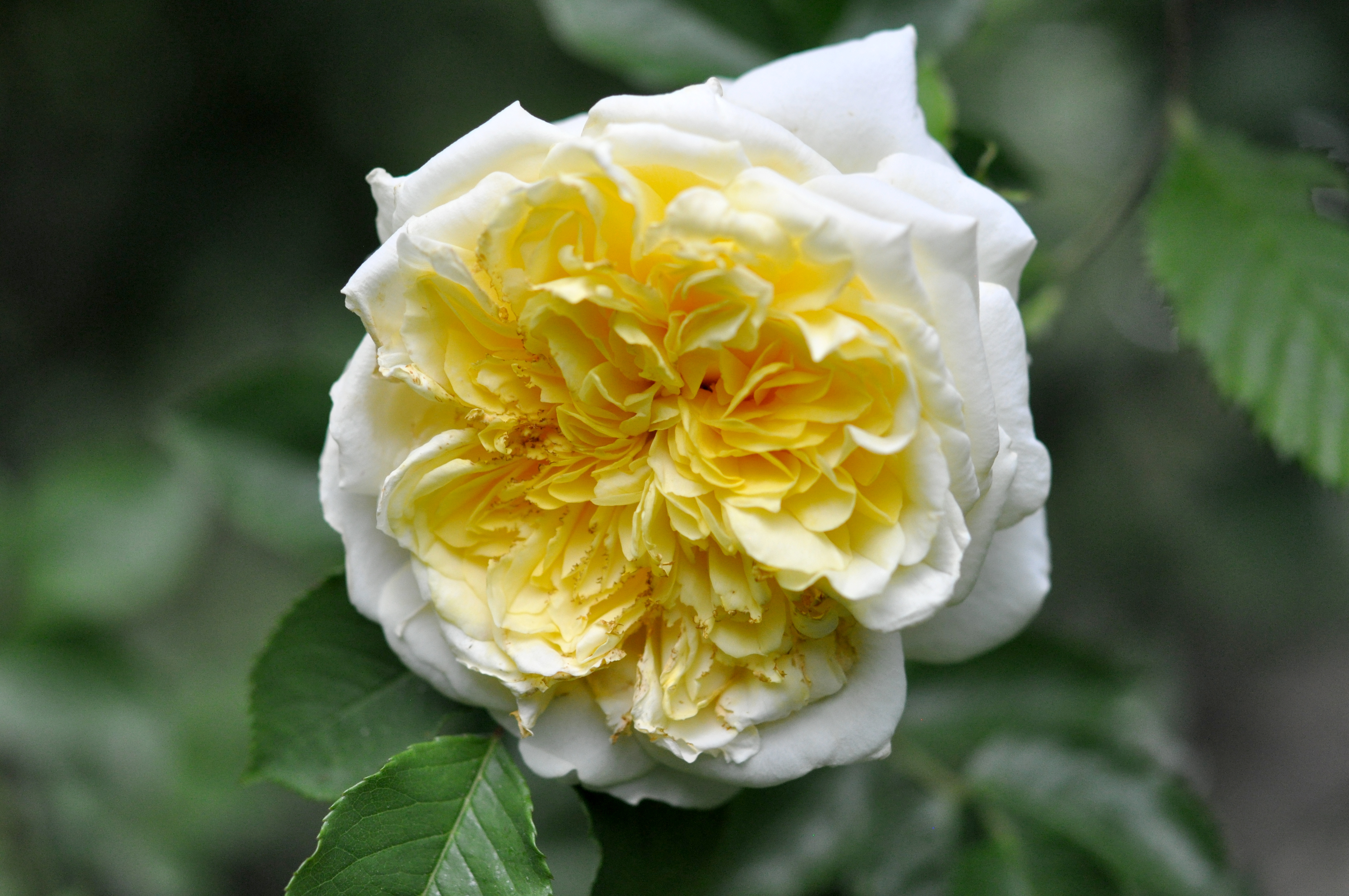
- Rosa 'The Pilgrim'
- Genus: Rosa hybrid
- Hybrid parentage: 'Graham Thomas' x 'Yellow Button'
- Cultivar group: Shrub rose
- Cultivar: AUSwalker
- Marketing names: 'The Pilgrim', 'Gartenarchitekt Gunther Schulze'
- Breeder: David C. H. Austin
- Origin: Great Britain, before 1991

Rosa 'The Pilgrim' (aka AUSwalker) is a yellow shrub rose, bred by British rose breeder, David C. H. Austin before 1991. It was introduced into the United Kingdom by David Austin Roses Limited (UK) in 1991. The rose was named after the pilgrims in Chaucer's Canterbury Tales.

== Description ==
'The Pilgrim' is a vigorous, climbing shrub rose, 3.5 to 8 ft (1.1–2.4 m) in height, with a 3 to 4 ft (0.91–1.22 m) spread. The medium-sized flowers have a cupped to flat bloom form and are borne mostly solitary or in large clusters of up to 15 flowers. Pointed, ovoid buds open to medium yellow roses with light yellow edges. Flowers fade from the edges inward, turning from pale yellow to cream. 'The Pilgrim' has a mild tea and myrrh fragrance and has glossy green foliage. It is an excellent repeat bloomer and is prone to mildew.

== History ==
=== David Austin roses ===
David C. H. Austin (1926 – 2018) was an award-winning rose breeder, nursery owner and writer from Shropshire, England. He began breeding roses in the 1950s with the goal of creating new shrub rose varieties that would possess the best qualities of old-fashioned roses while incorporating the long flowering characteristics of hybrid tea roses and floribundas. His first commercially successful rose cultivar was 'Constance Spry', which he introduced in 1961. He created a new, informal class of roses in the 1960s, which he named "English Roses". Austin's roses are generally known today as "David Austin Roses". Austin attained international commercial success with his new rose varieties. Some of his most popular roses include 'Wife of Bath' (1969), 'Graham Thomas' (1983), and 'Abraham Darby' (1985)

=== 'The Pilgrim' ===
'The Pilgrim' was bred by Austin before 1991. The cultivar was developed from a cross between shrub roses, 'Graham Thomas' and 'Yellow Button'. The new cultivar was named after the pilgrims in Chaucer's Canterbury Tales.
