= Rosa 'A Shropshire Lad' =

Peach blend shrub rose cultivar

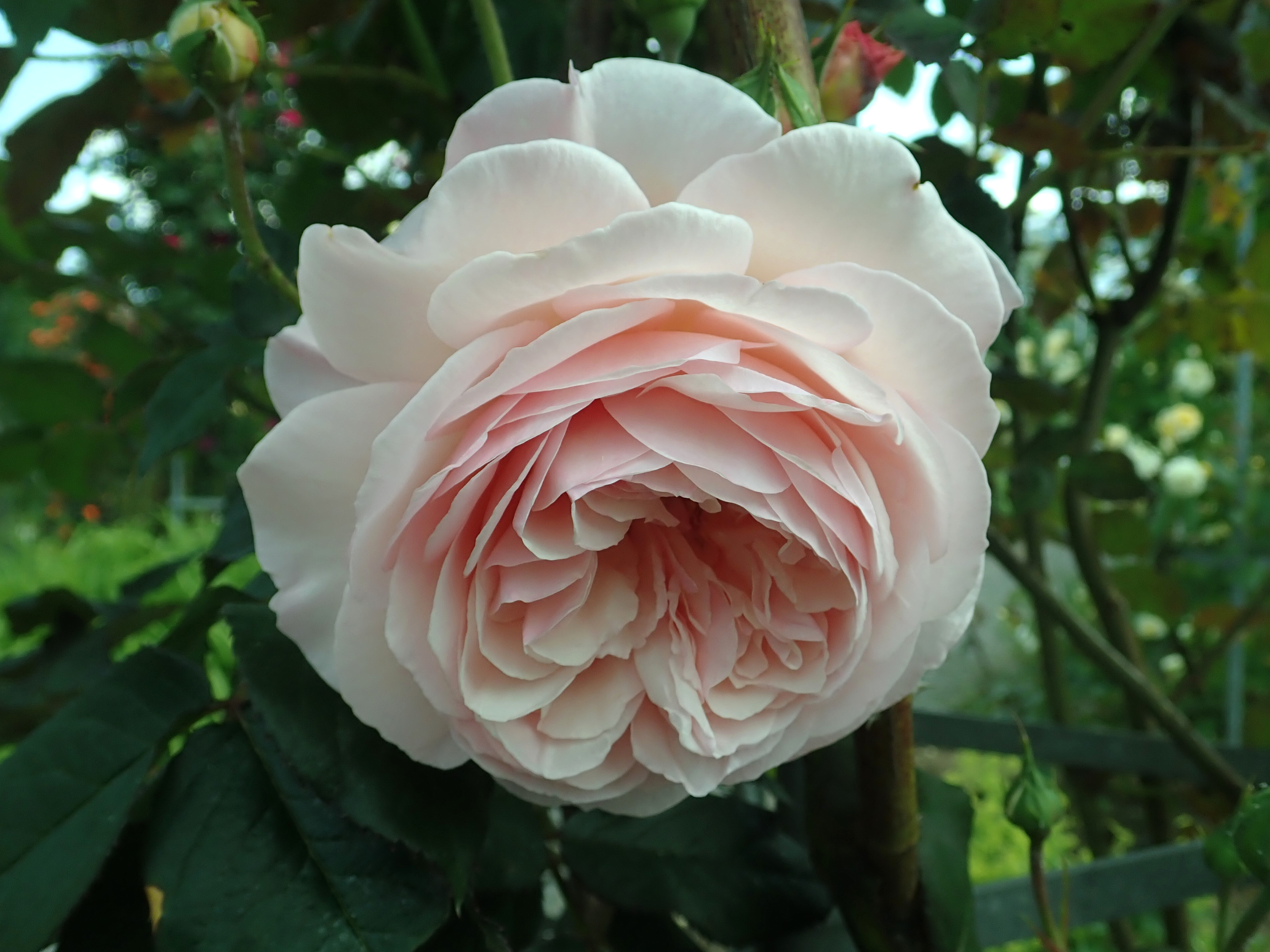
- Rosa 'A Shropshire Lad'
- Genus: Rosa hybrid
- Hybrid parentage: 'Heritage' x 'Unnamed seedling'
- Cultivar group: Shrub rose
- Cultivar: 'AUSled'
- Breeder: David C. H. Austin
- Origin: Great Britain, 1996

Rosa 'A Shropshire Lad' (aka AUSled) is a peach blend shrub rose, bred by British rose breeder, David C. H. Austin before 1991. It was introduced into the United Kingdom by David Austin Roses Limited (UK) in 1996. The rose was named in honor of the collection of poems, 'A Shropshire Lad' by A.E. Housman on the 100th anniversary of its publication.

== Description ==
'A Shropshire Lad' is a medium tall, upright shrub rose, 4 to 6 ft (1.2–1.8 m) in height, with a 3 to 5 ft (0.91–1.52 m) spread. Large flowers open up to a lightly cupped peach rosette with many quilled petals. The flowers can vary from peach to peach-pink in colour and are paler at the edges. The backs of the petals are dark rose in color. The rose has a strong, fruity scent. 'A Shropshire Lad' is almost without thorns and has large, dark green glossy foliage. It blooms in flushes throughout the season.

== History ==
=== David Austin roses ===
David C. H. Austin (1926 – 2018) was an award-winning rose breeder, nursery owner and writer from Shropshire, England. He began breeding roses in the 1950s with the goal of creating new shrub rose varieties that would possess the best qualities of old-fashioned roses while incorporating the long flowering characteristics of hybrid tea roses and floribundas. His first commercially successful rose cultivar was 'Constance Spry', which he introduced in 1961. He created a new, informal class of roses in the 1960s, which he named "English Roses". Austin's roses are generally known today as "David Austin Roses". Austin attained international commercial success with his new rose varieties. Some of his most popular roses include 'Wife of Bath' (1969), 'Graham Thomas' (1983), and 'Abraham Darby' (1985)

=== 'A Shropshire Lad' ===
'A Shropshire Lad' was bred by Austin in 1996. The cultivar was developed from a cross between shrub rose, 'Heritage' and an 'Unnamed' seedling'. The rose was named after the collection of poems, 'A Shropshire Lad' by A.E. Housman on the 100th anniversary of its publication.
