= Rosa 'Charles Austin' =

Rose cultivar

Rosa 'Ausfather'
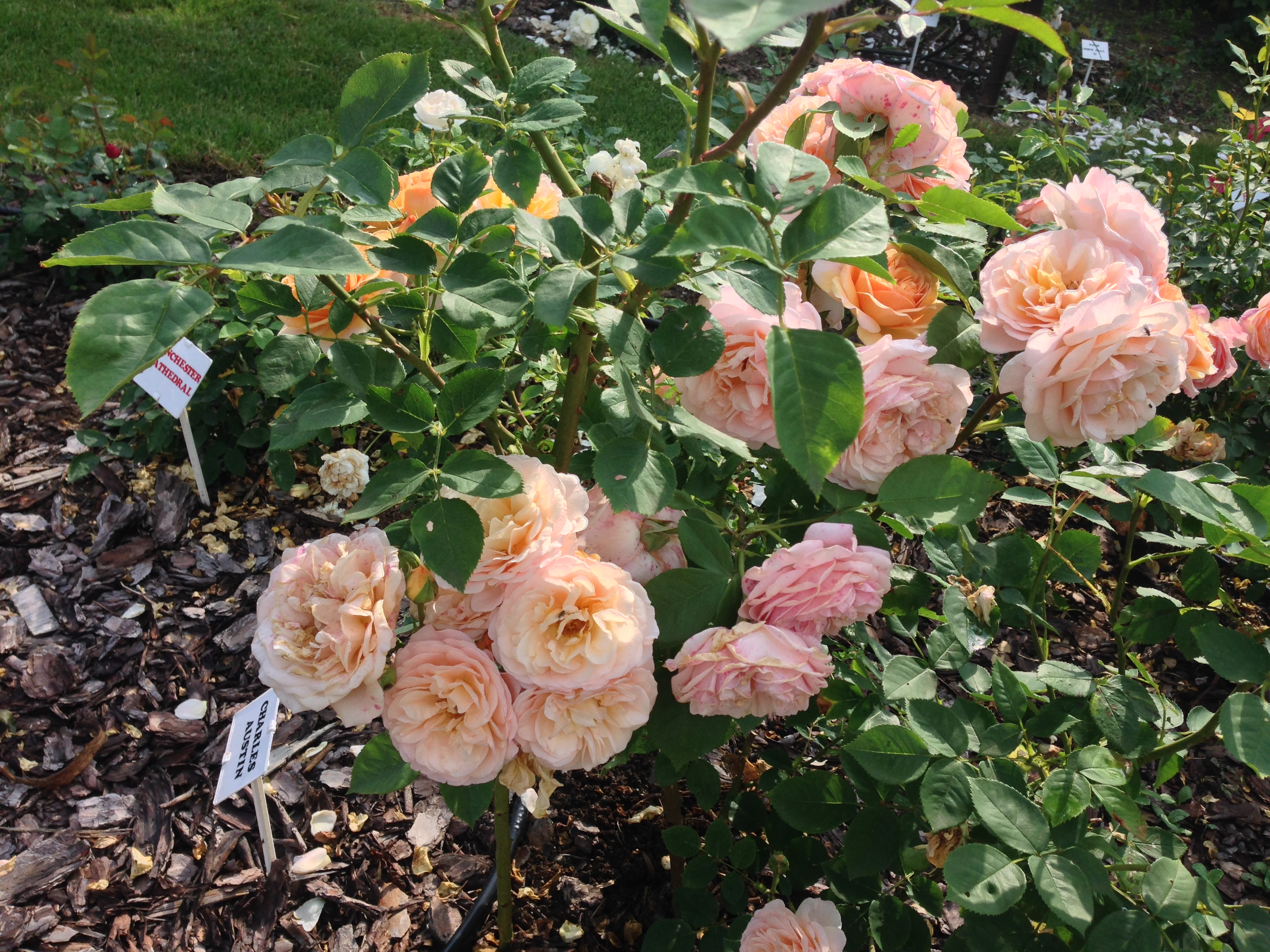
- Genus: Rosa hybrid
- Hybrid parentage: 'Chaucer' × 'Aloha'
- Cultivar group: English rose
- Cultivar: 'AUSfather', 'AUSles', 'Charming Apricot'
- Marketing names: 'Charles Austin'
- Origin: David Austin, England, 1973

Rosa 'Charles Austin' (a.k.a. AUSfather) is an apricot shrub rose cultivar bred and introduced by David Austin in England in 1973. The rose was hybridised by crossing the English rose 'Chaucer' (Austin, 1970) with the pink Hybrid Tea 'Aloha' (Boerner 1949) and is named after the breeder's father. It was one of the early English roses.

== Description ==
Double, flat or slightly cupped flowers with a strong, fruity fragrance, and an average diameter of 10 cm (4 inches) appear in small cluster of 3 to 5 in flushes throughout the season.Their colour is an apricot blend, with stronger colours at the petal base, fading to cream at the edges. The flowers have about 70 petals arranged in a quartered bloom form, with the outer ones lighter than the inner ones, and are well suited as cut flowers.

The tall and bushy shrub can grow well in excess of 200 cm, especially in warmer climates and is somewhat slow to rebloom, especially if not drastically pruned after the first flush. The cultivar has large leaves and fine, red prickles, is winter hardy up to −20 °C (USDA zone 5b – 10b), but susceptible to black spot and mildew. Due to its size, it can be grown as a freestanding shrub, pegged or trained as a small climber.

== History ==
=== David Austin roses ===
David C. H. Austin (1926 – 2018) was an award-winning rose breeder, nursery owner and writer from Shropshire, England. He began breeding roses in the 1950s with the goal of creating new shrub rose varieties that would possess the best qualities of old-fashioned roses while incorporating the long flowering characteristics of hybrid tea roses and floribundas. His first commercially successful rose cultivar was 'Constance Spry', which he introduced in 1961. He created a new, informal class of roses in the 1960s, which he named "English Roses". Austin's roses are generally known today as "David Austin Roses". Austin attained international commercial success with his new rose varieties. Some of his most popular roses include 'Wife of Bath' (1969), 'Canterbury' (1969), and 'Abraham Darby' (1985)

=== 'Charles Austin' ===
This rose was bred by Austin in 1973 and named for his father, Charles Austin. The rose was hybridised by crossing the English rose 'Chaucer' (Austin, 1970) with the pink Hybrid Tea 'Aloha' (Boerner 1949). It was one of the early English roses. 'Charles Austin' was further used by Austin as a parent rose and fathered ten cultivars, including 'Leander' (1982), 'Graham Thomas' (1983), 'Swan' (1987), 'Brother Cadfael' (1990), 'Golden Celebration' (1992), 'Tradescant' (1993), 'Teasing Georgia' (1998) and 'Benjamin Britten' (2001). In 1981, Austin introduced a sport (mutation) – 'Yellow Charles Austin' – with lemon to golden yellow colours, that fade to cream. Charles Austin (Ausfather) is one of a number of varieties which has been 'retired' by the David Austin Roses company in favour of other more modern and healthy varieties.
