= Rosa 'Graham Thomas' =

Yellow shrub rose

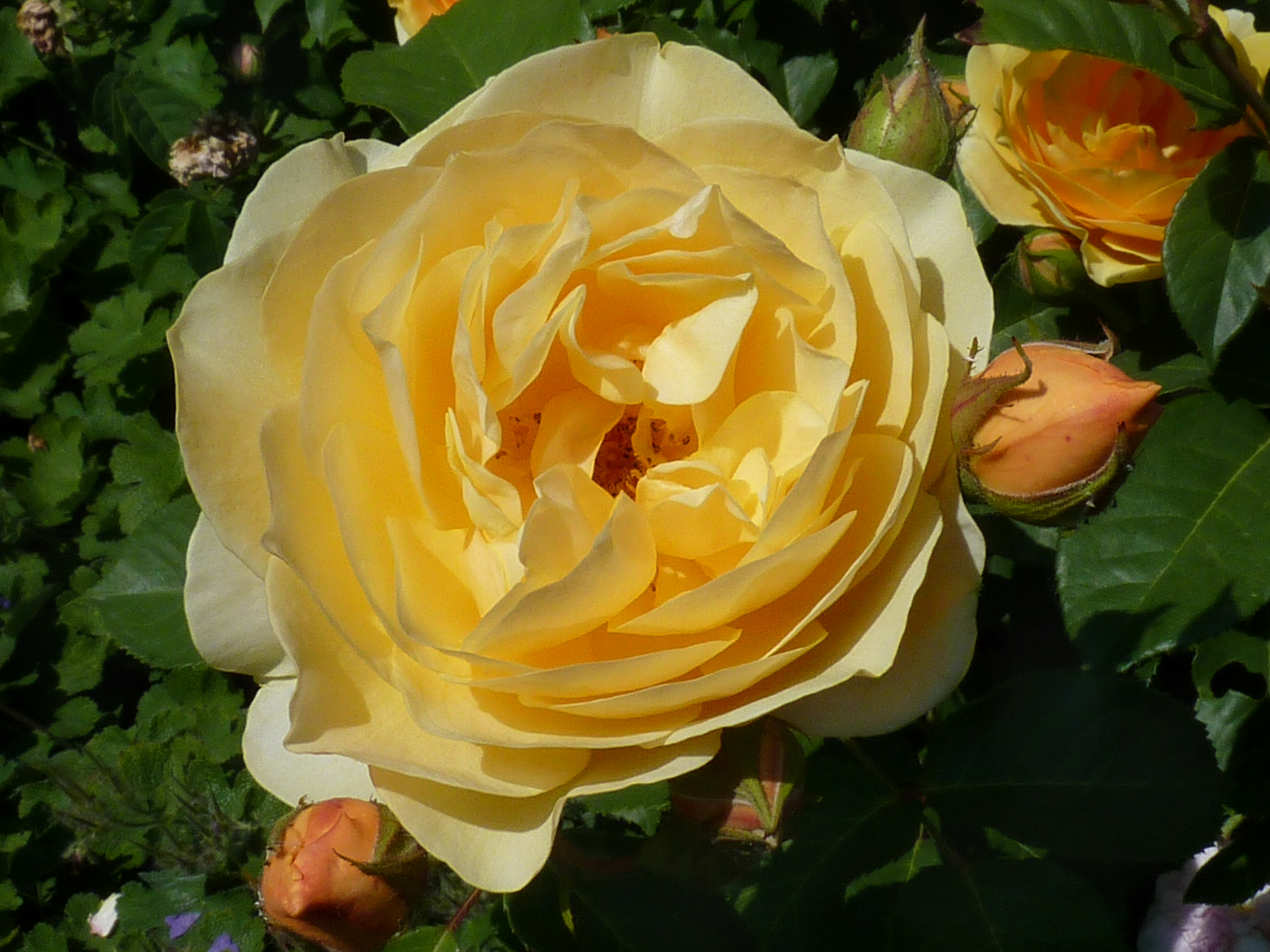
- Genus: Rosa hybrid
- Hybrid parentage: Rosa 'Charles Austin' × ('Iceberg' x 'Unnamed Seedling')
- Cultivar group: Modern shrub / English rose
- Cultivar: 'Graham Thomas'
- Marketing names: Ausmas, 'Lemon Parody'
- Origin: David C.H. Austin, 1983

Graham Thomas (a.k.a. AUSmas) is a deep yellow shrub rose bred by British rose breeder, David C.H. Austin, and introduced into the United Kingdom by David Austin Roses Limited (UK) in 1983. The cultivar was named for legendary rose horticulturalist Graham Thomas. The rose was awarded the Royal Horticultural Society's Award of Garden Merit in 1993 and inducted into the Rose Hall of Fame in 2009 as "World's Favourite Rose".

== Description ==
'Graham Thomas' is an upright yellow shrub rose, 4 to 10 ft (1.2–3.0 m) in height, with a 3 to 5 ft (0.91–1.52 m) spread. The large 4 in (100 mm) flowers have a full, cupped bloom form and are borne mostly solitary or in large, long-stemmed clusters of 3 to 9 flowers. The color has been described variously as "rich deep yellow", "golden yellow", "amber" and "ochre yellow", and fades to a pale lemon as the bloom ages. The plant blooms in flushes throughout the season. It has a strong "tea" fragrance and is very disease resistant. Flowers are short-lived, so they do not make good cut flowers. Leaves are large and vary in colour from bright to pale green. The plant can reach 10 ft (3.0 m) in hot climates, but is difficult to train as a climber because of its rigid stems and upright habit.

"'This is an iconic rose. Not only is it the biggest and best yellow of all David Austin English Roses, but its name commemorates the man who did more than anyone in the 20th century to reintroduce old roses to popularity."

— Quest-Ritson, 2003

== History ==
=== David Austin roses ===
David C. H. Austin (1926 – 2018) was an award-winning rose breeder, nursery owner and writer from Shropshire, England. He began breeding roses in the 1950s with the goal of creating new shrub rose varieties that would possess the best qualities of old-fashioned roses while incorporating the long flowering characteristics of hybrid tea roses and floribundas. His first commercially successful rose cultivar was 'Constance Spry', which he introduced in 1961. He created a new, informal class of roses in the 1960s, which he named "English Roses". Austin's roses are generally known today as "David Austin Roses". Austin attained international commercial success with his new rose varieties. Some of his most popular roses include 'Wife of Bath' (1969), 'Graham Thomas' (1983), 'Abraham Darby' (1985), and 'A Shropshire Lad'.

=== 'Graham Thomas' ===
Austin developed 'Graham Thomas' by crossing the white floribunda, 'Iceberg', and an 'Unnamed seedling' with the shrub rose, 'Charles Austin'. The new cultivar was named for legendary horticulturalist and restorer of old roses Graham Thomas. David Austin Roses Limited (UK) introduced 'Graham Thomas' into the UK in 1983. Austin used 'Graham Thomas' extensively in further breeding. Over 20 child plants of 'Graham Thomas' have been developed by Austin and other rose-breeders. Selected child plants include, 'Anne Boleyn' (1991), 'Evelyn' (1992), 'The Pilgrim' (1991), 'Versigny' (1992), 'Charlotte' (1994), 'Molineux' (1994), and 'Charity' (1998).

'Graham Thomas' has been described as "the most popular" of Austin's creations and has won numerous horticultural awards. It was the first Austin rose to win the Royal Horticultural Society's Award of Garden Merit at the Chelsea Flower show ten years after its introduction in 1993. It was named The World's Favourite Rose, entering the Rose Society Hall of Fame in 2009.

== Sources ==
- Phillips, Roger (1993). Quest for the Rose: A Historical Guide to Roses. Random House. ISBN 978-0679435730.
- Quest-Ritson, Brigid; Quest-Ritson, Charles (2003). Encyclopedia of Roses. DK Publishing. ISBN 978-0756688684.
