= List of rose breeders =

Some rose growers are known for their particular contributions to the field. These include:

== A ==
- David C.H. Austin (1926–2018), British breeder of English-style roses including the 'Wife of Bath'

== B ==
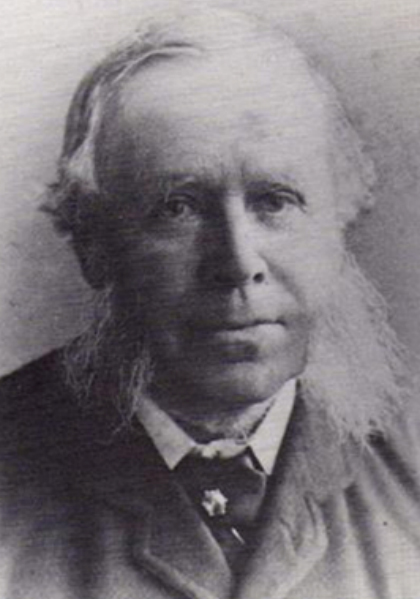
Henry Bennett (1823–1890)

- René Barbier (1870–1931), of Barbier Frères & Compagnie, an early twentieth-century French company based near Orléans (France), produced some very popular Ramblers including 'Albéric Barbier' (1900), 'Paul Transom' (1901), 'Alexandre Girault' (1909), and 'Albertine' (1921). Most of Barbier's climbers can be found in the Roseraie de L'Haÿ in L'Haÿ-les-Roses near Paris.
- Peter Beales was a specialist in classic and species roses, preserving many old and wild roses at his Norfolk nursery and also introducing 70 new cultivars. He was also the author of several classic books on roses.
- Joséphine de Beauharnais (Empress Josephine) was the first great collector of roses in the modern Western world, and her horticulturalist André Dupont pioneered the development of new hybrids using controlled pollination at her Malmaison estate. She has been called the godmother of modern rosomaniacs.
- Henry Bennett (1823–1890) was one of the first rosarians to systematically breed roses. His hybrids, between Teas and Hybrid Perpetuals, were called Hybrides de Thé or Hybrid Teas. Important cultivars are the Hybrid Tea 'Lady Mary Fitzwilliam' (1882), a parent of 'Mme. Caroline Testout' and the Hybrid Perpetuals 'Captain Hayward' (1893) and 'Mrs. John Laing' (1887).
- Johannes Böttner (1861–1919), a German horticulturist who created several new rose cultivars, e.g. 'Frankfurt' and 'Fragezeichen'.
- Brownwell family, an American family of rose breeders, Dr. and Mrs. Josephine Brownwell and son, H.C. Brownwell who developed hardy 'sub-zero roses' from the 1920s to 1950s.
- Tony Bracegirdle (1942–2025), British rose breeder and horticulturist, winner of the Royal National Rose Society Open Championships
- Griffith Buck, professor of horticulture at Iowa State University from 1948 to 1985, hybridized nearly 90 rose varieties known for disease resistance and winter hardiness, including 'Applejack', 'Folksinger' and 'Prairie Princess'.
- Georges Bugnet, French Canadian writer and plant hybridiser who spent 25 years breeding roses which were hardy in the cold winters of Alberta. Introduced 'Thérèse Bugnet' (named after his sister) in 1950.

== C ==
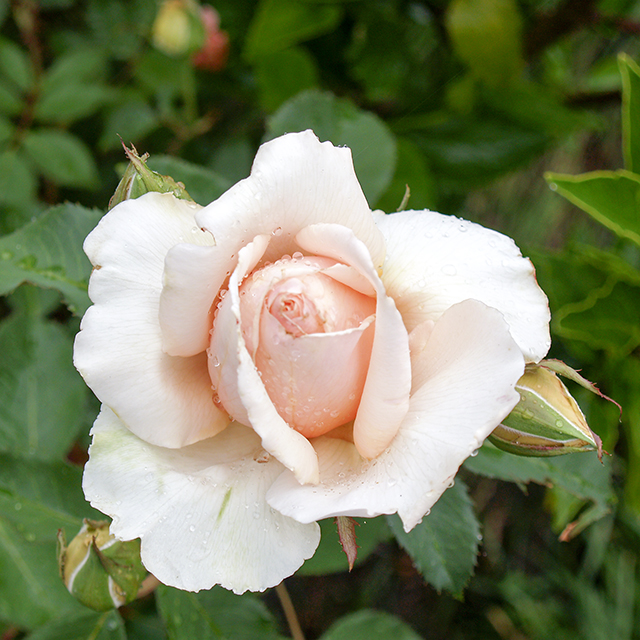
The Hybrid Tea 'Just Joey' (Cants of Colchester 1972) was inducted in the Rose Hall of Fame in 1994.

- Cants of Colchester, in Essex, was the UK's oldest firm of commercial rose growers until it closed in 2023. Notable introductions include 'Mrs B.R. Cant' and 'Just Joey'.
- Tom Carruth, who has worked for Jackson & Perkins, Armstrong Roses and Weeks Rose Growers, has created more than 100 rose varieties, including eleven All America Rose Selections (AARS). He is currently the E.L. and Ruth B. Shannon Curator of the Rose Collections at the Huntington Library in San Marino, California.
- Jack E. Christensen (died 2021) developed over 80 roses during his career and is the youngest hybridizer to have a All-America Rose Selections winner, Rosa 'Voodoo' in 1986.
- Alister Clark was an amateur nurseryman based near Melbourne, who introduced more than 130 new roses suitable for the Australian climate. Notable introductions include 'Lorraine Lee' and 'Squatter's Dream'.
- Conard-Pyle Co. introduced the rose 'Peace' to the US and established the marque Star Roses. 'Peace' was bred by Meilland of France (where it was introduced as 'Mme A. Meilland'); Conard-Pyle acted as Meilland's US agents, and the rose was renamed for the US market when it was introduced at the end of the Second World War.
- Pierre Antoine Marie Crozy, of Avoux & Crozy, Lyon, was a nineteenth-century French rose breeder.
- Anne Cocker of James Cocker & Sons, Aberdeen, Scotland. Known for her unusually colored and patterned rose varieties. Award-winning rose breeder. (1920–2014)
- Alec Cocker, fourth generation owner of James Cocker & Sons nursery. award-winning rose breeder. (1907–1977)

== D ==
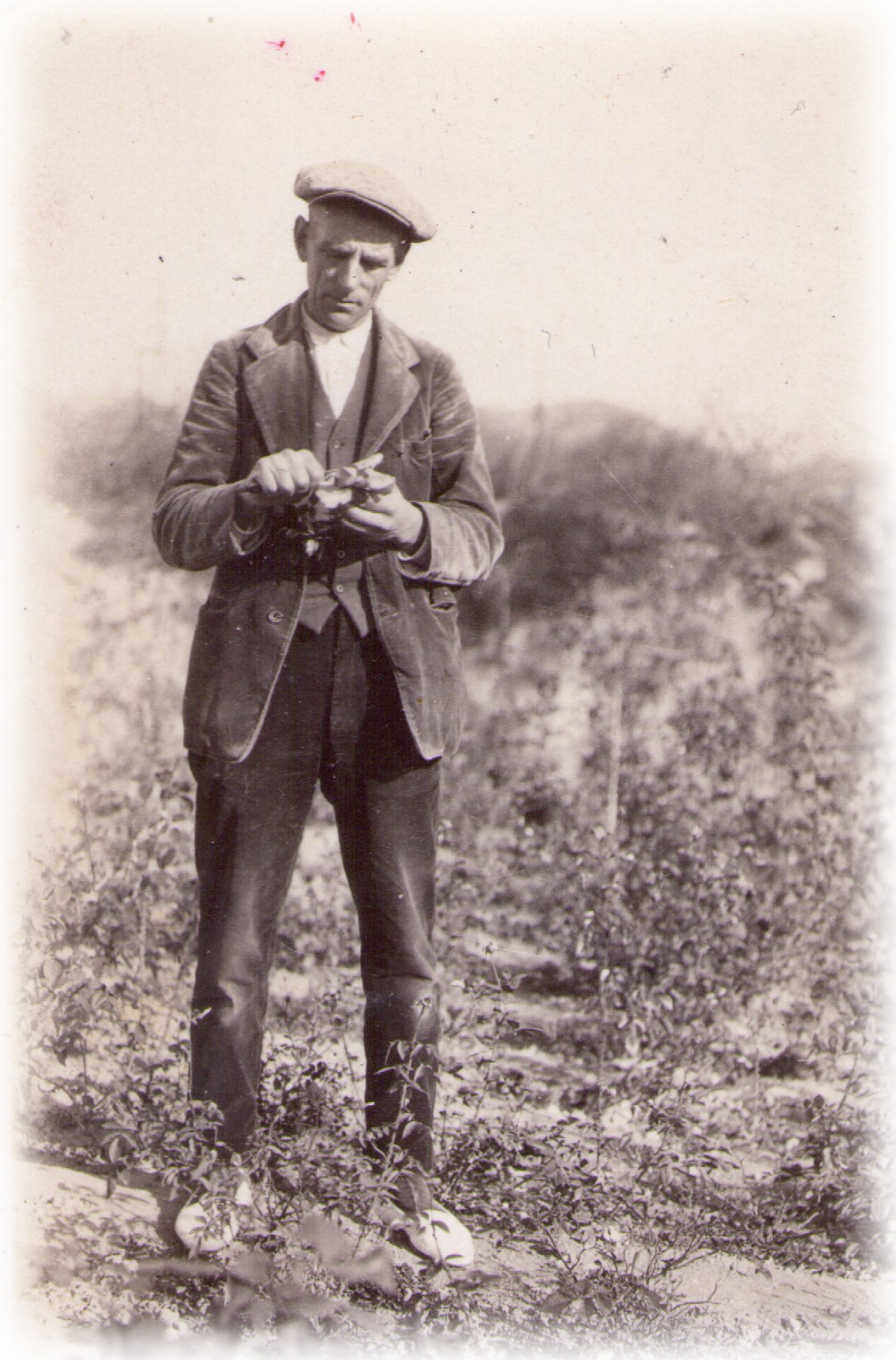
Pedro Dot (1885–1976)

- Georges Delbard of Allier, France is more famous for new varieties of fruit tree, but among his nursery's roses are 'Centenaire de Lourdes', 'Altissimo' and 'Papa Delbard'.
- Dickson Roses, located near Belfast introduced its first roses in 1886, focusing on breeding Hybrid Teas that could stand up to the Irish climate. Successes include 'Shot Silk' and 'Grandpa Dickson' and, more recently, 'Elina' and 'Tequila Sunrise'.
- Pedro Dot put Spanish rose growing on the map and is best known for the shrub 'Nevada' and his work to improve the flower shape of miniature varieties.
- Francis Dubreuil (1842–1916) French rose breeder. Grandfather of Francis Meilland, introduced Rosa 'Perle d'Or' and developed 64 rose varieties during his career.
- André Dupont was a French horticulturalist who pioneered the creation of new rose cultivars through controlled pollination. He was employed by the Empress Josephine to use her collection of roses to create new roses, including the "Dupont rose" (R. 'Dupontii').

== F ==
- Olive Fitzhardinge was the first Australian rose breeder to patent her work. Her three surviving roses 'Warrawee', 'Lady Edgeworth David' and 'Lubra' can be seen in Australian collections.
- Eugenio Fojo was a Spanish rose breeder and the founder of 'La Florida', the most influential plant nursery and garden design firm in northern Spain and the Basque Country in the 1930s. His rose 'Irene Churruca' is still sold as one of the classic roses of that era.
- Fryer's Roses, based in Knutsford, Cheshire, UK, is a family firm established by Arthur Fryer in 1912.

== G ==
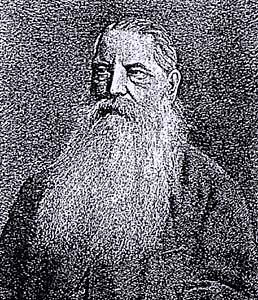
Rudolf Geschwind (1829–1910)

- Rudolf Geschwind (1829–1910) was an Austro-Hungarian amateur rose breeder who introduced 140 new varieties, focusing on winter hardiness and vigour. His creations include 'Gruss an Teplitz', which was included into the Old Rose Hall of Fame in 2000, 'Zigeunerknabe' (synonym 'Gypsy Boy') Geschwind also wrote the first German book about rose breeding (Die Hybridation und Sämlingszucht der Rosen), which was published in 1886.
- Jean-Marie Gonod was a French rosarian, working for the Parc de la Tête d’Or in Lyon.
- Jules Gravereaux built the first garden devoted exclusively to roses, the Roseraie de L'Haÿ. He created 27 new cultivars, primarily for rose oil production – the cultivar 'Rose à parfum de L'Haÿ', among others.
- Jean Gressard is a French rose hybridized in Saint-Rémy-de-Provence, France.
- Jean-Baptiste André Guillot (9 December 1827 – 6 September 1893), son of Jean-Baptiste Guillot, and therefore referred to as Guillot Fils, was a pioneering rose hybridizer in Lyon, France, in the later half of the 19th Century. He introduced roses from 1850 to about 1887. He is famous for producing the first Hybrid Tea, 'La France', introduced in 1867.

== H ==
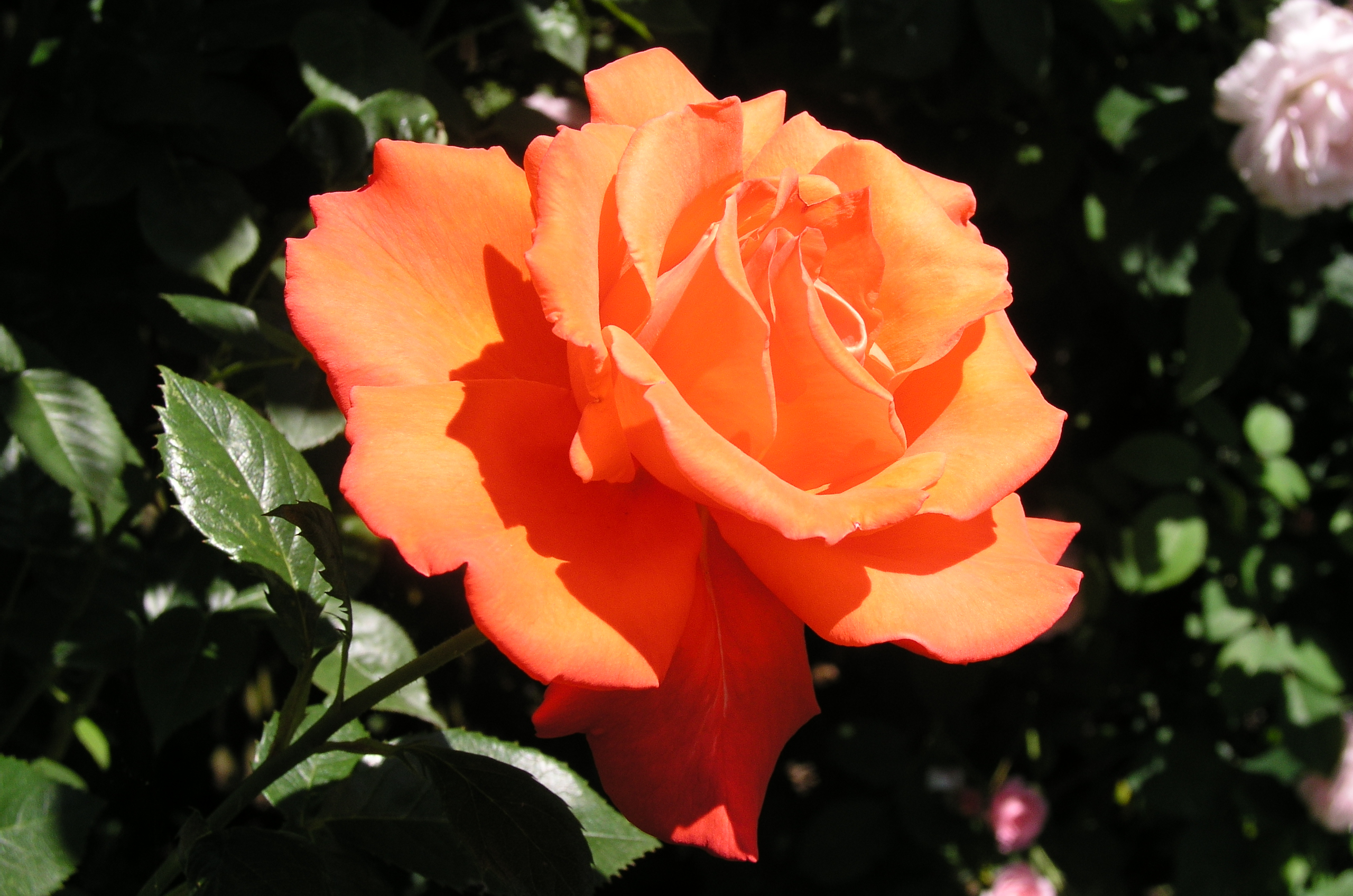
'Alexander' by Harkness

- Harkness Roses, in Hertfordshire, UK is best known for 'Ena Harkness' (at one time reputed to be the best-selling red Hybrid Tea in the world and actually bred by amateur rosarian Albert Norman). Other famous introductions include 'Alexander', 'Compassion' and 'Margaret Merril'.
- Nicolai Anders von Hartwiss was a Livonian-born Russian botanist, plant explorer and plant breeder, who created more than 100 varieties of roses at the Nikita Garden. Two are still growing at the Alupka Palace: 'Comtesse Elisabeth Woronzof' 1833 and 'Belle de Nikita' 1833, thought by some to be the rose imported into France and sold as 'Maréchal Niel'.
- Roy Hennessey was a rose nurseryman in Scappoose, Oregon in the early part of the 20th century. He published works on rose cultivation that often countered prevailing practices.
- Edward Gurney Hill (1847–1933) was an American nurseryman and rose breeder in the late 1800s and early 1900s. He was the first nurseryman to use greenhouses in America. He is known for his award-winning roses, including 'Madame Butterfly', 'Columbia', 'Richmond' and 'General McArthur'.
- Joseph H. Hill (died 1958) was an American nurseryman and rose breeder from 1916 to 1958. He bred many successful rose varieties, including the ancestor of the 'Peace' rose, yellow hybrid tea, 'Joanna Hill'.
- Albert Hoffmann was a German rosarian and one of the founders of the "Sangerhausen Rosarium". He named the cultivar 'Alice Hoffman' after his daughter.

== J ==
- Jackson & Perkins was a hugely influential American rose grower. The company's early success was 'Dorothy Perkins', but under Eugene Boerner the focus on developing Floribundas led to many All-America Rose Selection honours.
- Henri Antoine Jacques (1782–1866) was a breeder of several French roses, under the patronage of King Louis Philippe I.
- Jean Pernet (1832–1896) was an important French rose breeder who developed Hybrid Perpetual and Bourbon roses. His father, Claude Pernet established the World's first exhibition of roses. His son Joseph Pernet-Ducher developed the first yellow Hybrid tea rose and the class of roses known as "Pernetiana roses".

== K ==
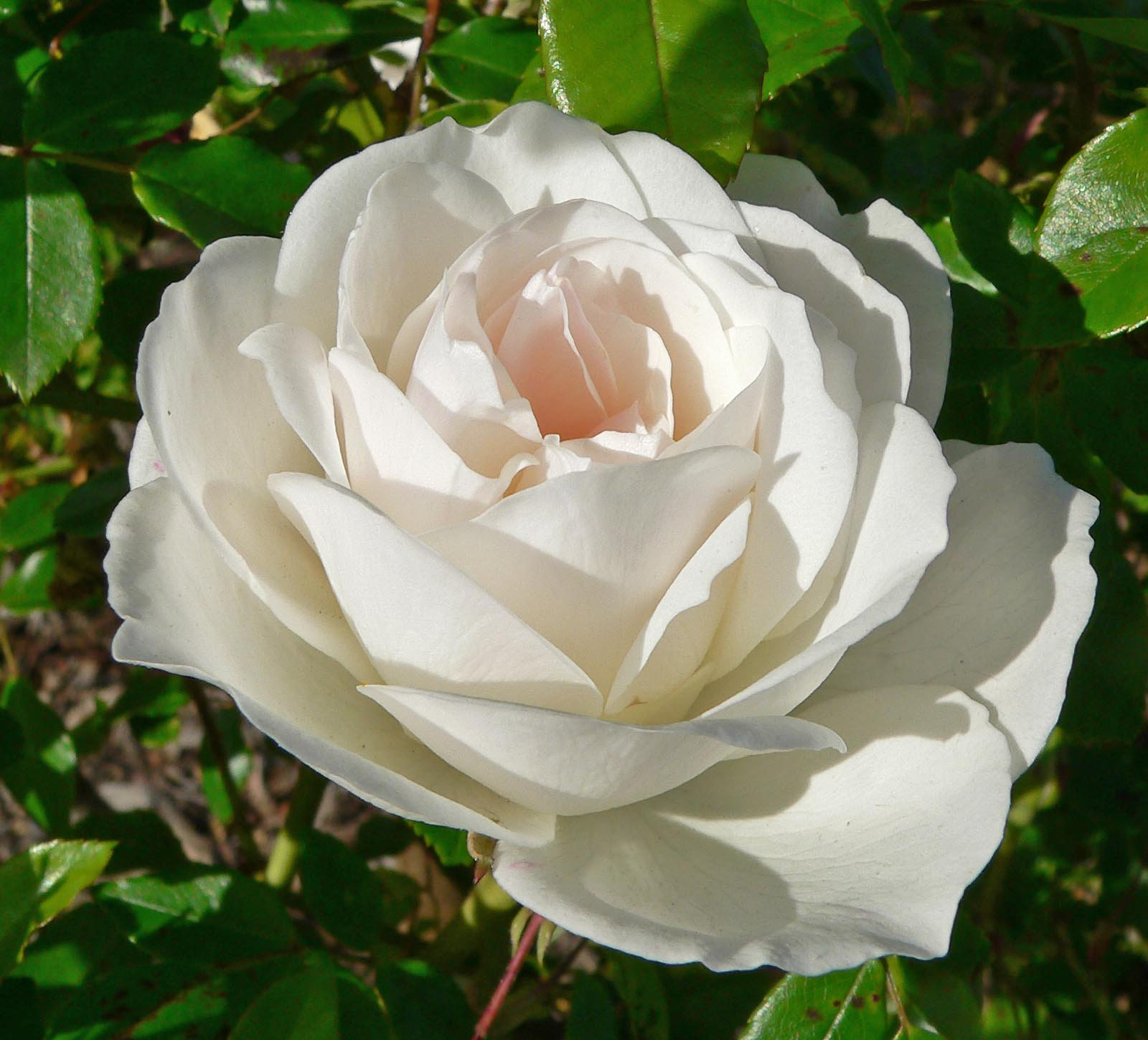
'Iceberg' by Kordes

- Ketten Frères, (1867–1949) was a Luxembourg-based company founded by Jean and Evrard Ketten, who notably created the Grande-Duchesse Charlotte (1939 Goldmedaille in Rom).
- Hermann Kiese (1865–1923) was a German rosarian. He is one of the founders of the Verein Deutscher Rosenfreunde and was chief editor of the magazine Rosen-Zeitung for five years. Notable cultivars he introduced are 'Tausendschön' (1906), 'Otto von Bismarck' (1908) and 'Gruß an Frankfurt' (1918).
- Klitscher, Jochen breeder for W. Kordes Soehne, Sparrieshoop, Germany from 1955 to the 1990s.
- George Robert Knight was an Australian rose breeder.
- W. Kordes' Sons, based in Sparrieshoop in Schleswig-Holstein, Germany, is one of the most innovative rose breeders and growers, and responsible for the early flowering "Frühlings" series, the Kordesii Hybrids and many famous Hybrid Tea and Floribunda roses, including 'Crimson Glory' and 'Iceberg' ('Schneewittchen').

== L ==
- Peter Lambert was a German rose breeder from Trier, who bred many original rose varieties including 'Frau Karl Druschki', 'Adam Messerich' and 'Mozart'. He was a founder of the Verein Deutscher Rosenfreunde (German Rose Society), was a jurist for several rose competitions (Saint Petersburg, Paris, London, etc.) and helped establish the Europa-Rosarium at Sangerhausen.
- Dr. Walter E. Lammerts (1904-1996) was an American author, plant researcher, horticulturist, and rose breeder. He was a professor at the University of California, Los Angeles from 1940-1945 and during that time he helped Knott's Berry Farm establish its berry program.
- Henri Lédéchaux was a French rosarian and the breeder of 'American Beauty' (1875)
- Louis Lens was a Belgian rose breeder. His cultivars 'Pascali' was chosen as World's Favourite Rose in 1991.

== M ==
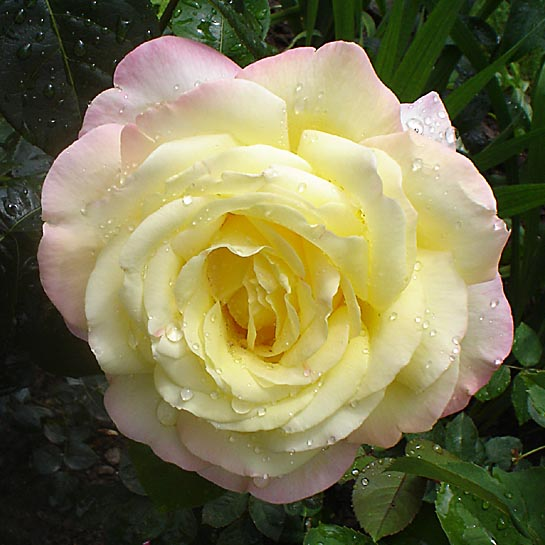
'Peace' from Meilland

- Sam McGredy refers to 4 generations of Northern Irish rose hybridizers, with a nursery founded in 1880.
- Meilland family made its name and fortune with 'Mme A. Meilland' ('Peace'), and has continued to be at the forefront of rose breeding, with varieties such as 'Bonica '82' and 'Swany'. Francis Meilland, Antoine Meilland, Marie-Louise Meilland, Alain Meilland, Michelle Meilland Richardier.
- Ralph S. Moore, the California -based breeder of more than 500 roses, is known as 'the father of Modern Miniatures' and was a hugely influential figure in the development of commercial approaches to rose hybridization.
- Hilda Murrell (1906–1984) was an English rose grower, naturalist, diarist and campaigner against nuclear energy and weapons. She led Edwin Murrell Ltd from 1937 to 1970 and was an internationally respected rose-grower and authority on rose species, old-fashioned varieties and miniature roses.
- Jacques Mouchotte, of Meilland International SA, developed a large number of rose varieties from 1978 to his retirement in 2013.
- Dr. Dennison Harlow Morey (1923-2012), noted American horticulturalist and rosarian.

== N ==
- Louis Claude Noisette was a French botanist. The Noisette roses were named after him.
- Pierre Notting was a Luxembourgian rosarian known for his breeding of rose cultivars. With his friend Jean Soupert, he established the "Soupert & Notting" company specializing in growing roses in Limpertsberg.

== P ==
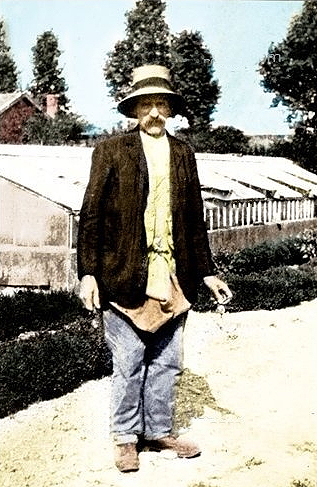
Joseph Pernet-Ducher (1859–1928)

- Paul was a Hertfordshire, UK nursery first located in Broxbourne, later in Cheshunt. The nursery was originally run by Adam Paul and was known as Paul and son, later as The Old Nursery. His son William started his own nursery (Royal Nurseries) in Waltham Cross, wrote a book about roses (The Rose Garden-1888) and introduced new varieties. His grandson George, who also owned the nursery, introduced hybrids such as Cheshunt. Collectively, Paul is known today for varieties such as 'Paul's Lemon Pillar' and 'Paul's Scarlet Climber'. Experimental hybrids using species roses resulted in choice varieties such as 'Mermaid'. They are still widely available.
- Joseph Pemberton was an Anglican clergyman and amateur rosarian who set out to breed 'old fashioned' roses. The resulting Hybrid Musks include 'Felicia' and 'Penelope'. On his death, the nursery passed to his gardener J.A. Bentall, who produced 'Buff Beauty' and the Polyantha 'The Fairy'.
- Lord Penzance was a noted British judge and rose breeder, creating among others the varieties 'Lady Penzance' and 'Jeanie Deans'.
- Jean Pernet, père (1832–1896) was an important French rose breeder from Lyon who developed Hybrid Perpetual and Bourbon roses. His father, Claude Pernet established the World's first exhibition of roses. His notable roses include the Moss variety 'Louis Gimard' and the Hybrid Perpetual 'Baronne Adolphe de Rothschild'.
- Joseph Pernet-Ducher (1859–1928) was one the first rose breeders to focus on developing the new Hybrid Tea class. He developed the first yellow Hybrid tea rose and the class of roses known as "Pernetiana roses" His introductions include 'Madame Caroline Testout' and 'Soleil d'Or'- forerunner of 20th century yellow and orange roses.
- Poulsen, the Danish rose dynasty, was established in 1878 by Dorus Theus Poulsen (1851–1925) and originally focused on breeding roses hardy enough to withstand the Scandinavian climate. Later introductions notable for their form and colour include 'Chinatown' (1963) and 'Ingrid Bergman' (1984). The nursery developed a number of successful ground cover (landscape) roses, including 'Kent' (1988). Today, Poulsen Roser A/S is managed by the founder's great-granddaughter Pernille and her husband Mogens Olesen.

== R ==
- Joseph Rambaux (1820–1878) was a French rose breeder, who is best known for developing the Polyantha, Rosa 'Perle d'Or' and is considered the patriarch of the Meilland family of rose breeders and growers.
- Frank Riethmuller (1884–1965) was an Australian rose breeder, known to have released 26 roses of which ten are still available, while many have been lost.
- Rose Barni in Tuscany specialises in roses for Mediterranean climates. Notable successes include 'Castore' and 'Polluce', and striped varieties such as 'Rinascimento' and 'Missoni'.
- Rosen Tantau is a German rose breeding company founded in 1906 by Mathias Tantau sen. (1882–1953). His son Mathias Tantau jun. (1912–2006) led the nursery until 1985, when it was sold to Hans-Jürgen Evers (1940–2007), whose son Christian Evers is managing the company today. Notable cultivars developed by Rosen Tantau include 'Polarstern', 'Super Star' and 'Fragrant Cloud'.

== S ==
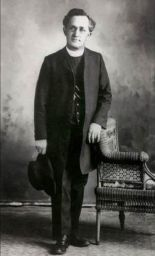
George Schoener (1864–1941)

- George Schoener was a Roman Catholic priest known for his experiments in rose breeding, especially in the use of wild species. Only two of his creations survive today: 'Arrilaga' and 'Schoener's Nutkana'.
- Jean Soupert was a Luxembourg-born floriculturist, who specialized in breeding rose cultivars, working with Pierre Notting in "Soupert & Notting".
- Suzuki Seizo was a Japanese rose breeder and director of the Keisei Rose Research Institute since 1958. His international successes include 'Olympic Torch', 'Mikado' and 'Ferdy'.
- Dr. Felicitas Svejda (1920–2016) was a Canadian agricultural scientist who developed roses that could survive Canada's short growing season and harsh winters. She developed the Explorer Rose Series named in honour of Canadian explorers.

== T ==
- Mathias Tantau is a rose breeding company located at Uetersen, Germany. Founded in 1906, it has introduced some 350 cultivars and is responsible for popular roses such as 'Super Star' (1960), 'Fragrant Cloud' (1963) and 'Black Magic' (1997).
- George Clifford Thomas (1873–1932) was an American golf course architect, botanist and author, who began breeding roses on Bloomfield Farm in 1912, cultivating over thousand varieties and creating some new hybrids, e.g. 'Bloomfield Abundance'.
- George Thomson is a Scottish-born South Australian rose breeder of over 50 cultivars, including 'Crown Princess Mary' (2006), 'Mawson' (2001) and 'Howard Florey' (1998).

== V ==
- Jean-Pierre Vibert was a prolific early rose hybridizer, responsible for many older roses still found in gardens today. 'Aimee Vibert' (1828), one of his Noisettes, was named for his daughter.
- Dr. Walter van Fleet worked for the US Department of Agriculture, focusing on crops, but also developing roses designed to thrive in the American climate. His introductions include 'American Pillar' and 'Dr W. Van Fleet'. After his death, his seedlings – including 'Mary Wallace', 'Breeze Hill' and 'Glenn Dale' – were introduced by the American Rose Society as 'dooryard climbers'.
- Verein Deutscher Rosenfreunde, a German society of rose breeders

== See also ==
- List of rose cultivars named after people
- List of Award of Garden Merit roses
- World Federation of Rose Societies
- Rose Hall of Fame
- Rose of the Year
- ADR rose
- Rose trial grounds
