= Marie Henrieta Chotek =

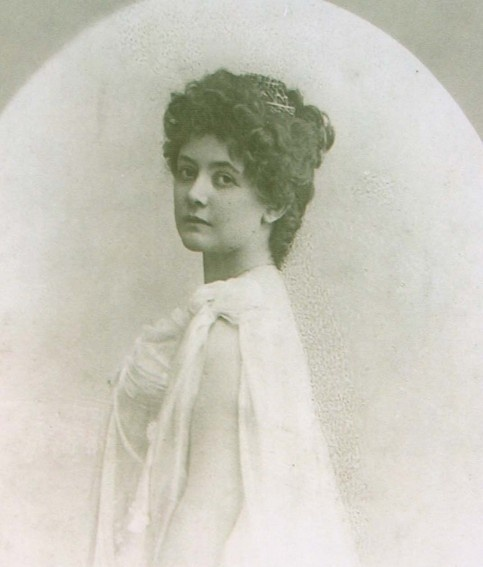
- Born: 24 November 1863; Dolná Krupá, Austria-Hungary (now Slovakia)
- Died: 13 February 1946 (aged 82); Dolná Krupá, Czechoslovakia (now Slovakia)
- Occupation: Rosarian

Countess Henrieta Hermína Rudolfína Ferdinanda Marie Antonie Anna Chotková of Chotkov and Vojnín – (known as Marie Henrieta Chotek or Marie-Henriette Chotek - Slovak: Mária Henrieta Choteková) - (1863–1946), also known as the countess of roses, was a grower of roses, who established the rosarium of Dolná Krupá (Slovakia),

== The Dolná Krupá mansion ==
The village of Dolná Krupá is located in the Danubian Hills at the foot of the Little Carpathians in the Krupá River valley. The development of the Dolná Krupá estate started when it entered in the possession of Michael II Brunswick (1671–1719) as he married Hungarian noblewoman, Margarethe Maria Theresia Vitalis de Vitalisfalva, the newlyweds choosing the property as their residence. In 1749–1756, their son, Anton Brunswick, built the first baroque mansion, designed by the viennese architect Johann Baptist Martinelli. On 7 October 1775 empress Maria Terezia of Austria awarded Anton Brunswick the title of count Brunswick of Korompa.

After Anton's death, in 1780, the estate was inherited by his son, Jozef Brunswick (1750–1827), who appointed architect Johann Joseph Thalherr to renovate the mansion, the works being carried out from 1782 to 1796. The renovation significantly increased the size of the building but kept the baroque style of the mansion. An orangery and other annex buildings were constructed. In 1813 Jozef Brunswick asked architect Anton Pius Riegel to procure several old statues from Rome for the ornamentation of the mansion and of the park, in order to enhance its classical appearance. At the same time, from 1813 to 1819, landscaping architect Christian Heinrich Nebbien created an English garden covering 100 hectares with many ponds. Other extensions and renovations were made from 1822 to 1828. The mansion was considered to be one of the most attractive residences of the aristocracy in Slovakia. Are informaţii suplimentare

Jozef Brunswick was a friend of composer Ludwig van Beethoven who was his guest at the Dolná Krupá mansion from 1797 - 1806. A small building near the entrance to the park, called the ‘’Beethoven House’’ is claimed to be the place where the composer lived during his stay. This is where he composed the (Sonata No. 14, (Moonlight Sonata). At present, a Beethoven Museum is located in the house.

In 1813, Countess Henrietta Brunsvick de Korompa, daughter of Count Jozef Brunswick, married count Hermann Chotek von Chotkow und Wognin (1786–1822) and received the Dolná Krupá as dowry. The Choteks were an old Czech aristocratic family. Sophie Chotek, wife of Archduke Franz Ferdinand of Austria, was a cousin of Maria Henrietta's.

Herman Chotek died in 1822. In the following years, the estate stayed in the possession of the counts Chotek, first Herman's son, Rudolf Chotek, and thereafter Maria Henrietta Chotek (1863–1945).

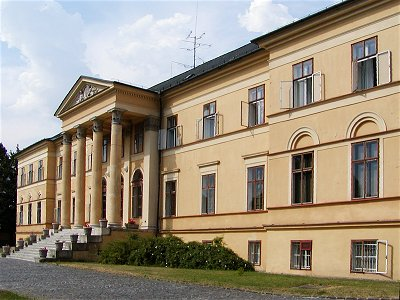
Countes Chotek's mansion in Dolná Krupá

== Maria Henrietta Chotek and the beginning of the Dolná Krupá rose garden ==
Countess Maria Henrietta Chotek was born on 24 November 1863. Maria Henrietta was a lonely person. She never married and though she was very wealthy and was part of the Austro-Hungarian high aristocracy she never wanted to go to the imperial court, even after her cousin had married the Crown prince. Maria Henrietta enjoyed her residence in Dolná Krupá where she could devote all her time to her only passion: growing roses.

For a long time after her death, villagers remembered her as a friendly person, fluent in the local Slovak, who participated to village festivities where she dressed in local clothes. Countess Maria Henrietta participated in local charities, generously supporting orphans and abandoned children.

In the 1890s, when she inherited the Dolna Krupa estate, she decided to create a rosarium in the mansion's park, able to compete with the major rose gardens of the such as the Roseraie de L'Haÿ in France and Rosarium of Sangerhausen (at present called Europa Rosarium) in Germany. She was personally involved in breeding her roses and carried out experiments of improving rose species and developing new cultivars.

Well known rosarians such as Peter Lambert, Wilhelm Kordes, Hermann Kiese, Johannes Böttner und Rudolf Geschwind were proud of being her friends and appreciated not only her competence but her unselfish help. In 1909 Pope Pius X awarded her a diploma of appreciation.

Countess Chotek was an important member of the Verein Deutscher Rosenfreunde – VDR (Union of German Friends of Roses), which had been created in 1903. She actively participated in various congresses of rose-breeders, where her rosarium was seen as one of the first three in Europe. In 1910, at the Liegnitz (today Legnica in Silesia) congress, count Carl Friedrich von Pückler-Burghauss, mentioned the three rosaria by stating: "Today chains of roses link Germany with France and Austria-Hungary". Countess Marie Henrieta Chotek was known as the "countess of roses". She is still mentioned under this name in works on the history of rose breeding.

Her enthusiasm regarding roses was remarkable. Peter Lambert states that during an exhibition in Liegnitz Henrieta Chotek was so impressed by a rambling rose cultivar named "Fragezeichen" (Question Mark) presented by Johannes Böttner, that she left for Frankfurt as soon as the congress was over in order to be able to admire the new rose cultivars in all their splendor.

In 1910, after Rudolf Geschwind's death, countess Chotek acquired his entire collection of roses, thus ensuring the preservation of the genetic patrimony created by Geschwindt. She sent two of her employees to supervise the packing and transportation of the roses, which were thereafter transplanted to a special section of her rosarium. She thus acquired over 2,000 plants, including some cultivars which had not yet been on the market. It is due to those efforts that some of Geschwind's creations are present in Sangerhausen and other today's rosaria.

The Dolná Krupá rosarium was a pride of the Union of German Friends of Roses, and, in 1914, at the Rose Congress of Zweibrücken, rosarian Hermann Kiese presented an enthusiastic description of the rosarium which he had visited a short time before. The Zweibrücken Congress was the last major event organized by the Union and a recognition of Countess Chotek's achievements. Only a few days after the closure of the congress, on 28 June 1914 Archduke Franz Ferdinand, Austria-Hungary's crownprince and his wife Sophie (Marie Henrieta's cousin) were Assassination of Archduke Franz Ferdinand of Austria in Saraevo. This marked not only the beginning of World War I but also the end of an era. From this moment, countess Chotek's and her rosarium's fates started their inexorable decline.

During World War I, countess Chotek gave up her gardening and worked as a nurse, taking care of wounded soldiers, working in the hospital of Tyrnau (now Trnava). When she returned to her estate, at the end of the war, her rosarium was completely destroyed. The Austro-Hungarian monarchy had ceased to exist, Unter Krompach was not called Alsókorompa but had taken the name of Dolná Krupá and the little village was now part of Czechoslovakia.

== Decline of the Dolná Krupá rosarium ==
After the end of the war, countess Marie Henrieta Chotek started to work on rebuilding her rosarium. But, after the war, the number of those interested in roses or who could afford such an activity had dramatically declined. In order to revive the interest for the roses she loved so dearly, besides working on her rosarium, she also established in Dolná Krupá a school for rose growing.

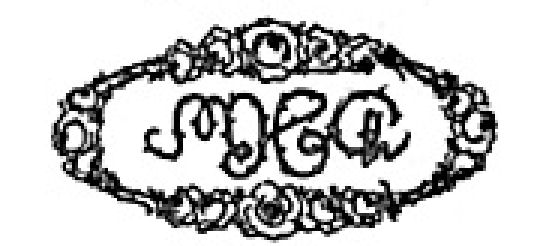
Monogram of Countess Marie Henrieta Chotek

Dr. Gustav Brada, a Czech horticulturist also specializing in growing roses, who visited Dolná Krupá in 1921, stated that the rosarium had been extremely damaged during the war and that the loss of some rare rose cultivars was practically impossible to overcome. The only rose garden which had not suffered due to the war was the Roseraie de L'Haÿ in France and the successors of Jules Gravereau, who were in charge of the rosarium were not inclined to help competition develop in the countries defeated during the war. Also, rebuilding the rose garden required important investments and countess Marie Henrieta Chotek did not have the means in the difficult economic conditions after the war.

Rose growing required much labor as the according to the procedures used in the 1920s, roses had to be replanted every 4–5 years, in order to avoid the depletion of the nutrient qualities of the soil. After the roses were removed, the plots were covered with manure and for one year potatoes were grown. The following years beans or peas were grown after which the plots had to be ploughed deeply before roses could be replanted. These procedures were very expensive.

However, when Gustav Brada visited Dolná Krupá again, in 1927, he could assess that countess Marie Henrieta Chotek had succeeded in rebuilding a model rosarium, which, according to him, was an important attraction in Slovakia. The catalog printed by the rosarium listed 885 different cultivars, including 228 climbing roses, 33 Bourbon roses and 210 garden roses, the rest being so-called noble roses. The rosarium also created new cultivars, the most important being a "Nordlandrose II", an improvement of one of Rudolf Geschwind's creations. The last important creations included in the catalog were "Phaenomen" in 1933 and "Ignis" in 1934.

However these successes were superficial. The rosarium never regained the richness and the size it had in 1914, before the war. Countess Marie Henrieta Chotek was in idealist, who had an outstanding knowledge in rose breeding, who loved roses above anything in the world but who had few skills as a businesswoman. Her rose breeding school ran into financial difficulties. She was already 70 years old and did not have the intellectual and physical energy to carry on her work all by herself. She had helped others all her life but now when she needed help she could get it from nowhere. She could not maintain her rosarium any longer and both she and her rosarium were aging rapidly.

In 1934, at the inauguration of the rose garden on the Petřín Hill in Prague, professor Karl Domin had to concede:

"The Dolná Krupá rosarium is far from what it was some time ago. The park is gradually being destroyed. Large parts of the park are being cultivated with potatoes and corn, to ensure the means of survival. The old countess lives alone in her large palace. However, the few visitors she still has can still feel how great her love of roses is."

However, changes occurred not only in Dolná Krupá. In 1934 the Union of German Friends of Roses was merged into the third section of the German Society for Horticulture and the headquarters moved to Berlin. It was one of the measures taken by the authorities of the Third Reich to gain control over various professional organizations. The publication of the magazines of the Union of German Friends of Roses was also discontinued and replaced by the printing of year books. The 1938 year book is the last mentioning the Dolná Krupá rosarium.

After the Division of Czechoslovakia and the beginning of World War II nobody was interested in roses any more. Due to the war, manpower for the rose garden was scarce and every year the rosarium fell into a worse state. Towards the end of the war the palace was ransacked by the Red Army and the park was destroyed. The cottage in which the countess was living in those days, called the "Swiss mansion", was completely demolished by the villagers who used the bricks as building materials to repair their own houses. Countess Marie Henrieta Chotek, old, sick and completely destitute, had to rely on the charity of the villagers in order to survive. On 13 February 1946, at age 83, the countess of the roses died while being cared for by the nuns of a neighboring monastery.

Marie Henrieta Chotek was buried in the family mausoleum, located in the graveyard next to the parrish church of Dolná Krupá. The mausoleum had been built in 1895 by her father, Rudolf Chotek, and had been spared by the war.

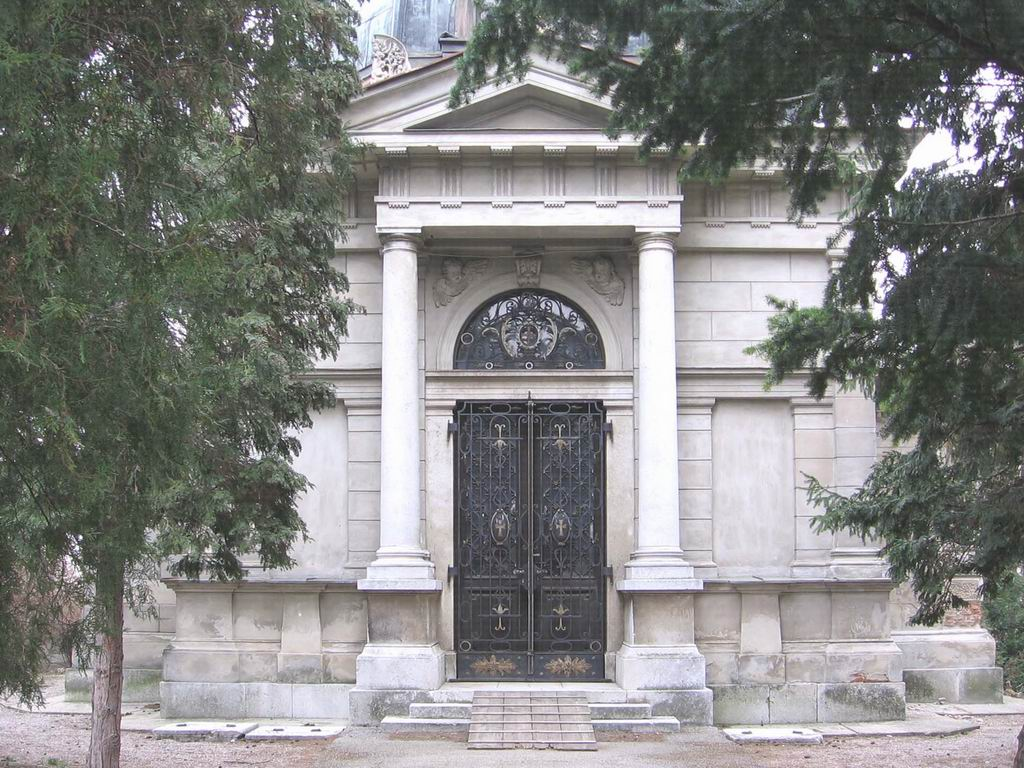
The Chotek family mausoleum in the Dolná Krupá cemetery, where countess Marie Henrieta Chotek is interred

== Legacy ==
All the properties of the Chotek family were nationalized by the Czechoslovak communist authorities. The palace was converted into a psychiatric hospital which operated from 1949 to 1969. In 1969 it was converted into a retreat for Slovak writers and consequently became a museum. It still has this destination.

Nothing was left of the rosarium which had once been one of the finest in the world. The land was converted into agricultural land. The socialist economy needed crop production, not roses.

In the 1990s, German horticulturist Johannes Kalbus attempted to revive the tradition, by donating various precious rose cultivars to the Dolná Krupá domain. A new rosarium was created in Dolná Krupá in memory of the one which had belonged to Marie Henrieta Chotek. The new rosarium is sponsored by the Club of Rose Lovers of Slovakia ("Rosa Club"). Starting 1993 at the beginning of June the rosarium organizes an exhibition "The beauty of roses and of forms". Periodically seminars discussiong "Roses in human life" are organized. But the name of Maria Henrietta Chotekova, who established rose breeding in Dolná Krupá, seems to be forgotten is not mentioned any more.

Several rosarians have dedicat their roses to Marie Henrieta Chotek:

- Gräfin Chotek created by Hermann Kiese in 1910;
- Marie Henriette Gräfin Chotek created by Peter Lambert in 1911;
- Comtesse Maria Henrietta (Győry, 2006)
- Rosengräfin Marie Henriette (Kordes 2013)

The cultivar created by Hermann Kiese in 1910 still survives and exists in the rosarium of Sangerhausen. And thus, the name of countess Marie Henrieta Chotek remains closely linked to the Union of Rose Lovers of Germany and reminds viewers of times long gone when roses alone could be the purpose of life. https://commons.wikimedia.org/wiki/File:M._H._Gr%C3%A4fin_Chotek-Lambert.jpg https://commons.wikimedia.org/wiki/File:C_S.Gy%C5%91ry_Comtesse_Maria_Henrietta_2006.jpg https://commons.wikimedia.org/wiki/File:Rosengr%C3%A4fin_Marie_Henriette.jpg

Rose "Gräfin Chotek" created by Hermann Kiese

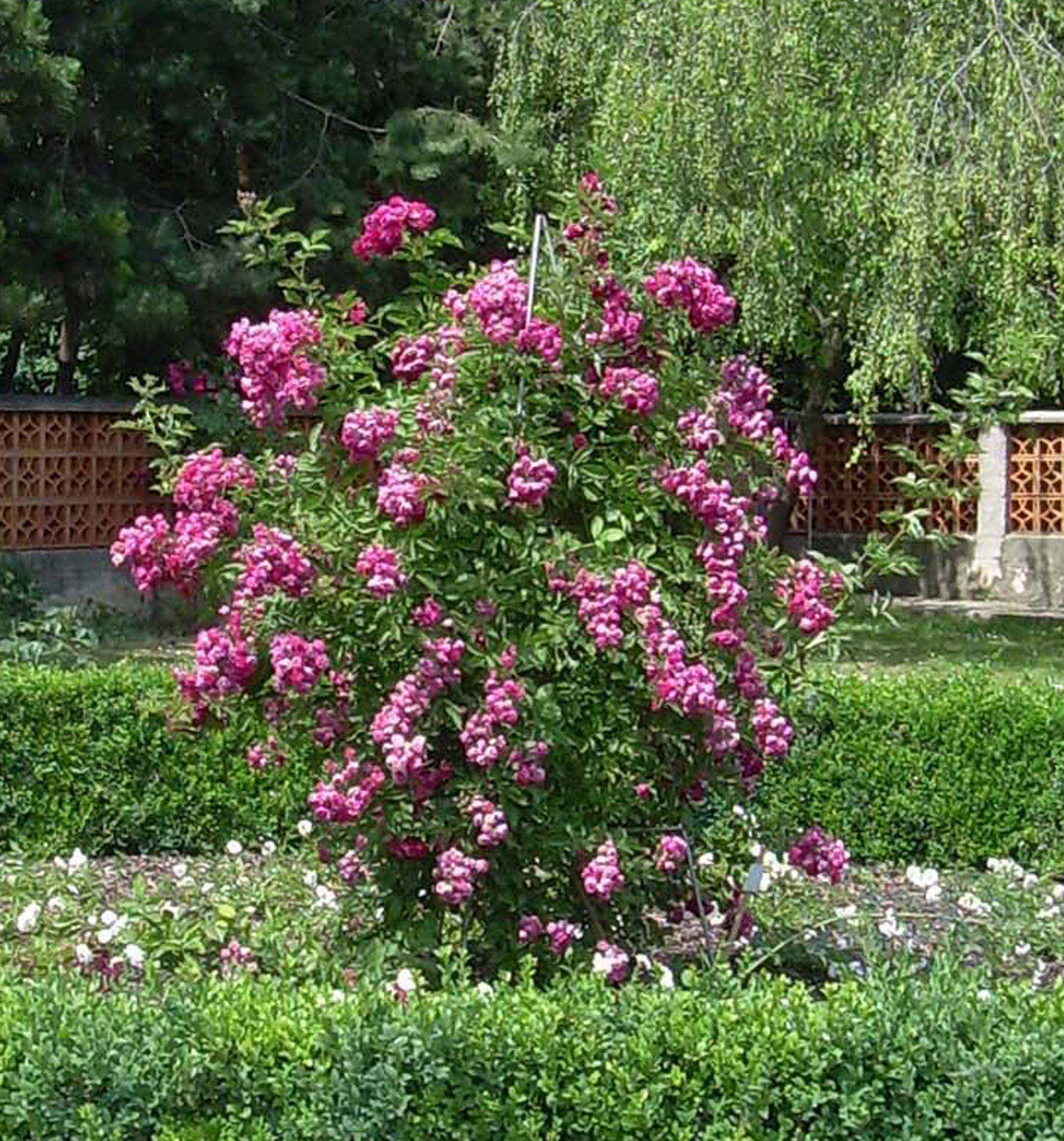
Marie Heriette Gräfin Chotek-Lambert 1911

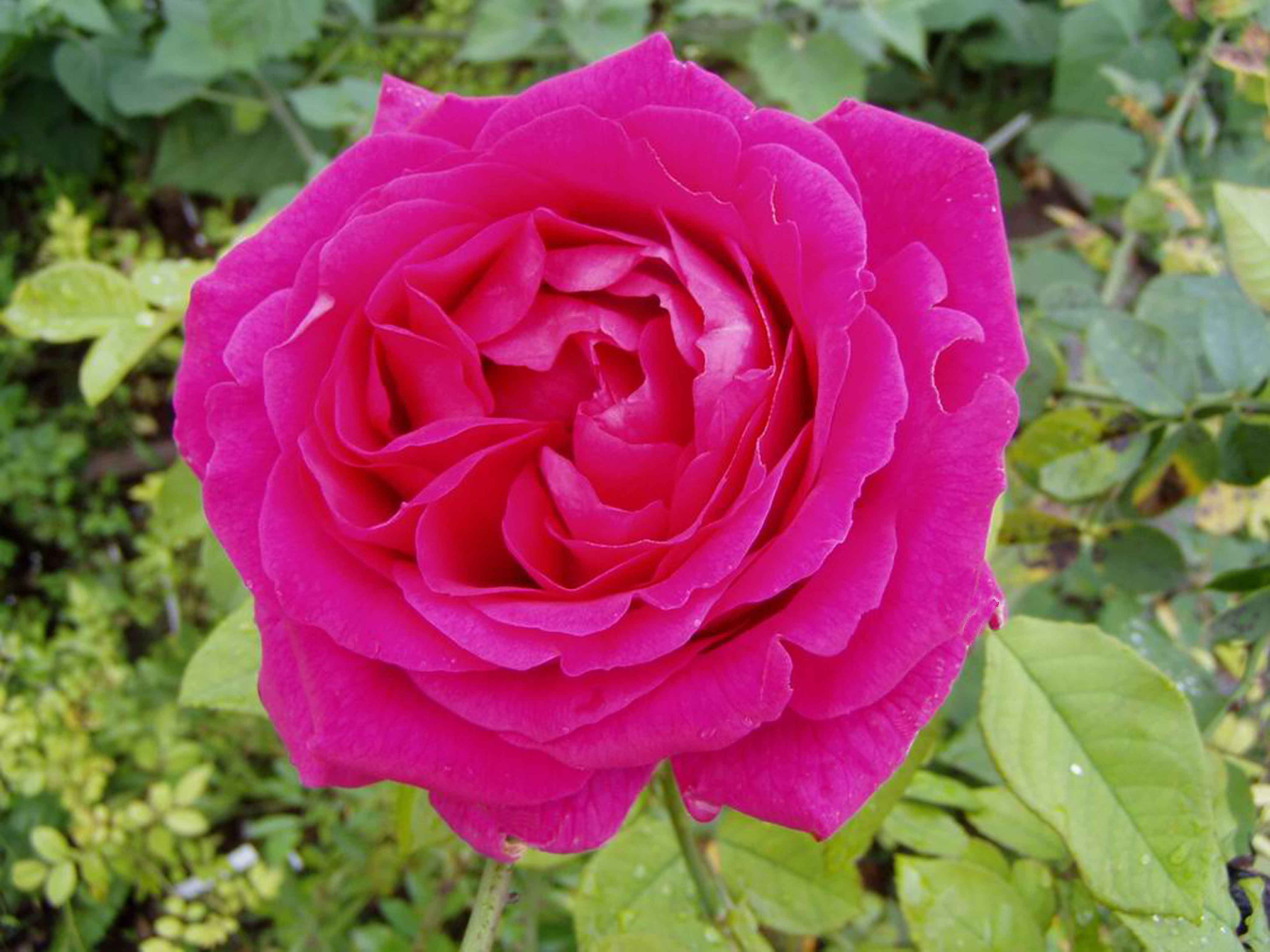
Comtesse Maria Henrietta Sz. Győry 2006
