= Bottner =

Bottner or Böttner is a German surname. Notable people with the surname include:

- Andrea Bottner (born 1971), American lawyer and diplomat
- Barbara Bottner, American author and artist
- Johannes Böttner (1861–1919), German horticulturist
- Lorenza Böttner (1959–1994), German-Chilean multidisciplinary artist
