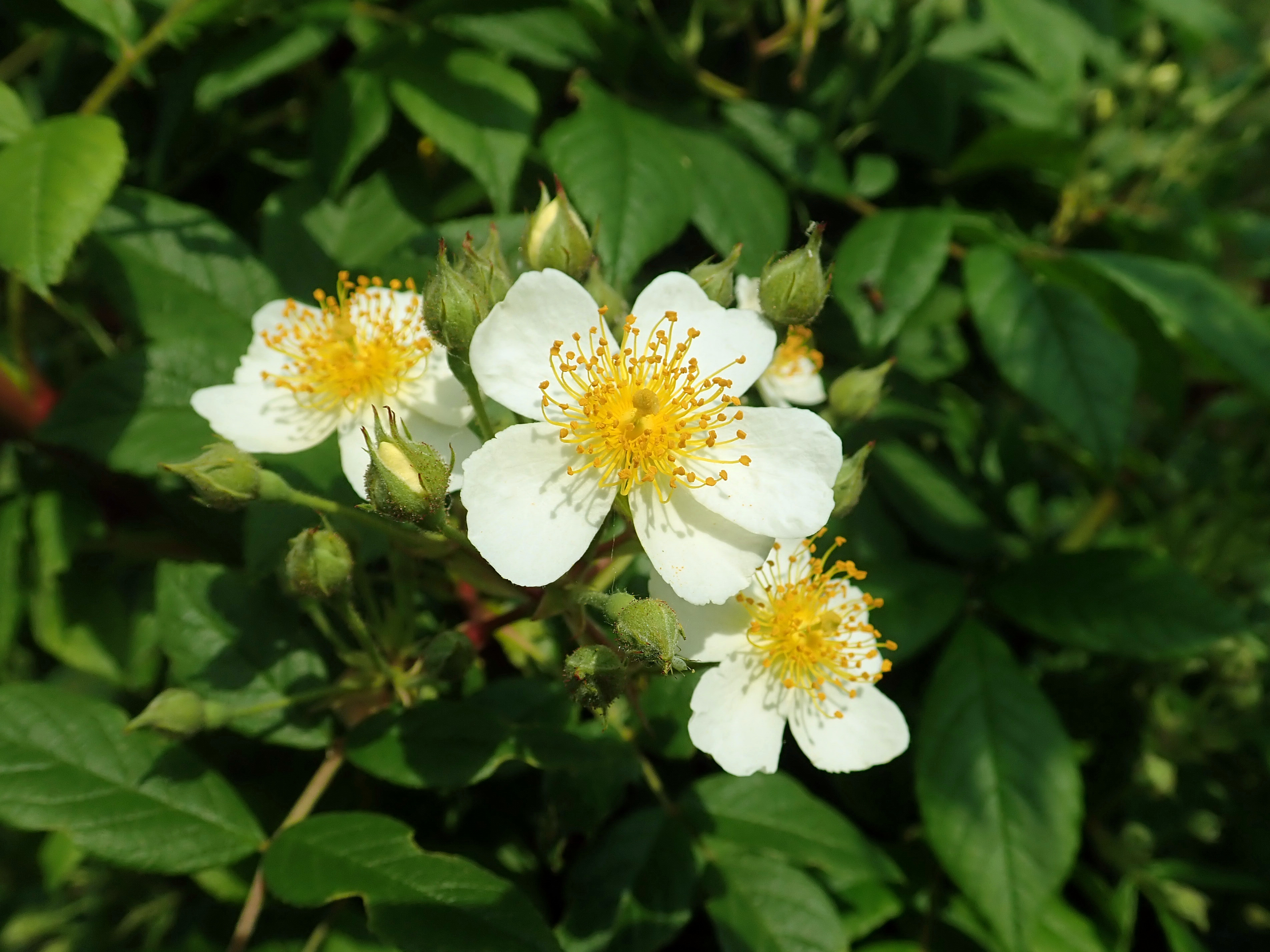
- Close-up of inflorescence
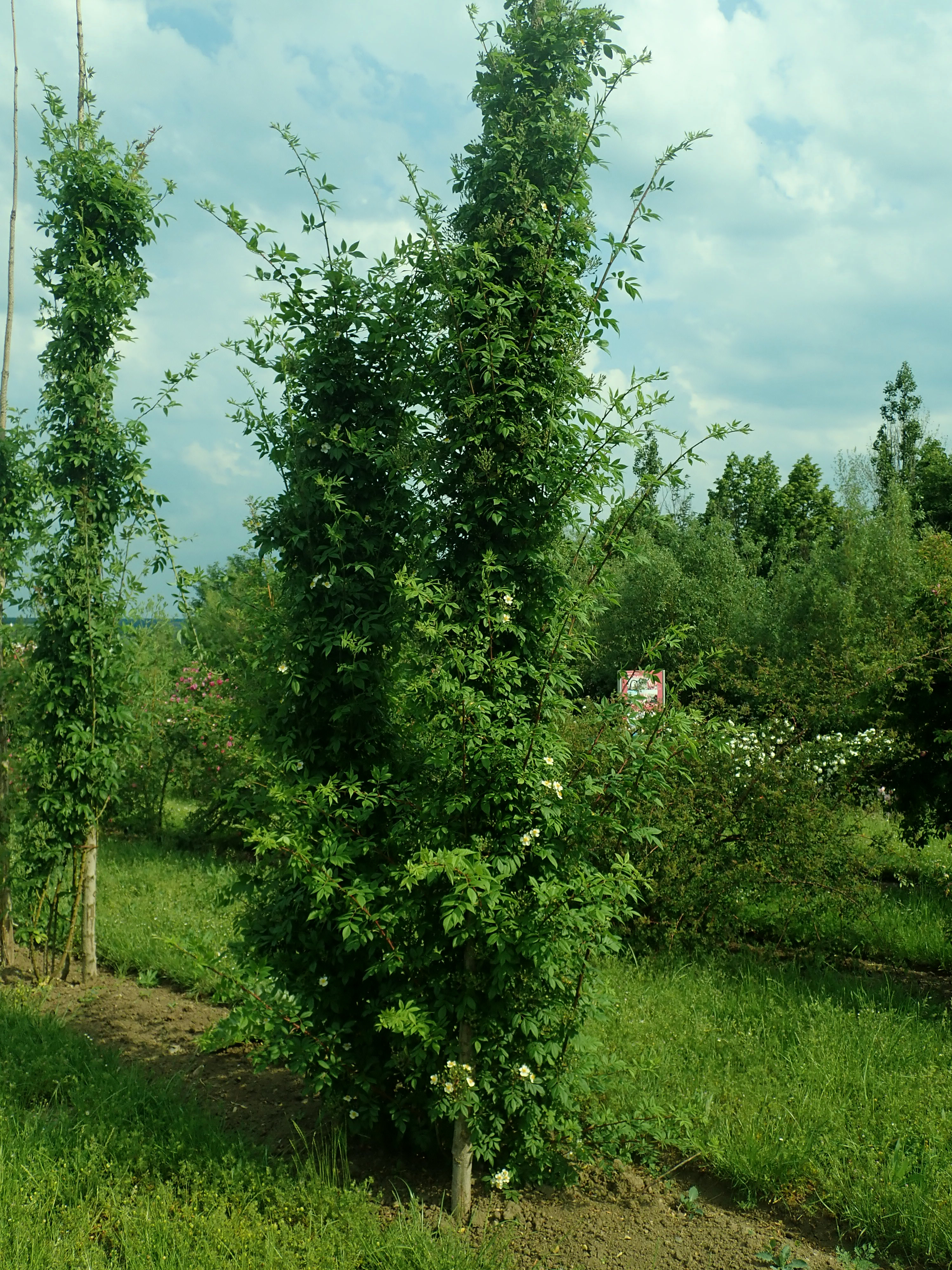
- At the Europa-Rosarium

Scientific classification
- Kingdom: Plantae
- Clade: Embryophytes
- Clade: Tracheophytes
- Clade: Spermatophytes
- Clade: Angiosperms
- Clade: Eudicots
- Clade: Rosids
- Order: Rosales
- Family: Rosaceae
- Genus: Rosa
- Species: R. glomerata

Binomial name
- Rosa glomerata Rehder & E.H.Wilson

= Rosa glomerata =

Species of plant

Rosa glomerata is a species of flowering plant in the family Rosaceae. It is native to south-central China and northern Myanmar. A liana reaching 9 m (30 ft), it is typically found growing in forest edges, thickets, slopes, and scrublands at elevations from 1,300 to 3,000 m (4,300 to 9,800 ft). A 2025 molecular study of nuclear and chloroplast DNA found that it is a good species. The Royal Horticultural Society considers it a good plant to attract pollinators and "ideal" for growing up a supporting tree.
