= George Robert Knight =

Australian rose breeder

George Robert Knight (1879–1961) was an Australian rose breeder. He retains four of his roses in Australian public collections.

== Life ==
George Robert Knight, born 17 June 1879 at Concord, New South Wales, was the son of John Knight, publican of the Horse and Jockey hotel, Homebush. George started work in a rose nursery at the age of 12. At 18 he started his own nursery, later known as George Knight & Sons, in Parramatta Road, Homebush, New South Wales Homebush. The nursery eventually also had 40 acres of land in Meurants Lane, Parklea; 10 acres in Greenwood Road, Kellyville; and 10 acres in Old Windsor Road, Parklea.

Knight himself had three nurseryman sons, in order George John, Henry Frederick and Clifton Robert.

He was a friend of fellow Australian breeders Alister Clark and Olive Fitzhardinge and fellow NSW rose-nurserymen the Hazelwood Brothers.

== Rose breeding ==
George Knight bred seven known roses, listed below. They were released for sale through his own nursery.

'Mother's Day' is still sold in the U.S. as was 'Nigger Boy', though "this was regarded as an offensive title in America and the listing of the rose or even the mention of it in the daily press caused racial troubles in the States." The controversy was fanned by the rose's American promoter, Roy Hennessey.

The Australian registrar of roses and president of the National Rose Society of Victoria was A.S. Thomas. The 1967 edition of his Better Roses prints a list of eighty "highly prized cultivars" from Australia and New Zealand. Twenty of them are roses by Alister Clark. Seven are by Frank Riethmuller. Two are by George Knight: 'Mother's Day' and 'Nigger Boy'.

=== Sortable list of George Robert Knight roses ===
Name	Date	Type	Colour	Seed parent	Pollen parent	Extant
Beauty of New South Wales	1932	Polyantha	Red, white centre	Orléans Rose	Alice Amos	Yes
Dainty Dawn	1932	Polyantha	Light pink	Amaury Fonseca	Annchen Müller	Lost
Little Princess	1937	Polyantha	Orange	Unknown	Unknown	Unknown
Miss Australia	1931	Hybrid tea	Pink	Dame Edith Helen	Madame Segond Weber	Yes
Mother's Day	1937	Hybrid tea	White with pink	Unknown	Unknown	Yes
Nigger Boy	1931	Hybrid tea	Dark red	Hadley	Yves Druhen	Yes
Peter Pan	1935	Hybrid tea	Crimson	Unknown	Unknown	Lost

=== Where the roses can be seen ===
- 'Beauty of NSW' is in the rose gardens at Budatéteny in Hungary.
- 'Miss Australia' is in Adelaide Botanic Gardens and at Europa-Rosarium at Sangerhausen in Germany.
- 'Mother's Day' is commercially available in England, Canada and the U.S. but extinct in Australia.

=== Articles written by Knight ===
- George Robert Knight,"Tea roses in NSW", Australian Rose Annual, 1931, p. 10
- George Robert Knight, "New roses in 1933", Australian Rose Annual, 1933, p. 114
