= Rudolf Geschwind =

Austrian rose breeder

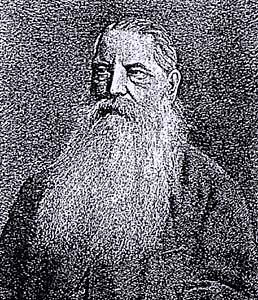
Rudolf Geschwind (1829–1910)

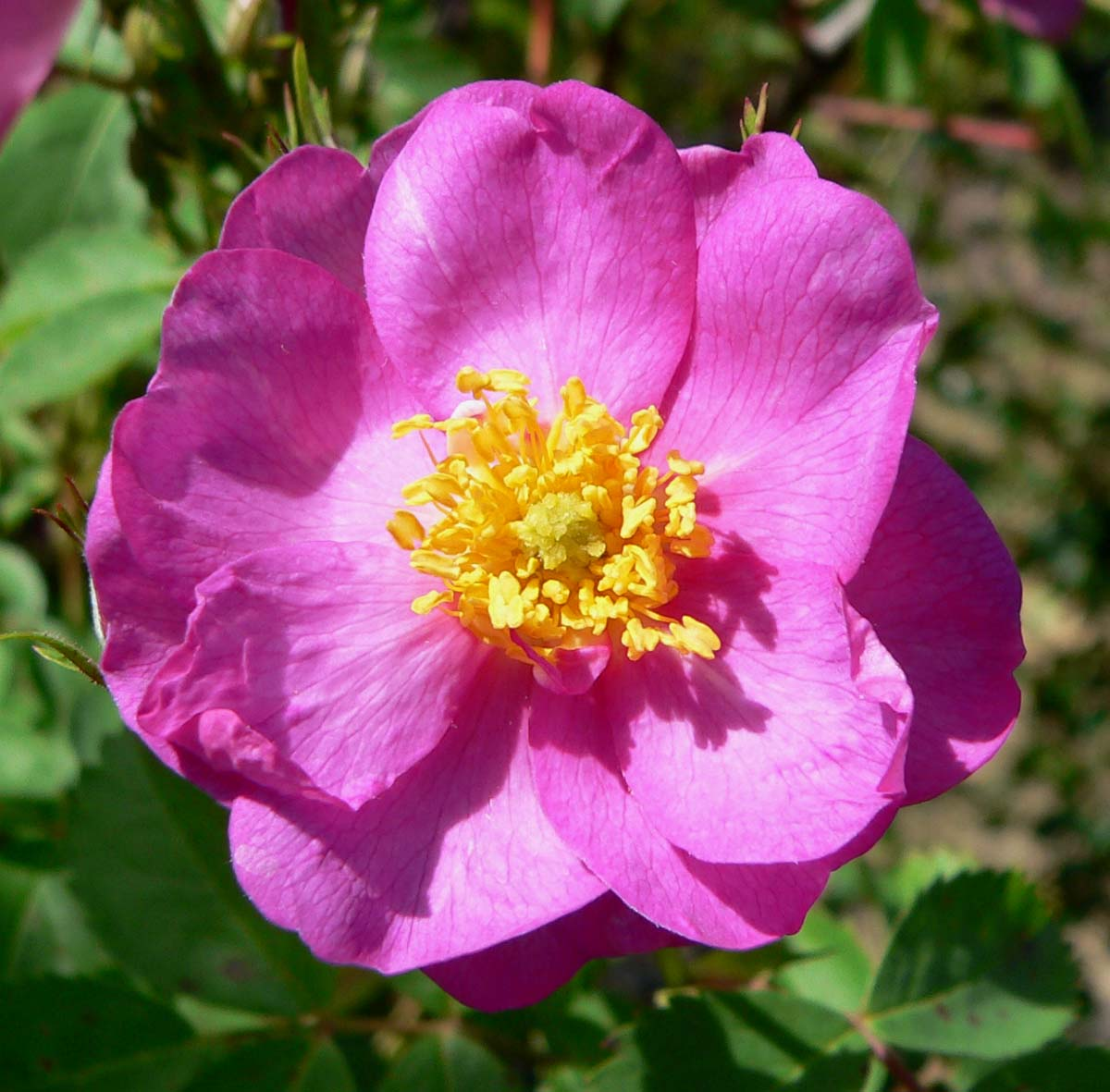
'Theano', 1895

Rudolf Geschwind (born 29 August 1829 in Hředle, Bohemia, Austro-Hungary – today Czech Republic – died 30 August 1910 in Karpfen, Austro-Hungary, Krupina, today Slovakia was a German Austrian rosarian known for his breeding of rose cultivars.

== Studies and professional activities ==
Interested in growing plants even in his childhood, Rudolf Geschwind pursued his studies for two years at the Technical University in Prague. He then continued his studies at the Academy for Forestry in Schemnitz today Banska Stiavnica în Slovakia, graduating in 1852. He then started working for the Austro-Hungarian Department of Forestry. His work was carried out in various parts of the Austro-Hungarian empire, on the territory of today's Italy, Ukraine, Poland, Czech Republic, Slovakia and Hungary

However, his hobby was the breeding of roses. From 1860 to 1910 he created around 140 rose cultivars, most of them resistant to frost. He acquired international fame during the Exposition Universelle (1889) in Paris, where he presented his collection of climbing roses.

After his death, in 1910, his entire collection of cultivars was purchased by countess Marie Henrieta Chotek for her rosarium in Dolná Krupá.

== Rose cultivars created by Rudolf Geschwind ==
Rose cultivars created by Rudolf Geschwind
Year	Name of cultivar	Year	Name of cultivar	Year	Name of cultivar
1860	Premier Essai	1890	Trompeter von Säckingen	1900	Pescheräh
1867	Dr. Hurta	1890	Rigoletto	1900	Eugen E. Marlitt
1882	Anna Geschwind	1890	Ovid	1900	Satanella
1884	Geschwinds Nordlandrose	1890	Wodan	1900	Leopold Ritter
1886	Lios Alpha	1890	Anna Scharsach	1900	Gräfin Chotek
1886	Mme Richter	1890	Gipsy Blood	1900	Julia Festilla
1886	Forstmeisters Heim	1890	Alpenfee	1900	Josephine Ritter
1886	Fatinitza	1890	Elbfex	1900	Geschwinds Unermüdliche
1886	Mercedes	1890	Dr. Valentin Teirich	1900	Geschwinds Schönste
1886	Souvenir de Brod	1890	Amneris	1902	Obergärtner Franz Joost
1886	Schloß Luegg	1890	Andor	1902	Wenzel Geschwind
1886	Nymphe Tepla	1890	Antonie Schurz	1905	Lady Gray
1886	Kleiner Postillon	1890	Corporal Johann Nagy	1909	Gipsy Boy
1886	Décoration de Geschwind	1890	Chloris	1909	Azalea
1886	Ännchen von Tharau	1890	Erinnerung an meinem Vater	1909	Wicking
1886	Wassilissa	1890	Fantasca	1909	Walküre
1886	Aurelia Liffa	1890	Julius Fabianics de Misefa	1909	Alice Rauch
1886	Erlkönig	1890	Lydia Geschwind	1909	Asta von Parpart
1887	Manetti purpurea	1890	Picotte	1909	Parkzierde
1887	Manetti alba rosea	1890	Hauptmann A. Steinsdorfer	1910	Wachhilde
1887	Manetti floribunda	1890	Ulana	1910	Siwa
1887	Loreley	1891	Dryade	1910	Freya
1887	Caecilie Scharsach	1891	Nymphe Egeria	Commercialized after Geschwind’s death	
1887	Meteor	1892	Erinnerung an Schloß Scharfenstein	1912	Hermione
1887	Gilda	1892	Lydia	1912	Prinz Hirzeprinzchen
1887	Rotkäppchen	1894	Schneelicht	1912	Asra
1887	Dora	1895	Fontäne	1912	Rote Beka
1887	Eurydice	1895	Himmelsauge	1912	Ariana El
1887	Virago	1895	Griseldis	1912	Fatma
1887	Fiametta	1895	Lisdana	1912	Astra
1888	Kobold	1895	Theano	1913	Geisha
1888	Erebus	1895	Niobe	1928	Geschwinds Multiflora
1888	Erinnerung an meine Mutter	1895	Meigela	1928	Geschwinds Gorgeous
1888	Ernst G. Dörell	1895	Nora	Year of commercialization unknown	
1888	Ernst Willner	1895	Phaedra		Arva Leany
1888	Major Franz Teirich	1895	Irrlicht		Majthenyi
1888	Esmeralda	1895	Vineta		Frau Dr. E. Skibinska
1888	Tartarus	1895	Crémé		
1888	Terror	1895	Cyclop		
1888	Frau Viktoria von Thusansky	1895	Geranium		
1889	Graziella	1895	Gelon		
1889	Gruß an Wien	1895	Feuerkugel		
1889	Herzblättchen	1895	Zacharula-rubrifolia		
1889	Marie Geschwind	1895	Sylvia		
1889	Báró Natália	1897	Gruß an Teplitz		
1889	Stadkassierer Wilhelm Liffa	1897	Virginia R. Coxe		
1889	Caroline Bank				
1889	Marie Dermar				
