= Rosa 'Schoener's Nutkana' =

Rose cultivar

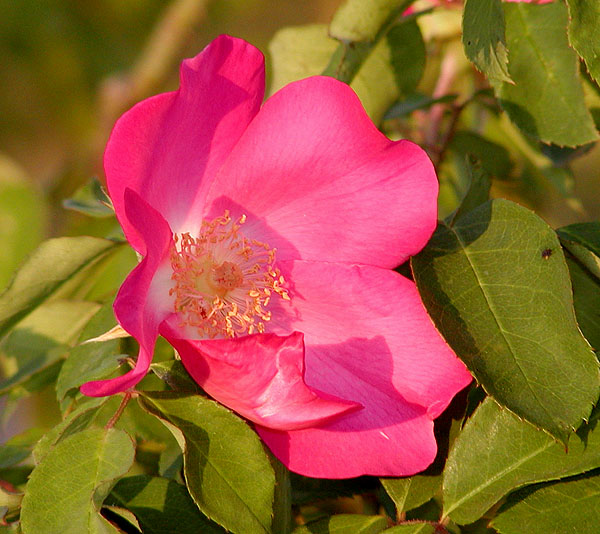
- Genus: Rosa hybrid
- Hybrid parentage: Rosa nutkana × 'Paul Neyron'
- Cultivar group: Hybrid Nutkana
- Cultivar: 'Schoener's Nutkana'
- Breeder: Georg Schoener
- Origin: US, 1930

Rosa 'Schoener's Nutkana' is a deep pink rose variety named after Father Georg Schöner (1864–1941), a priest who became a notable rose breeder, who developed this rose in 1930 as a cross between Rosa nutkana and the hybrid perpetual 'Paul Neyron' (Levet, 1869).

This hybrid nutkana is a shrub rose with large, single flowers, five-petalled but sometimes with another one or two, reaching an average diameter of 8 centimetres (3.1 in). Their colour is light to carmine-pink with a large circle of yellow stamens. The long-lasting flowers are moderately fragrant, develop from small, pointed buds, and appear in small clusters of two to five on short strong stems in a spring or summer flush with some scattered flowers later on. In autumn, the shrub sports rose hips.

The plant tends to be a tall, sprawling shrub, with very few thorns on its arching shoots and small light to medium grey-green foliage with seven leaflets. 'Schoener's Nutkana' can grow 250 centimetres (8.2 ft) high and 120 to 150 centimetres (3.9 to 4.9 ft) wide. The vigorous shrub tolerates half-shade and poorer soils, is very disease resistant and winter hardy down to −25 °C (USDA zone 5). It is well suited to form hedges.
