= Verein Deutscher Rosenfreunde =

Verein Deutscher Rosenfreunde - VDR (in English German Rose Society), since 2007 Gesellschaft Deutscher Rosenfreunde - GDR is an association of rosarians. It was created in 1903 for the promotion of new cultivars of roses, but was closed in 1934 under the Third Reich. The Union was reestablished in the 1980s.
