= Albert Hoffmann (horticulturist) =

Albert Hoffmann (1846–1924) was a German rosarian.

He was one of the founders of the "Sangerhausen Rosarium" (now Europa-Rosarium) donating over 4000 seedlings from his own nursery for the newly established rosarium. His "Alice Hoffman" cultivar is named after his daughter. Rosarian Nicola Welter dedicated him his cultivar called "Albert Hoffmann". A memorial stone in his honor is installed at the Sangerhausen Rosarium.
