= Jean-Pierre Vibert =

French rosarian

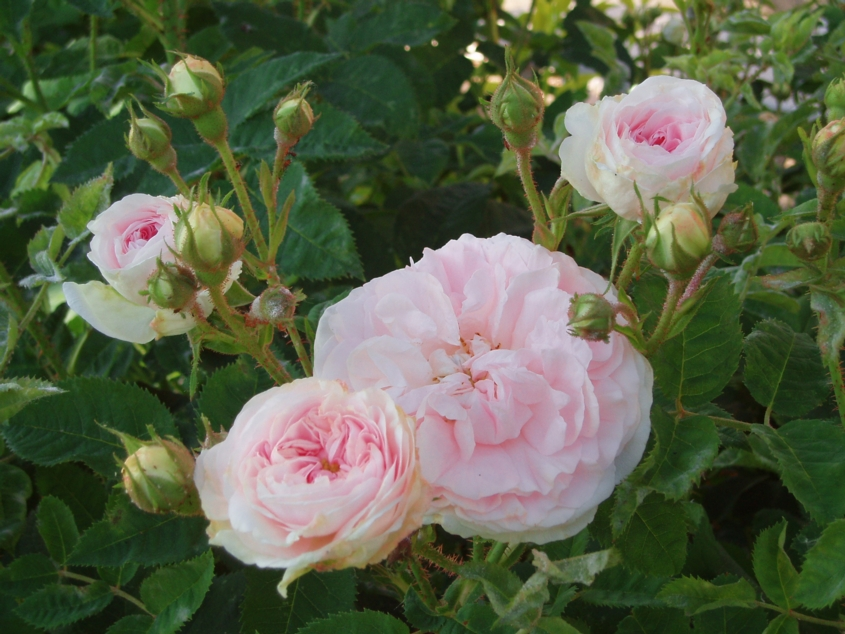

Jean Pierre Vibert (French: [ʒɑ̃ pjɛʁ vibɛʁ]; January 31, 1777 in Paris – January 18, 1866 in Paris) was a French rosarian.

== Biography ==
Vibert served as a young man in Napoleon's army. Disabled by war wounds, he turned to gardening, and owned a hardware store. His store was close to the rosarium of Empress Joséphine's rose hybridizer, André Dupont, in the rue du Four in Paris, from whom he became interested in breeding roses. In 1812 he sold his hardware store. Soon afterwards, in 1813, he purchased land in Chennevières-sur-Marne for a nursery, where he hybridized roses, fruit trees, and grape vines for raisins.

He married Adélaïde Charlotte Heu (? – 1816) in 1805, with whom he had three children: Aimée, Adélaïde and Théodore.

When the pioneering rose hybridizer Jacques-Louis Descemet (1761–1839) was forced to leave his nursery after invasion by the British following the Battle of Waterloo, Vibert absorbed Descemet's nursery stock, 10,000 rose seedlings, and hybridizing records. A month later, his 5-year-old daughter Adélaïde died; his wife Adélaïde died a few months afterwards.

Vibert was one of the founders of the Société d'Horticulture de Paris in 1827 (now National Horticultural Society of France). He moved his nursery to Saint-Denis in January of that year. He moved his nursery again in 1835, to Longjumeau, just south of Paris. And again, in 1839, he moved his nursery, this time to a more southerly climate in Angers.

In 1851 Jean-Pierre Vibert sold his nursery in Angers to his foreman, M. Robert, who in 1867 dedicated to him the cultivar 'Souvenir de Pierre Vibert'. Vibert retired to the Paris area, where he published articles about roses and grapes.

He died on January 27, 1866, age 88.

He created numerous cultivars, among which were 'Adèle Heu' named after his wife and 'Aimée Vibert' named after his daughter. He was particularly interested in spotted and striped roses. His hybrids span all the classes in existence at the time, from the once-blooming albas, gallicas and damasks, to the newly introduced chinas, teas and noisettes. He traveled throughout Europe to visit other rosarians, comparing cultivars and distributing new hybrids throughout Europe and to the US. His many articles on rose hybridizing and culture were also of great importance to the development of rose culture.

Some of his roses :

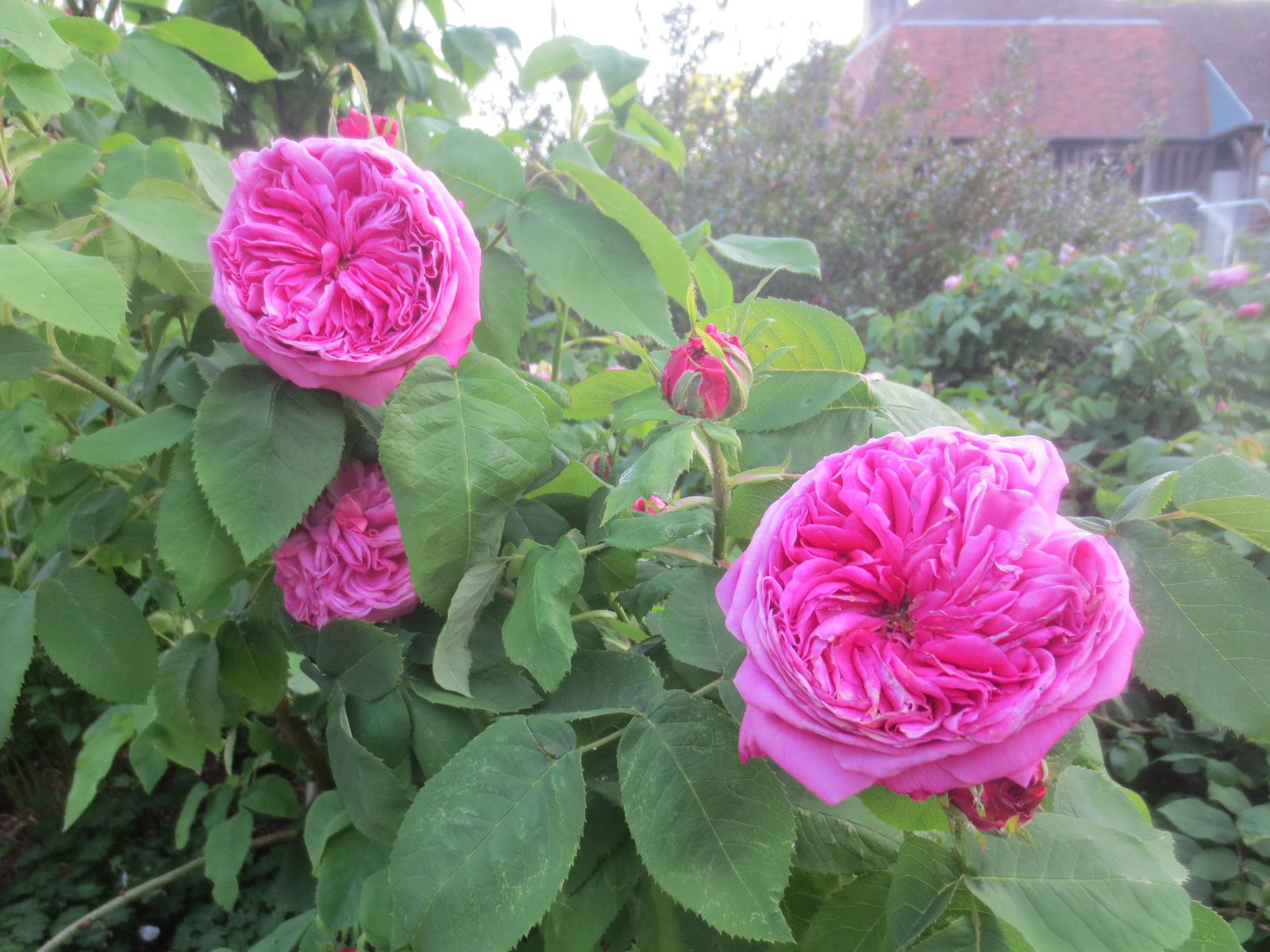
'Yolande d'Aragon' 1843, Portland rose.

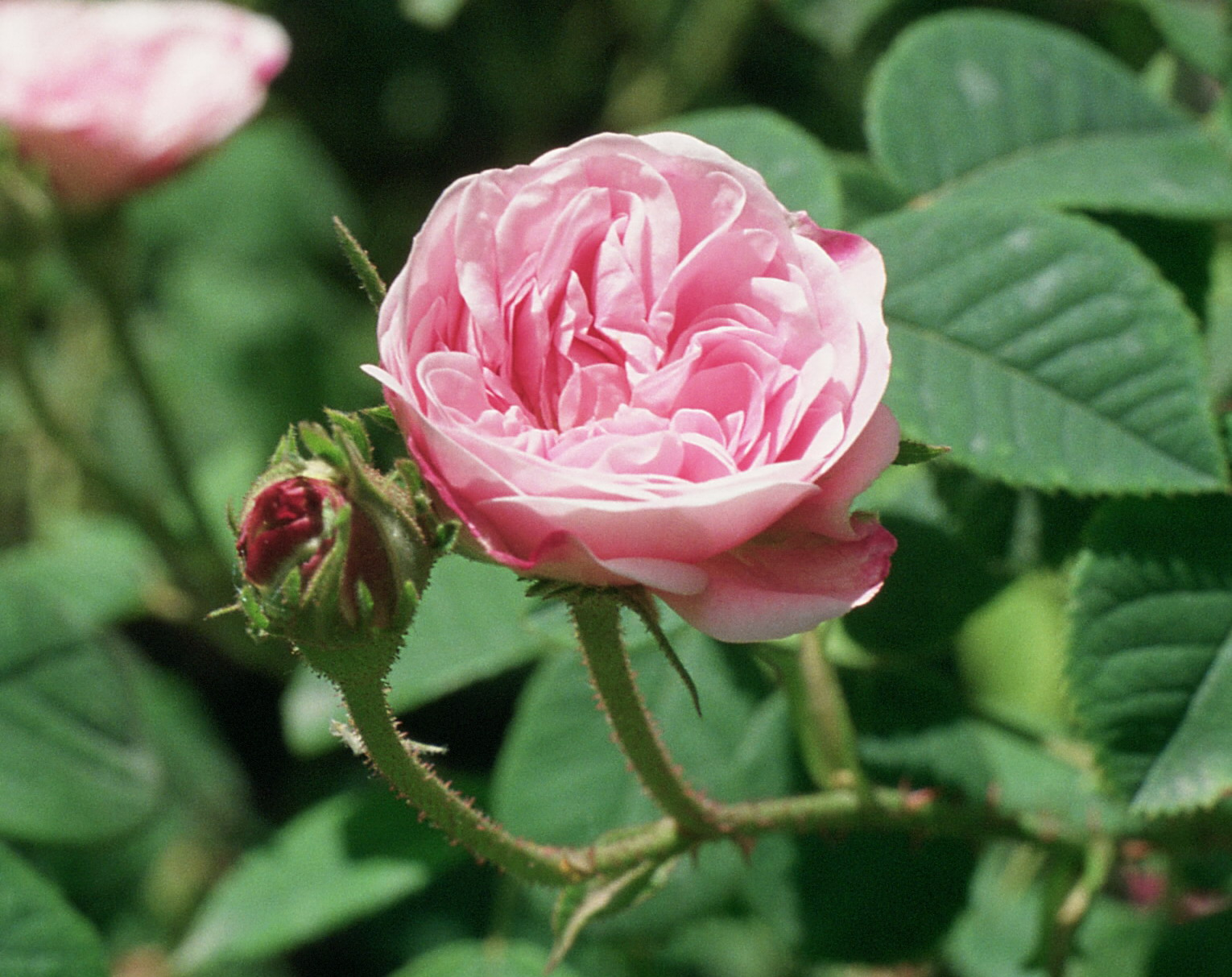
'Petite Lisette' 1817, Alba.

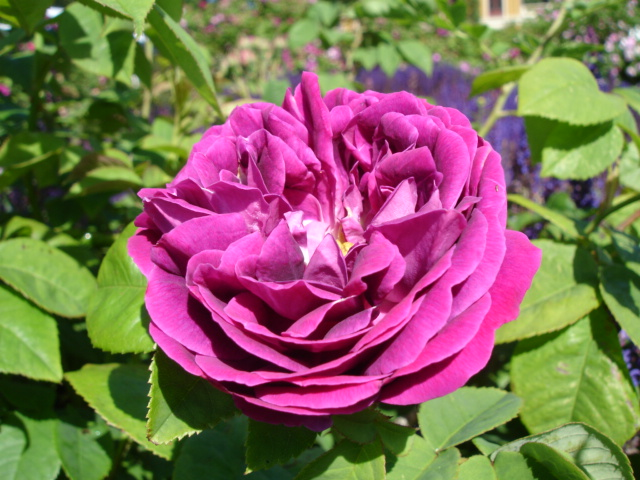
'Las Casas' 1828, Bourbon, Cl.

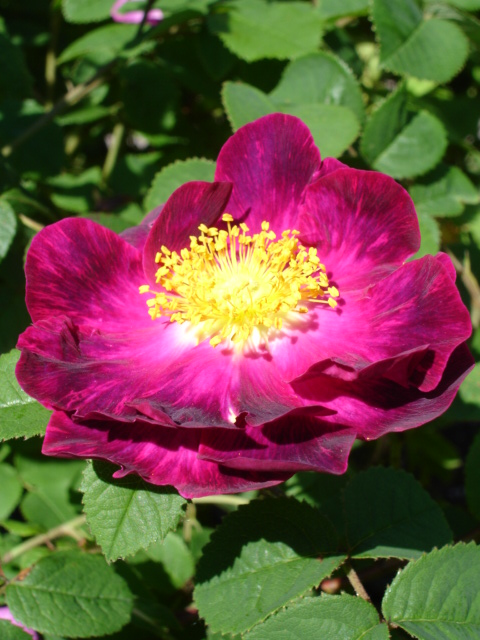
'Alain Blanchard' 1839, Gallica.

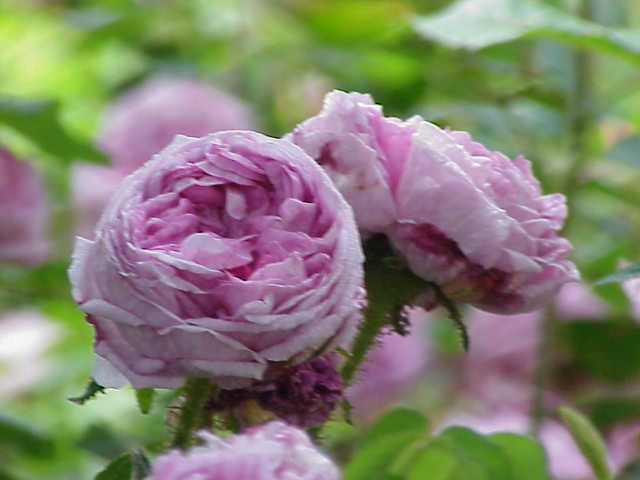
'Mousseux Ancien' 1825, Rosa moschata.

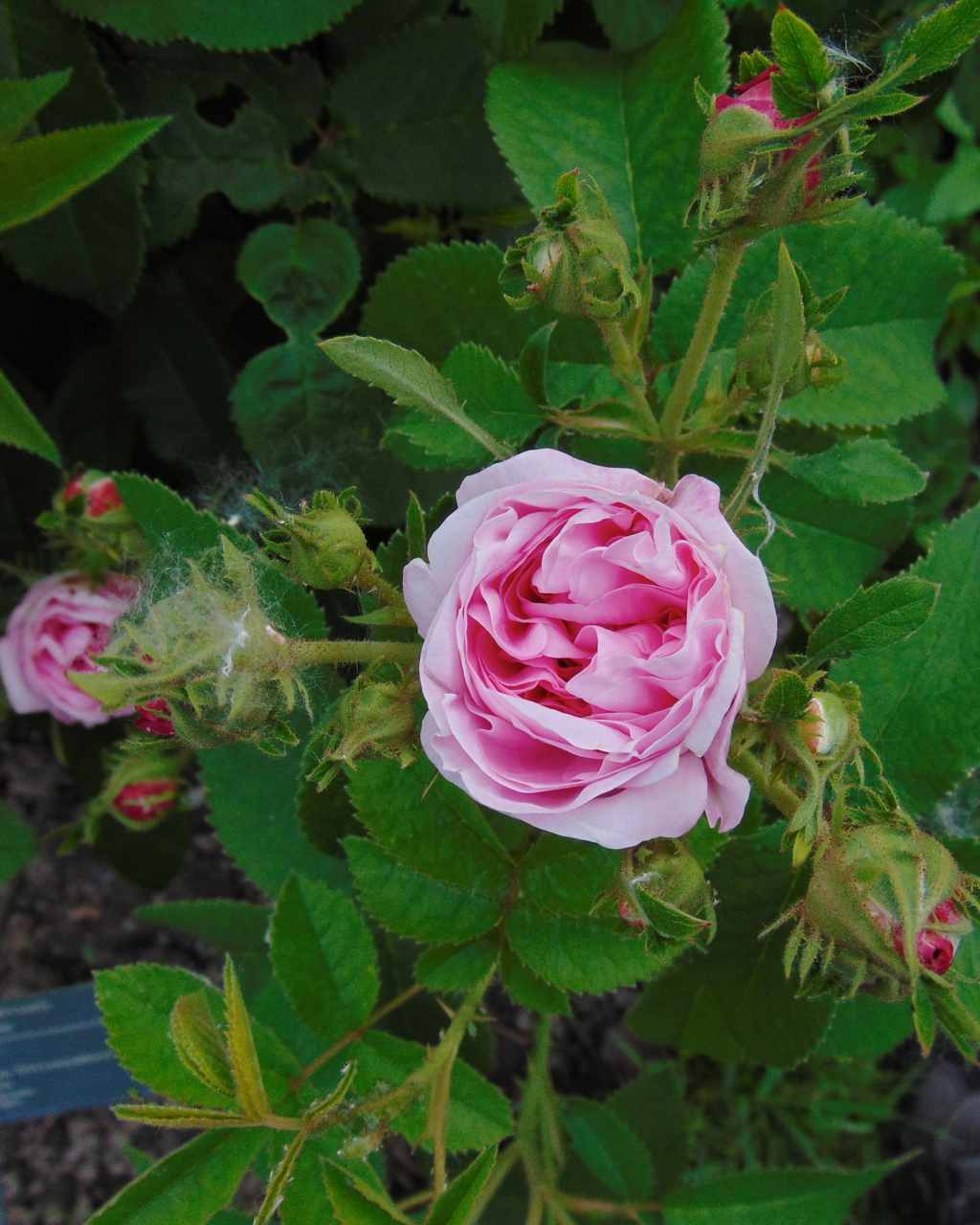
'La Ville de Bruxelles' 1837, Centifolia.

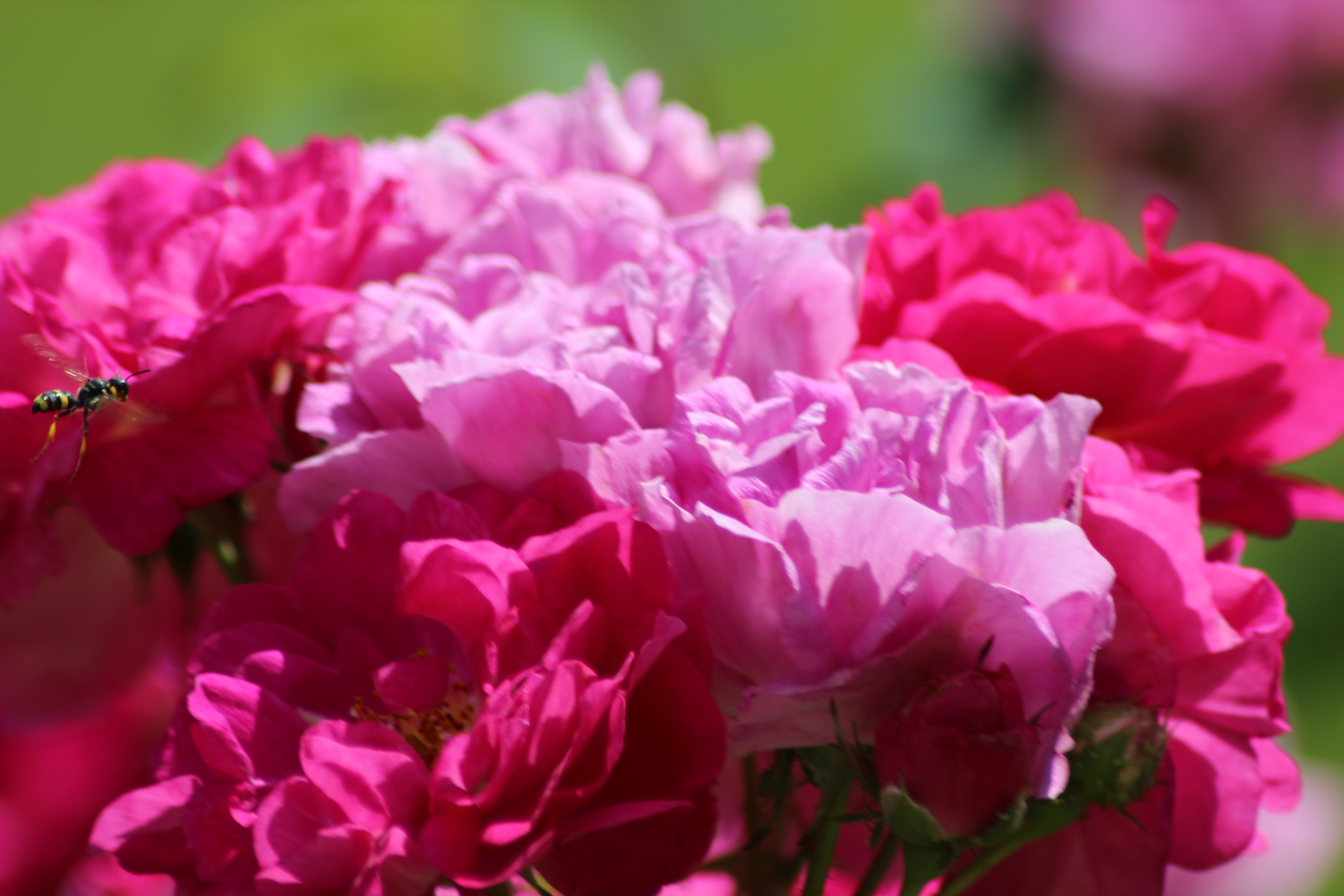
'De la Grifferaie' 1845, Multiflora.

== Cultivars created or introduced by Jean-Pierre Vibert ==
- Aimable Rouge (1811)
- Armide (1816)
- Adèle Heu (1816)
- Blanche de Belgique (1817)
- Petite Lisette (1817)
- Duchesse de Berry (1818)
- Diane de Poitiers (1818)
- Jeanne d'Arc (1818)
- Daphné (1819)
- Fanny Bias (1819)
- Minette (1819)
- Agathe Fatime (1820)
- Duc de Bordeaux (1820)
- Duchesse d`Angoulème (1821)
- Ipsilanté (1821)
- Joséphine de Beauharnais (1823)
- Amélia (1823)
- Ombrée Parfaite (1823)
- Mousseux Ancien (1825)
- Pourpre (1827)
- Aimée Vibert (1828)
- Camaieux (1830)
- Donna Marie (1830)
- Zoé (1830)
- Cramoisi Picoté (1832)
- Hortense de Beauharnais (1834)
- Blanchefleur (1835)
- Quatre Saisons (1836)
- Agar (1836)
- D'Aguesseau (1836)
- Invincible (1836)
- Anaïs Ségalas (1837)
- Alain Blanchard (1839)
- Panachée Double (1839)
- Oeillet Flamand (1840)
- Cosimo Ridolfi (1842)
- Yolande d'Aragon (1843)
- Comtesse du Murinais (1843)
- De la Grifferaie (1845)
- Ambroise Paré (1846)
- Turenne (1846)
- Blanc de Vibert (1847)
- Joasine Hanet (1847)
- Sidonie (1847)
- Pélisson (1848)
- Soeur Marthe (1848)
- Béranger (1849)
- Nathalie (1849)
- La Ville de Bruxelles (1849)
- Zaire (1849)
- Adèle Pavie (1850)

== Publications ==
- Observations sur la nomenclature et le classement des roses, suivies du catalogue de celles cultivées par J. P. Vibert á Chenevières-sur-Marne – Mme. Huzard, Imprimeur-Librairie, Paris 1832.
- Essai sur les roses. Des inconvénients de la greffe du rosier sur l´églantier et des modifications qu´elle nécessite – Mme. Huzard, Paris 1824–30.
- Observations sur la Rose "Triomphe de Valenciennes" – In: La Revue Horticole, 3e Serie, Vol. IV, 1850 Paris, pp. 42–45
- Des anomalies du rosier – In: Journal de la Société Impériale et Centrale d´Horticulture. Vol XI (1865), Paris 1865, pp. 343–50
- Catalogue des roses cultivées par J. P. Vibertà Saint Denis sur Seine – Mme. Huzard, Imprimeur-Librairie, Paris 1833.
