= Peter Lambert (rosarian) =

German rosario (1859–1939)

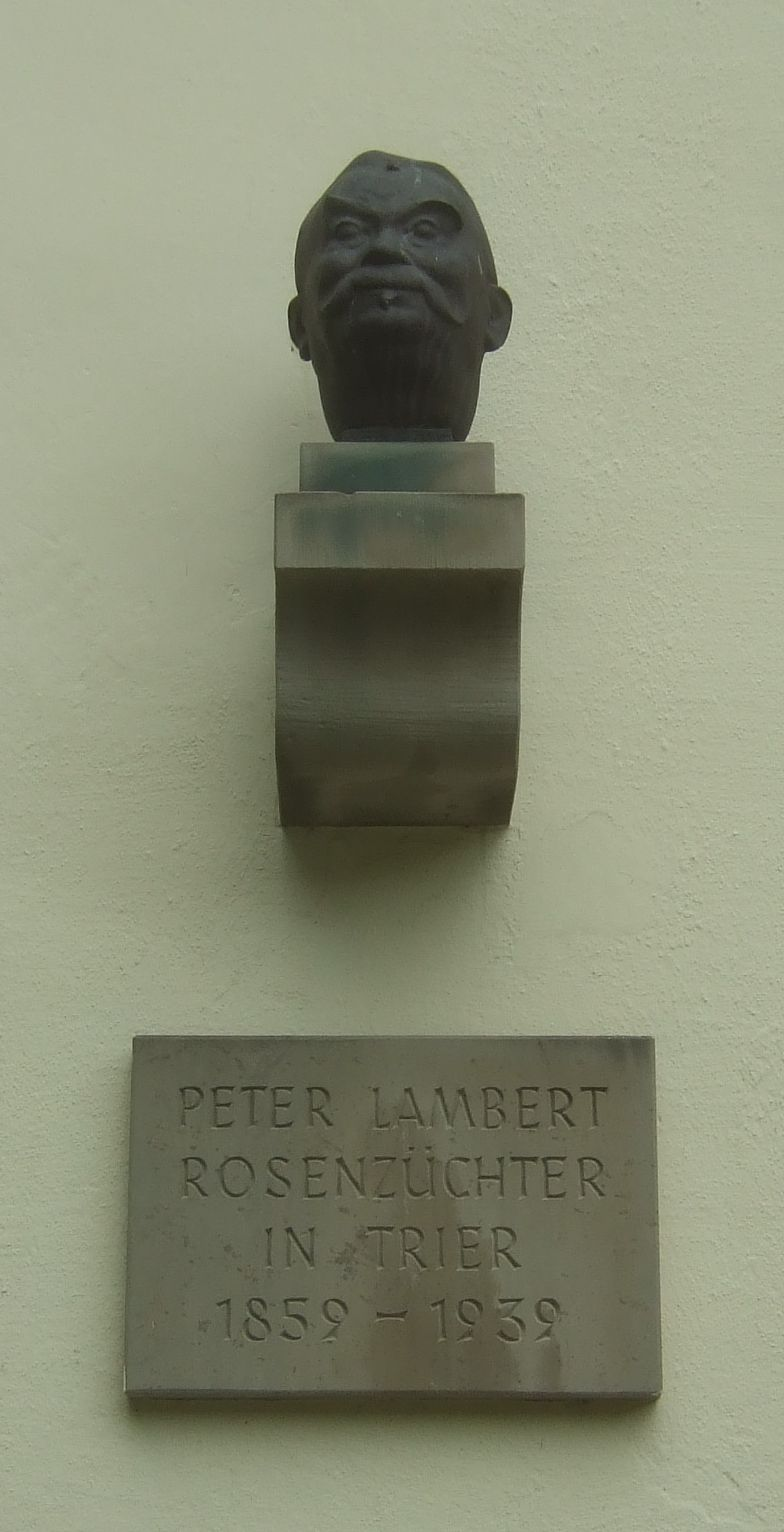
Bust of Peter Lambert in Nells Park, Trier

Peter Lambert (1 June 1859 – 28 February 1939) was a German rose breeder from Trier.

== Life ==
Peter Lambert was born on 1 June 1859 in Trier, Kingdom of Prussia. He acquired a knowledge of roses working with his father Nicholas Lambert in the Lambert & Reiter nursery, later Lambert & Söhne (Lambert & Sons). The brothers Johann and Nicholas had started the firm in 1869 with Jean Reiter, a nurseryman. Peter trained at a Prussian school of horticulture and gained experience working in nurseries in France and England. In 1891 he started his own nursery, eventually employing more than seventy workers.

In 1900 he married Léonie Lamesch, daughter of the Luxembourg rose breeder. To her he had dedicated one of his dwarf Polyanthas crossing Polyanthas with Noisettes. He maintained good contacts with Luxembourg nurseries (Soupert & Notting, Gemen-Bourg, and Ketten Frères), who distributed his varieties.

Peter Lambert helped establish the Europa-Rosarium at Sangerhausen in 1904 and the rosarium in Zweibrücken in 1914. He was also a founder of the Verein Deutscher Rosenfreunde (German Rose Society). He became its director and edited its Rosen-Zeitung 1890–1911. He was a jurist for rose competitions in Saint Petersburg, Paris, Haarlem, London, Lyon and Florence.

Lambert's catalogues in the years 1914-1931 are a valuable treasure trove of the most important roses of his time.

Lambert's rose dedications (over 100 by 1914) make a survey of contemporary German wartime and pre-war society. There are the usual rose people and their relations. Likewise aristocratic and military worthies, though the sabre rattles more loudly than usual: the rose 'Herero-Trotha' celebrates von Trotha's genocidal efforts in German Southwest Africa. Danzig is declared in 1935 to be 'Deutsches Danzig.' There is an "economic adviser," a "financial adviser" and a "confidential adviser," no doubt prominent public servants. Other names show Lambert's interest in poets ('Hoffmann von Fallersleben'), wine-growing areas and chess players.

He died on 28 February 1939.

"Lambert's garden in the walls of the old Benedictine abbey in Trier and his collection of roses … were all destroyed during World War II." After the war, a street in Trier was named after him and a rose garden in Nells Park planted in his honour.

== Rose breeding ==
From the late 1890s Lambert began to breed his own rose varieties, introducing the first ones in 1899. The Alsatian Schmitt's Three Graces – the roses 'Thalia', 'Euphrosyne' and 'Aglaïa'– were promoted by Lambert and provided material for many of his early crosses.

For fifty years Lambert bred original and much admired hybrid teas ('Kaiserin Auguste Viktoria', 'Frau Karl Druschki'), Chinas ('Unermüdliche'), Hybrid perpetuals ('Moselblümchen'), Rugosa crosses ('Schneezwerg'), Pernetianas ('Von Scharnhorst'), Bourbon–China crosses ('Adam Messerich') and Multiflora ramblers ('Mosel').

Lambert selected roses for good health by avoiding parents that displayed a weakness for mildew or rust. As a result, a century later his roses remain among the healthiest … In 1905, Lambert named the vigorous, free-flowering and remontant shrub 'Trier' in honour of his home town. He then used 'Trier' to develop a distinct class of large, repeat-flowering Hybrid Musk shrubs and climbers with wonderfully handsome leaves and a deliciously strong scent. These became known as the Lambertianas.

Lambert and his firm survived World War I but

the defeat and humiliation of World War I weighed heavily on him … and he found the 1920s a difficult time to earn a living. His natural curiosity faded, and he failed to keep pace with the innovations of younger rose breeders … he stuck increasingly to his own breeding lines and seldom took in new genes from other breeders' breakthroughs.

Not surprisingly his production of new varieties declined in the 1930s, his own seventies. But the very late 'Mozart' and 'Martha Lambert' are striking and original.

== Sortable list of Peter Lambert roses ==
Name	Date	Type	Colour	Photo
Moselblümchen	1889	Hybrid perpetual	Red	
Rheingold	1889	Tea	Orange and yellow	
Kaiserin Auguste Viktoria	1891	Hybrid tea	White	
Mosella	1895	Polyantha	Cream and yellow	
Thalia (by Schmitt)	1895	Rambler	White	
Euphrosyne (by Schmitt)	1896	Multiflora rambler	Pink	
Aglaïa (by Schmitt)	1895	Multiflora hybrid	Light yellow	
Frau Geheimrat von Boch	1897	Tea	Cream, pink edges	
Hélène	1897	Multiflora rambler	Lilac pink	
Oscar Kordel	1897	Hybrid perpetual	Carmine red	
Balduin	1898	Hybrid tea	Red	
Großherzogin Viktoria Melitta von Hessen	1898	Hybrid tea	white	
Herzogin Marie von Ratibor	1898	Tea	Yellow blend	
Reichsgraf von Kesselstatt	1898	Tea	Pink blend	
Eugenie Lamesch	1899	Polyantha	Yellow blend	
Goldquelle	1899	Tea	Yellow and red	
Hofgartendirektor Graebener	1899	Hybrid tea	Yellow blend	
Papa Lambert	1899	Hybrid tea	Medium pink	
Léonie Lamesch	1899	Polyantha	Copper	
Frau Syndica Roeloffs	1900	China	Deep yellow	
Schneewittchen	1901	Polyantha	Cream	
Katharina Zeimet	1901	Polyantha	White	
Tiergarten	1901	Multiflora hybrid	Deep yellow	
Frau Karl Druschki	1901	Hybrid tea	White	
Aschenbrödel	1902	Polyantha	Light pink	
Domkapitular Dr. Lager	1903	Hybrid tea	Salmon-pink	
Frau Lilla Rautenstrauch	1903	Hybrid tea	Orange-pink	
Freiherr von Marschall	1903	Tea	Carmine-red	
Gustav Grünerwald	1903	Hybrid tea	Pink	
Morgenrot	1903	Climber	Red	
Philippine Lambert	1903	Polyantha	Pink	
Schneekopf	1903	Polyantha	White	
Thalia Remontant	1903	Multiflora hybrid climber	White	
Abelle Weber-Paté	1904	Polyantha	White	
Adolphe van den Heede	1904	Hybrid tea	Cream	
Edu Meyer	1904	Hybrid tea	Yellow	
Frau Cecilie Walter	1904	Polyantha	Light yellow	
Hélène Videnz	1904	Multiflora hybrid	Salmon-pink	
Gruß an Zabern	1904	Multiflora hybrid	White blend	
Kleiner Alfred	1904	Polyantha	Yellow	
Oberhofgärtner A. Singer	1904	Hybrid perpetual	Carmine red	
Otto von Weddingen	1904			
Unermüdliche	1904	China	Pink blend	
Trier	1904	Multiflora hybrid	Cream	
Abendstern	1905	Multiflora hybrid	White blend	
Augenschein	1905	Multiflora hybrid	Yellow–white	
Direktor W. Cordes	1905	Hybrid tea	Yellow blend	
Graf Fritz von Hochberg	1905	Hybrid tea	Salmon-pink	
Hermann Raue	1905	Hybrid tea	Salmon-pink	
Herrin von Lieser	1905	Hybrid tea	Light yellow	
Lucien de Lemos	1905	Hybrid tea	Light pink	
Carmen	1906	Hybrid rugosa	Dark red	
Frau Ernst Borsig	1906	Hybrid tea	Carmine pink	
Herero-Trotha	1906	Tea	Yellow	
Lina Schmidt-Michel	1906	Hybrid tea	Pink	
Frau Alfred Mauthner	1907	Hybrid tea	Pink	
Avelsbach	1908	Multiflora hybrid	Red and yellow	
Frau Geheimrat Dr. Staub	1908	Climber	Dark red	
Frau Oberhofgärtner Singer	1908	Hybrid tea	Pink blend	
Frau Oberhofgärtner Luiger	1908	Hybrid tea	Pink and white	
Frau Philipp Siesmayer	1908	Hybrid tea	Orange-pink	
Großherzog Friedrich von Baden	1908	Hybrid tea	Pink blend	
Parkfeuer	1908	Hybrid foetida	Scarlet	
Philipp Paulig	1908	Hybrid perpetual	Dark red	
Rankende Miniature	1908	Polyantha	Light pink	
Rose Benary	1908	Hybrid tea	Pink and yellow	
Adrian Reverchon	1909	Multiflora hybrid	Carmine pink	
Alsterufer	1909	Hybrid tea	Crimson-carmine	
Backfisch	1909	Polyantha	Salmon-pink	
Bettelstudent	1909	Polyantha	Carmine-red	
Cineraria	1909	Polyantha	Red	
Excellenz Kuntze	1909	Multiflora hybrid	Light yellow	
Excellenz von Schubert	1909	Multiflora hybrid	Carmine pink	
Frau Alexander Weiß	1909	Polyantha	Pink	
Frau Oberhofgärtner Schulze	1909	Polyantha	Deep pink	
Frau Ottilie Lüntzel	1909	Polyantha	Cream	
Geheimrat Dr. Mittweg	1909	Polyantha	Pink blend	
Gustel Mayer	1909	Polyantha	Red	
Hildenbrandseck	1909	Rugosa hybrid	Carmine-red	
Kommerzienrat W. Rautenstrauch	1909	Hybrid foetida	Salmon-pink	
Lustige Witwe	1909	Polyantha	Carmine-red	
Mieze	1909	Polyantha	Orange-yellow	
Mme Léon Simon	1909	Hybrid tea	Deep pink	
Tip-Top	1909	Polyantha	Orange-yellow	
Trierisch Kind	1909	Polyantha	Pink-mauve	
Unser Peti	1909	Polyantha	Peach-pink	
Zigeunerknabe (by Geschwind)	1909	Bourbon hybrid	Violet and red	
Excellenz M. Schmidt-Metzler	1910	Hybrid tea	White blend	
Gartenstadt Liegnitz	1910	Polyantha	Purple-red	
Gräfin Stefanie Wedel	1910	Hybrid tea	White blend	
Freifrau Ida von Schubert	1911	Hybrid tea	Dark red	
Fürstin von Pless	1911	Rugosa hybrid	White	
Gräfin Marie Henriette Chotek	1911	Multiflora hybrid	Dark red	
Hauff	1911	Multiflora hybrid	Mauve blend	
Goethe (possibly by Geschwind)	1911	Moss	Scarlet	
Schneezwerg	1911	Hybrid rugosa	White	
Amalie de Greiff	1912	Hybrid tea	Coral-pink	
Heine	1912	Multiflora hybrid	White	
Luise Lilia	1912	Hybrid tea	Dark red	
Oriole	1912	Multiflora hybrid	Yellow	
Arndt	1913	Multiflora hybrid climber	Salmon-pink	
Baron Palm	1913	Hybrid tea	Red	
Frau von Brauer	1913	Wichurana hybrid	White	
Freifrau von der Goltz	1913	Hybrid tea	Salmon-pink	
Freifrau von Marschall	1913	Wichurana hybrid	Light pink	
Fritz Reuter	1913	Multiflora hybrid	Carmine-red	
Jona	1913	Hybrid tea	Red	
Mannheim	1913	Hybrid tea	unknown	
Ökonomierat Echtermayer	1913	Hybrid tea	Carmine pink	
Prinzessin Adolf zu Schaumburg-Lippe	1913	Hybrid tea	unknown	
Resi Bindseil	1913	Hybrid perpetual	Red	
Schiller	1913	Multiflora hybrid	Peach-pink	
Leonie Lambert	1913	Hybrid perpetual	Light pink	
Dr. Bender	1914	Tea	unknown	
H. F. Eilers	1914	Hybrid tea	Carmine-red	
Herzogin von Calabrien	1914	Hybrid tea	Cream	
Körner	1914	Multiflora hybrid	Orange-yellow	
Lessing	1914	Multiflora hybrid	Pink, white stripes	
Margarete Heike	1914	Polyantha	White	
Peter Rosegger	1914	Multiflora climber	Coral-pink	
Rückert	1914	Multiflora climber	Yellow	
Prinzessin Hildegard von Bayern	1914	Hybrid tea	Light yellow	
Detlev von Liliencron	1915	Hybrid foetida	Cream	
Emmy von Dippe	1915	Hybrid tea	Yellow-pink	
Generalin Isenbart	1915	Hybrid tea	Pink	
Generaloberst von Hindenburg	1915	Hybrid tea	Pink blend	
Graf Silva Tarouca	1915	Hybrid tea	Carmine-red	
Gruß an Zweibrücken	1915	Hybrid tea	Dark red	
Helene von Zwehl	1915	China	Coral-red	
Kaiser Franz Joseph	1915	Pernetiana	Orange–deep pink	
Kapitän von Müller	1915	Hybrid tea	Crimson	
Kronprinz Ruprecht	1915	Hybrid perpetual	Dark red	
Von Hardenberg	1915	Hybrid lutea	Cream	
Weddigen	1915	Hybrid tea	Light pink	
Generaloberst von Kluck	1916	Hybrid tea	Carmine-red	
Graf Fritz von Schwerin	1916	Hybrid tea	Pink	
Königin Maria Therese	1916	Hybrid tea	Carmine pink	
Kronprinz Wilhelm	1916	Hybrid tea	Pink blend	
Wieland	1916	Polyantha hybrid	Red	
Gellert	1917	Multiflora hybrid climber	White	
Hoffmann von Fallersleben	1917	Multiflora hybrid climber	Apricot blush	
Uhland	1917	Polyantha hybrid	Yellow-orange	
Hermann Robinow	1918	Pernetiana	Salmon-pink	
Justizrat Dr. Hessert	1918	Hybrid tea	Pink blend	
Dr. Helfferich	1919	Hybrid tea	Rose pink	
Dr. Ing. H. Blohm	1919	Hybrid perpetual	Dark red	
Heinrich Conrad Söth	1919	Multiflora hybrid	Deep pink	
Lisbeth Stellmacher	1919	Polyantha	Golden-=yellow	
Adam Messerich	1920	Bourbon	Rose pink	
Marie Henriette Gräfin Chotek	1920	Multiflora rambler	Crimson	
Mosel	1920	Multiflora rambler	Mauve	
Von Scharnhorst	1921	Pernetiana	Light yellow	
Bischof Dr. Korum	1922	Hybrid perpetual	Pink and yellow	
Chamisso	1922	Multiflora rambler	Light pink	
Frau H. Stakemann	1922	Hybrid tea	unknown	
Therese Zeimet-Lambert	1923	Hybrid tea	Carmine pink	
Gneisenau	1924	Multiflora hybrid	White blend	
St. Ingbert	1926	Hybrid perpetual	White	
Studienrat Schlenz	1926	Hybrid tea	Rose pink	
Druschki Rubra	1929	Hybrid perpetual	red	
Ausonius	1932	Multiflora hybrid	Light pink	
Grimm	1932	Multiflora hybrid climber	Light pink	
Heideröslein	1932	Multiflora hybrid climber	Salmon-pink	
Mosellied	1932	Multiflora hybrid	Purple-red	
Rudolf von Bennigsen	1932	Climber	rose-pink	
Goldene Druschki	1933	Hybrid perpetual	Golden-yellow	
Reichspräsident von Hindenburg	1931	Hybrid tea	Pink blend	
Gartendirektor Otto Linne	1934	Polyantha hybrid	Carmine pink	
Kletternde Hermann Robinow	1934	Pernetiana	Salmon-pink	
Deutsches Danzig	1935	Polyantha	Carmine pink	
Mozart	1937	Multiflora hybrid	Deep pink	
Aloysia Kaiser	1939	Climber	Yellow and red	
Martha Lambert	1939	Polyantha	Red	
