= George Schoener =

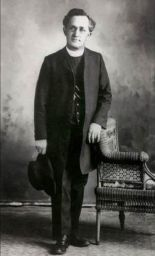
- Born: March 21, 1864; Steinach, Baden-Württemberg
- Died: October 2, 1941 (aged 77)
- Other name: Georg Schöner
- Education: Engelberg, Einsiedeln
- Known for: Rose breeding
- Scientific career
- Fields: Priest, botanist
- Institutions: Pittsburgh; Brooks, Oregon; Santa Barbara, California, Santa Clara University

George Schoener, or Georg Schöner (March 21, 1864 – October 2, 1941) was a German-born Roman Catholic priest who became known in the United States as the "Padre of the Roses" for his experiments in rose breeding, especially in the use of wild species. Only two of his creations survive today, however: 'Arrilaga' and 'Schoener's Nutkana'.

He was born into a peasant family of Steinach, Baden. He studied in Engelberg and Einsiedeln from 1883 to 1889. An aunt enabled him to emigrate to America, where he became a priest in Pittsburgh, Pennsylvania. Afflicted with illnesses, he ended up in Brooks, Oregon in 1911, where the rose growing activity in nearby Portland caught his interest. He searched the nearby hills for specimens of wild species such as Rosa nutkana.

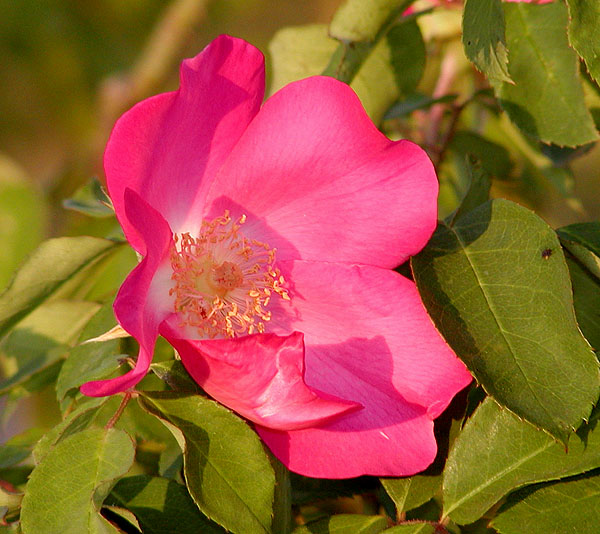
The rose cultivar 'Schoener's Nutkana', introduced in 1930

A fire in 1915 destroyed church and house, and in 1917 he moved to Santa Barbara, California.

In 1939 he took up a position at Santa Clara University in Santa Clara, California, but died just two years later.

The Georg-Schöner-Schule, a primary school in his hometown, Steinach, is named after him.

== See also ==
- List of Roman Catholic scientist-clerics
