= Roy Hennessey =

American horticulturalist (1897–1968)

Roy Hennessey (1897–1968) was a nurseryman specializing in roses. He operated a commercial rose nursery in Scappoose, Oregon and published articles and books on rose production and cultivation.

== Biography ==
Hennessey operated a commercial rose nursery from the 1930s to the 1960s. He published a column on rose cultivation in the Oregon Journal, starting on July 28, 1940. He participated in the American Rose Society's Proof of the Pudding program, in which professional rosarians evaluated new rose cultivars, from 1934 to 1941. He self-published Hennessey on Roses in 1942. He presented himself as self-taught in rose cultivation through many years experience growing tens of thousands of roses, for sale, in display gardens, and in test gardens. His last nursery catalog appeared in 1963.

One of the controversies surrounding Hennessey concerned his promotion of the dark red Australian rose 'Nigger Boy', hybridized by George Robert Knight of New South Wales. He planted this rose in his test gardens in 1941 and carried it in his catalog through 1962. In response to pressure to not sell this rose due to its offensive name, he took out a full-page ad in American Rose magazine in 1951, advertising his nursery as "The Home of Nigger Boy".

== Hennessey on Roses ==
Hennessey's advice on the growing of roses was often contrary to prevailing practices, and he was regarded as dogmatic and opinionated. Two of his mantras which were contrary to conventional wisdom, are to not prune roots when planting roses, and that roses are so tough that you could do anything to a rose bush short of leaving it lying on the ground, and it will grow and bloom. He also advocated for the reliance on beneficial insects rather than insecticides for pest control; for allowing roses to grow unpruned for a few years before beginning annual pruning; for selecting rose cultivars that will prosper in the particular climate they will be planted in; for not adding uncomposted organic matter in planting holes; for the installation of underground irrigation in rose gardens; and for providing some shade for roses in warm climates. He also credited anonymous Chinese gardeners with the creation of the double-flowered reblooming China and Tea roses introduced into European gardens and hybridizing programs, in contrast to the prevailing belief that these roses were discovered growing wild in China by European explorers. He ridiculed the belief that the Chinese could not possibly have created something that Europe didn't have, therefore these roses must be wild species.

His book Hennessey on Roses contains chapters on why rose colors and fragrances are so variable, the effects of climate and soil on rose behavior, training of pillar and climbing roses, rose pruning versus rose whacking, and treatment of cut flowers.

Hennessey focused his product line on roses he considered to be proven performers, rather than the newest introductions. He could be harshly critical of new introductions he considered to not be improvements on roses already on the market. His catalogs contained specific cultivation advice for many of his offerings.

== Hybrid roses ==
Hybrid roses by Roy Hennessey include:

- 'Artiste', a single yellow hybrid tea no longer commercially available.
- 'Flaming Ruby', a dark red floribunda which replaced the notorious 'Nigger Boy' in 1963; no longer commercially available.
- 'Florida Red', a red hybrid tea no longer commercially available.
- 'Heavenly Fragrance', a light pink hybrid tea no longer commercially available.
- 'Orange Smoke', an orange blend floribunda no longer commercially available.
