= Andrea Bottner =

American lawyer

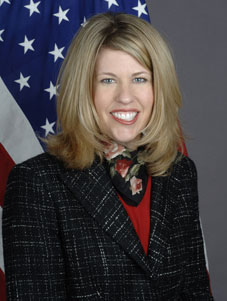

Andrea G. Bottner (born 1971 in Milwaukee) is an American lawyer, diplomat, Republican Party politician, political consultant and expert in women's issues, especially violence against women. She served as the politically appointed Director of the International Women's Issues Office of the United States Department of State in the George W. Bush administration from 2006 to 2009.

== Career ==
Bottner holds a BA degree in political science from the University of Delaware and a JD from the University of Baltimore School of Law. She was admitted to the Massachusetts Bar in 2000, and worked as an attorney representing battered women before serving as Deputy Chief of Staff to the Republican National Committee Co-Chairman Ann Wagner; Bottner was responsible for the national women's outreach strategy during the 2004 George W. Bush presidential campaign.

She served in the George W. Bush administration as Principal Deputy Director in the Office on Violence Against Women of the United States Department of Justice, as Acting Director of that office in 2006 and finally as Director of the International Women's Issues Office of the United States Department of State. As Director, she established the U.S. Secretary of State's International Women of Courage Award. After leaving the State Department, she founded Bottner Strategies, an advocacy firm.
