= Europa-Rosarium =

Rose garden in Sangerhausen, Germany

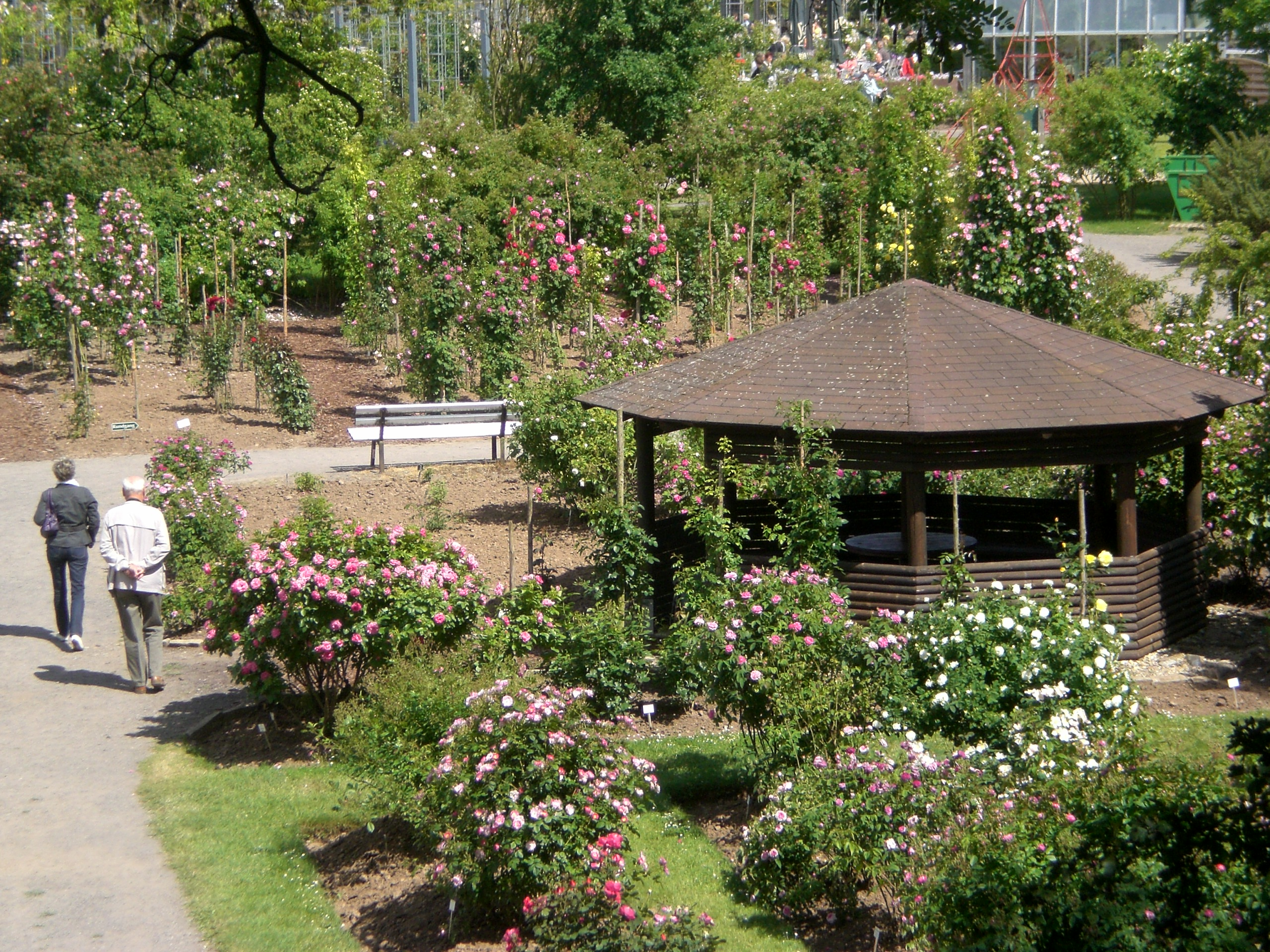
- Europa-Rosarium
- Interactive map of Europa-Rosarium
- Type: Rose garden
- Location: Steinberger Weg 3, Sangerhausen
- Coordinates: 51°28′31″N 11°18′53″E
- Area: 12.5 ha (30.89 acres)
- Created: 1899 / 1903
- Operator: Stadtverwaltung Sangerhausen
- Open: April - October
- Awards: Award of Garden Excellende (World Federation of Rose Societies)
- Plants: 8300
- Website: europa-rosarium.de/index.php?id=369

The Europa-Rosarium, formerly the Rosarium Sangerhausen, is a municipal rose garden located in Sangerhausen, Saxony-Anhalt, Germany. With some 8,600 species it is recognized as the largest rose collection in the world for both area and variety of roses, playing an important role as a budwood source and in research.

In 2003 it was granted the Award of Garden Excellence by the World Federation of Rose Societies.

It is open daily in the warmer months and charges an admission fee.

Today the garden contains about 80,000 rose bushes representing over 6,300 different rose cultivars, and describes itself as the most comprehensive rose collection in the world, with a Wild Rose collection containing more than 500 species of rare trees and shrubs. The focus of the rose garden lies in cultivars from the early 20th century, but the collection of rose species and of climbing and rambling cultivars are notable, too. About 2000 of the cultivars presented can only be found in Sangerhausen, even though the garden sends scions to rose collections around the world.

The garden also contains an arboretum of about 250 types of trees and shrubs.

== History ==
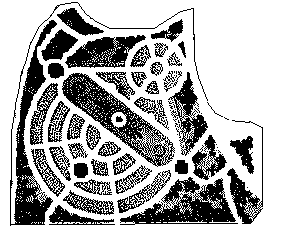
F.E. Doerr's garden plan

In 1897 Peter Lambert proposed the idea of a rose garden for the Verein Deutscher Rosenfreunde to collect newly introduced cultivars. Albert Hoffmann donated his rose collection of about 1100 different roses as a basis for the new rosarium. In 1899, the landscaping architect Friedrich Erich Doerr of Erfurt designed a formal rose garden, which was extended by an agricultural area in 1902.

The garden was opened to the public with an area of 1.5 hectare in 1903. In 1913 the Hermenbüste, a statue of Princess Augusta Viktoria of Schleswig-Holstein by Arnold Künne (1866–1942) of Berlin, was inaugurated, and Frau Auguste Vogel donated 7,000 Marks to expand the garden site to 12 hectares. In 1939 the garden was again expanded to its current extent, at which time it contain some 5,000 rose varieties. In 1993 it received its current name.

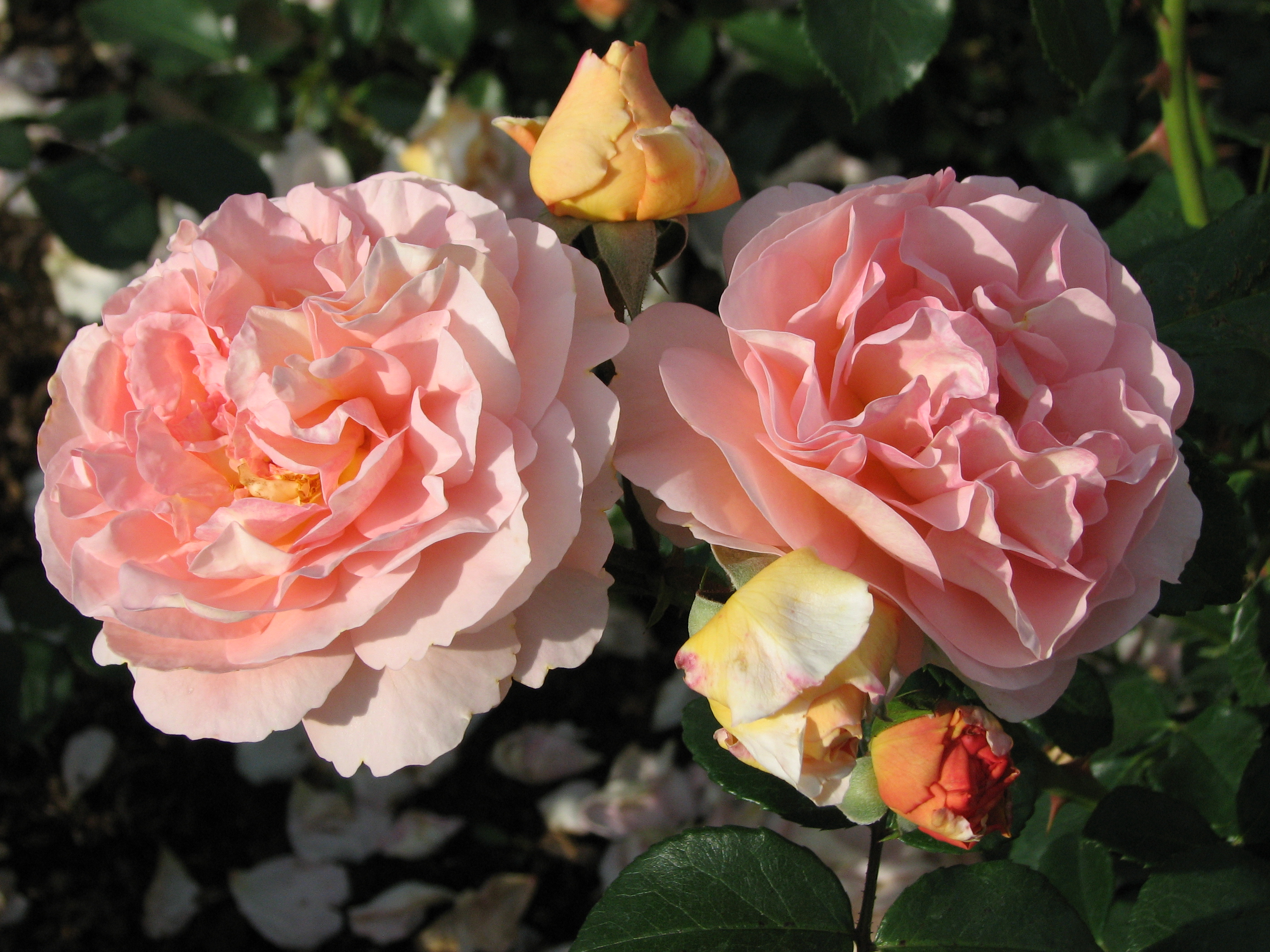
'Sangerhauser Jubiläumsrose', Kordes 2003

In 2003, on the occasion of its 100-year anniversary, a new main entry, a restaurant and three new gardens were added, called Jubilee Garden, Sea of Roses and ADR-Garden. The rose cultivar 'Sangerhauser Jubiläumsrose' (Kordes) is named by Minister-President of Saxony-Anhalt Prof. Dr. Böhmer in the Jubilee Garden. Further, the international commendation Award of Garden Excellence is granted by the World Federation of Rose Societies.

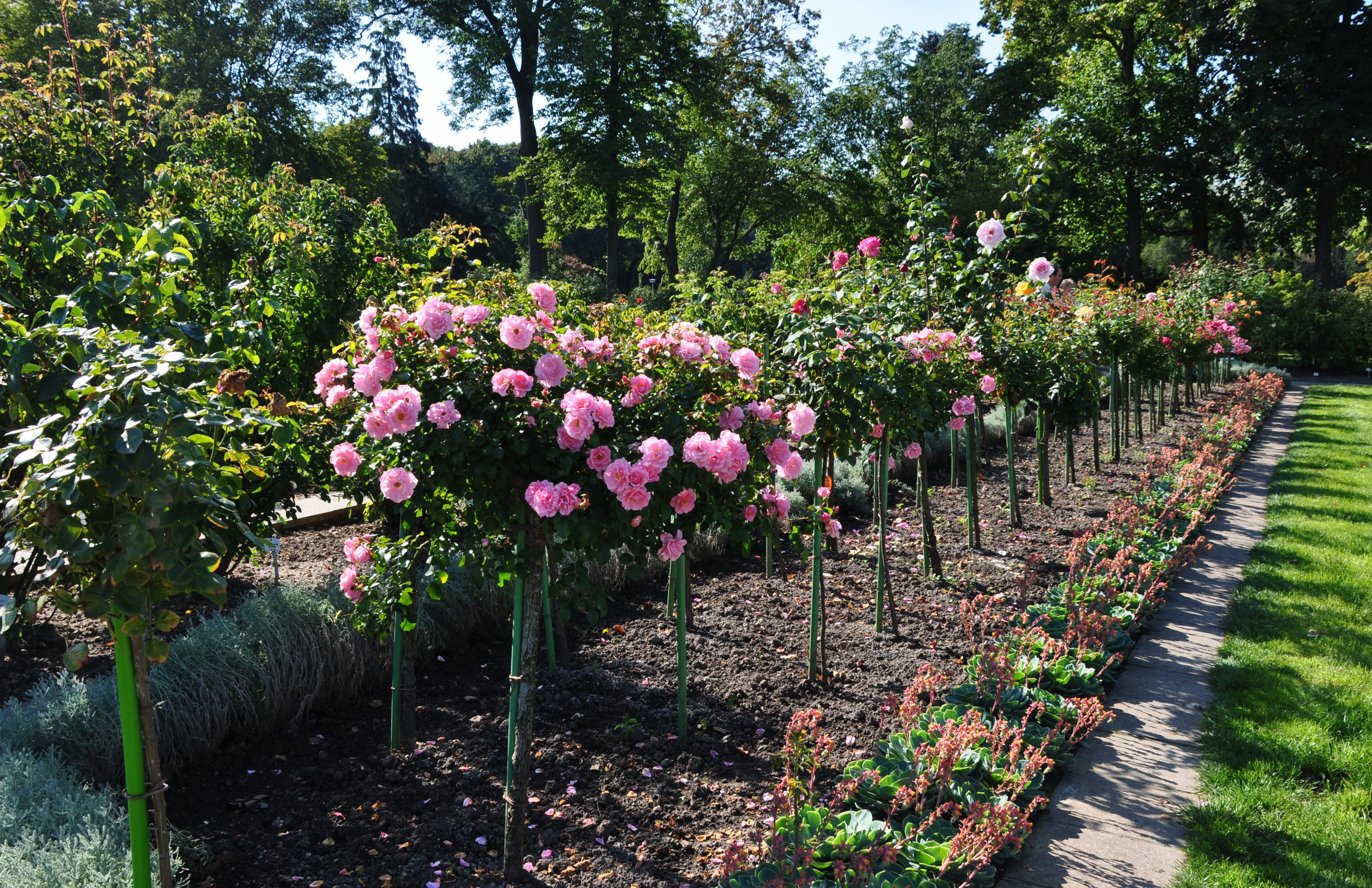
Rose trees

Since then, a Rose Information Center, a conservatory, and a fragrance garden were opened.

== Garden dreams ==
Europa-Rosarium Sangerhausen is part of the Saxony-Anhalt Garden Dreams project.

== See also ==
- List of botanical gardens in Germany

== Literature ==
- Charles & Brigid Quest-Ritson: Rosen: die große Enzyklopädie / The Royal Horticultural Society; Übersetzung durch Susanne Bonn; Redaktion: Agnes Pahler; Starnberg: Dorling Kindersley, 2004, Seite 354, ISBN 3-8310-0590-7
- Klaus-Jürgen Strobel: Alles über Rosen, Stuttgart: Ulmer, 2006, Seite 94, ISBN 3-8001-4471-9
