= Johannes Böttner =

German gardener

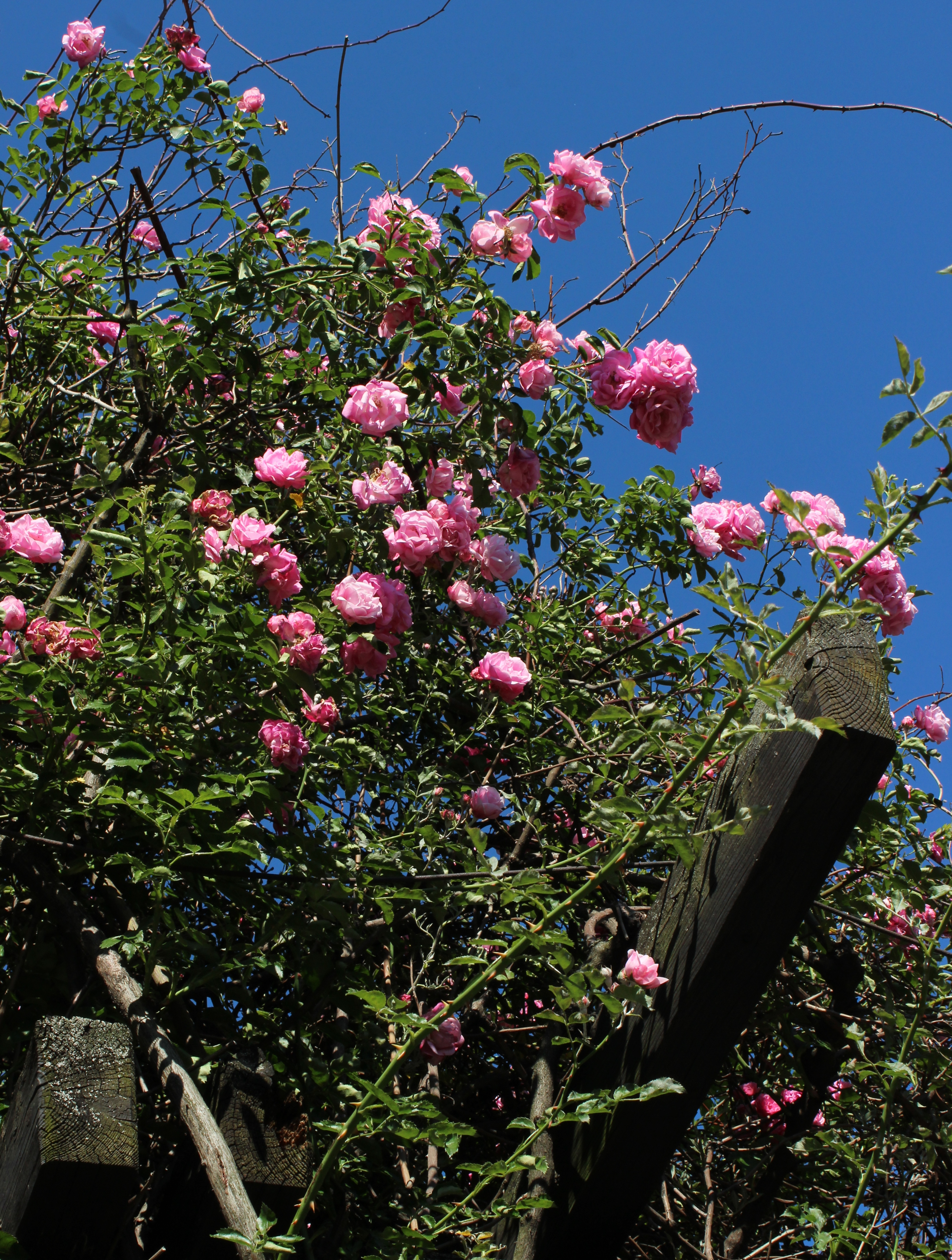
Rosa 'Fragezeichen', 1918

Johannes Böttner (September 3, 1861 – April 28, 1919) was a German horticulturist. He was born in Greußen, Germany and died in Frankfurt an der Oder. He created new cultivars of roses and vegetables: asparagus, strawberries and rhubarb.
