= Rosa 'Paul Transon' =

Rose cultivar

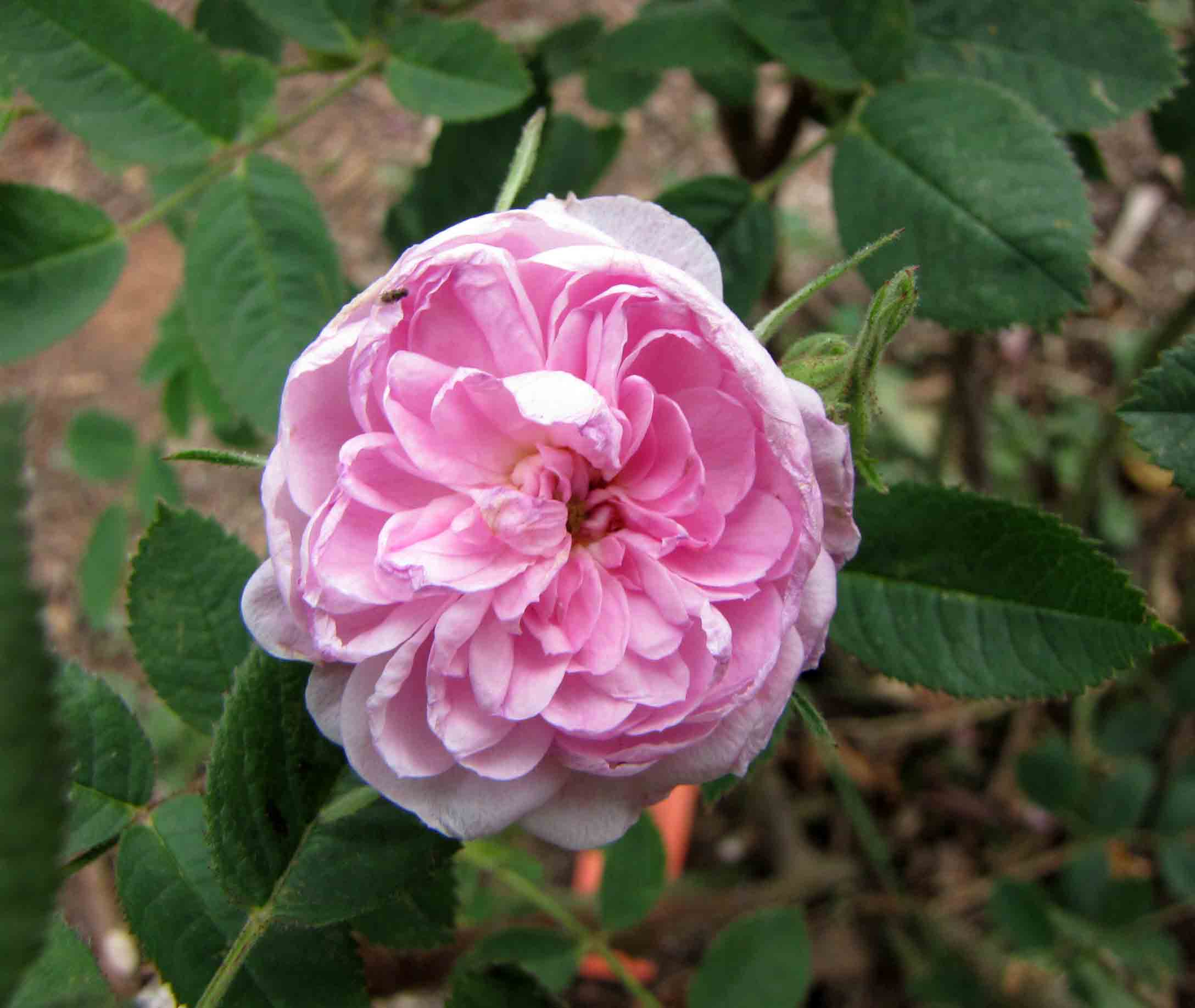
- Rosa 'Paul Transon'
- Genus: Rosa hybrid
- Hybrid parentage: Rosa lucieae x 'L'Ideal'
- Cultivar group: Hybrid wichurana
- Breeder: René Barbier
- Origin: France, 1900

Rosa 'Paul Transon' is a salmon-pink hybrid wichurana. The cultivar was bred by French rose hybridizer, René Barbier in 1900. The rose was awarded the Award of Garden Merit (AGM) by the Royal National Rose Society (RNRS) in 1993.

== Description ==
'Paul Transon' is a hybrid wichurana, a salmon-pink large-flowered rambling rose. The plant is 8' to 15' ft (243–365 cm) in height, with a 6' to 8' ft (183–243 cm) spread. The rose has large, very full petals, that have a flat bloom form. It typically blooms in clusters once a year with a later scattered bloom. 'Paul Transon' has dark pink buds that open to salmon pink flowers, with a copper pink center. Blooms pale to a light pink as they age. Flowers are borne singly and in clusters of up to five. The rose has a mild apple, tea fragrance. The rose blooms continuously through the summer season into fall, but it is not a mass producer of flowers. The rose makes an excellent cut flower. The foliage is dark green and glossy.

== History ==
=== Barbier Frères & Compagnie ===
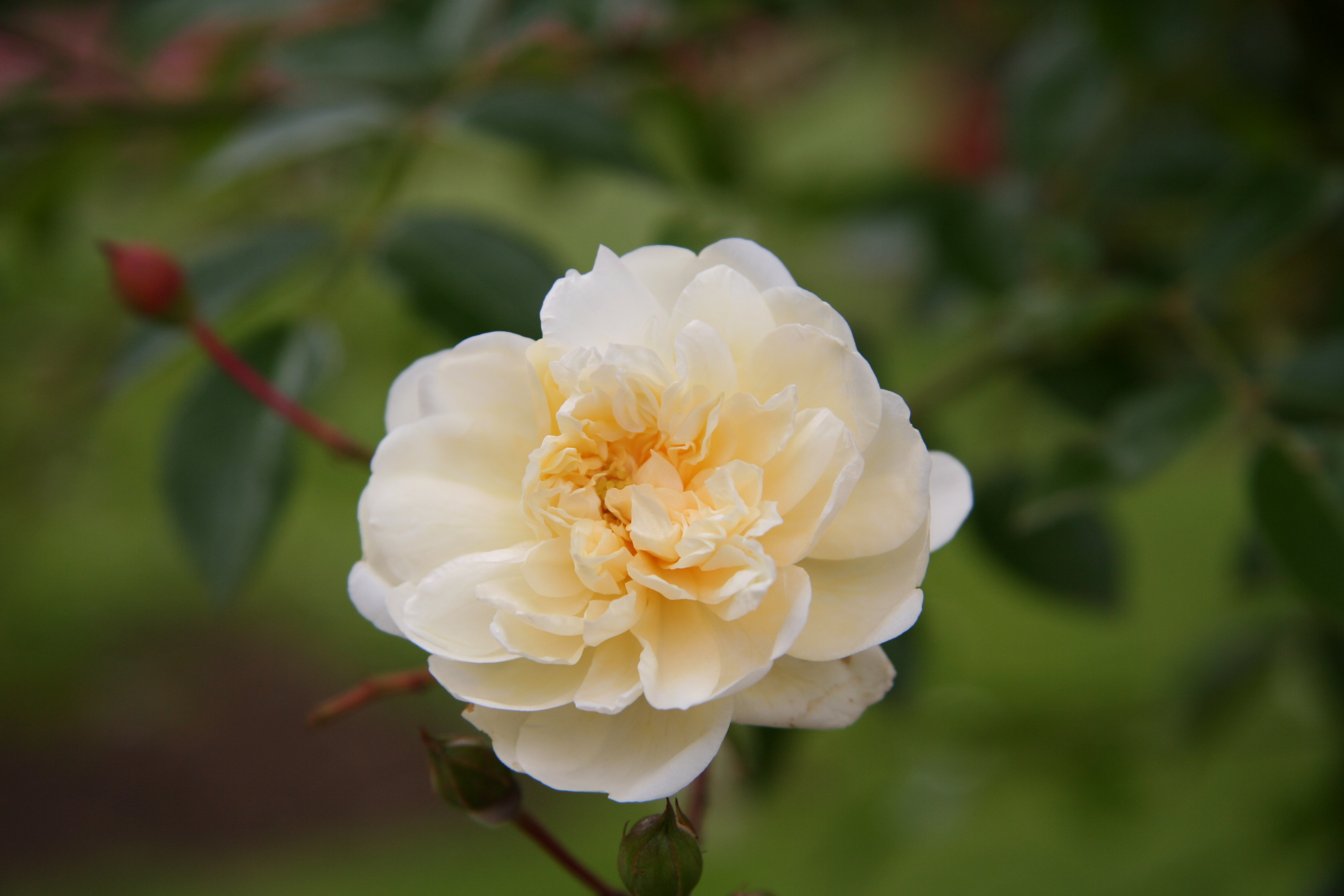
'Alberic Barbier', 1900

The Barbier nursery was founded by Albert Barbier (1845 -1931) and his brother, Eugène, in Olivet, a village near Orleans, France. Albert was a nurseryman. He initially worked at the Transon brothers nursery and the D. Dauvesse nursery in Orleans with fellow nurseryman, Paul Transon, as his partner. Barbier took over the management of Transon nurseries in 1872, before starting his own nursery with his brother Eugène in 1894. The Barbier family business initially sold fruit trees, but later began breeding and selling roses. Albert's sons, René (1870-1931), Léon (b 1878), and Georges later joined the company.

The Barbiers introduced the hybrid Wichurana rose to Europe in the early 1900s. Between 1900 and 1930, René Barbier produced exceptional new rose cultivars, large-flowered rambling roses with strongly scented and beautifully shaped flowers. Barbier developed this new rose variety by crossing Rosa 'lucieae', (a vigorous, trailing species from Japan known for its thick purplish-red canes and glossy, dark green, foliage), and hybrid tea roses.

During the height of rose production, the Barbier nursery produced some of the most popular and best selling roses at the time, including 'Albertine', 'Alexandre Girault', and 'Francois Juranville'. The Barbiers roses produced more flowers but were less hardy than ramblers produced from Hybrid Perpetual stock parents. Later ramblers produced by the nursery were more robust. Hardier ramblers like 'Primevère' (1929) and 'Jacotte' (1920) were popular in colder climates, like the New England region of the United States.

The Barbier nursery also introduced the first Wichurana Polyantha rose, 'Renoncule' in 1911. After eighty years in business, The Barbier nursery closed in 1972. There are 33 Barbier rose cultivars that exist today, all introduced between 1900 and 1930. A large collection of Barbier roses grow in the Roseraie du Val-de-Marne gardens near Paris, France.

=== 'Paul Transon' ===
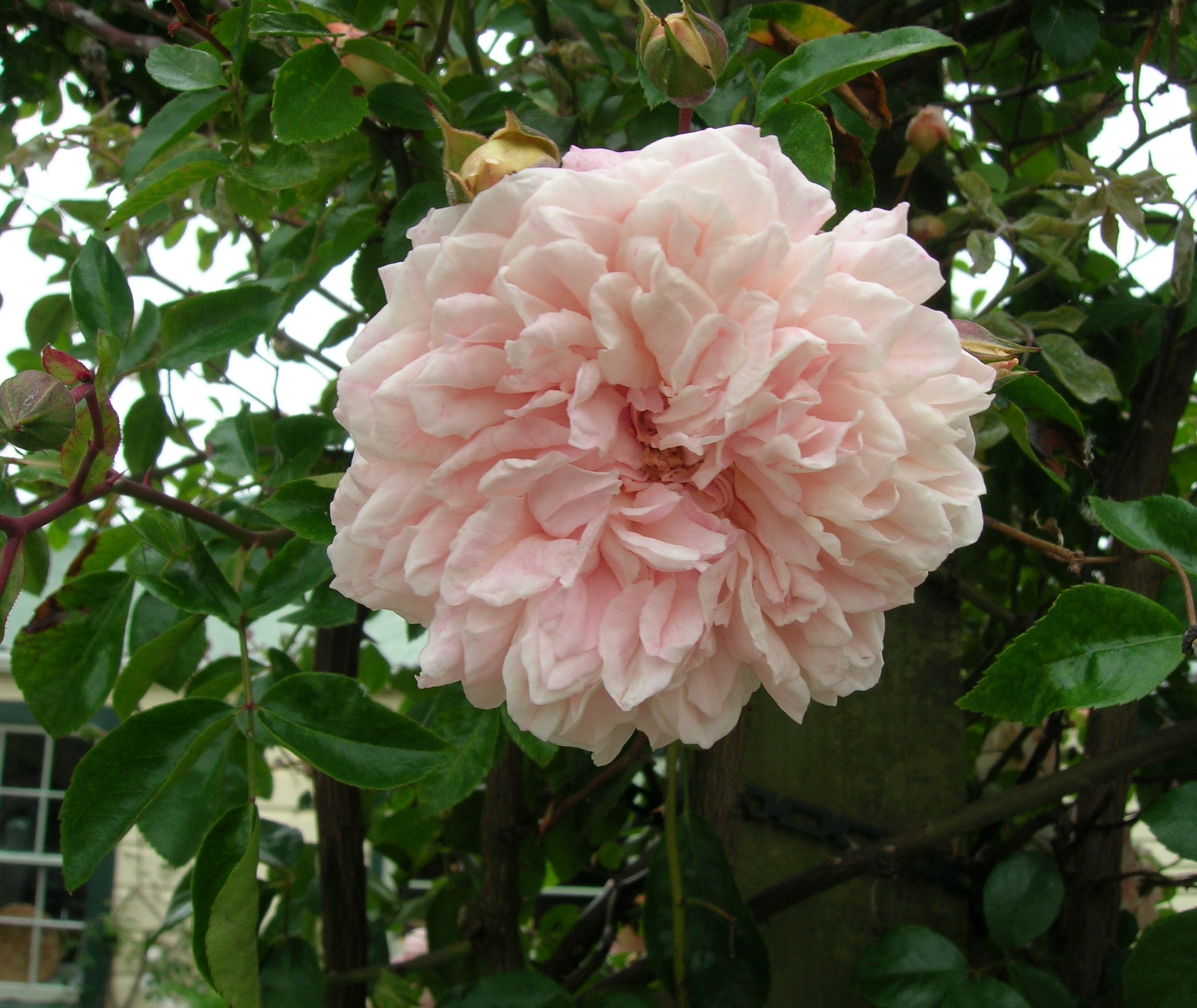
'Paul Transon'

The rose was bred by René Barbier in 1900 by crossing Rosa lucieae and light pink hybrid tea rose, 'L'Ideal'. There are no child plants. It was introduced in Australia by Arthur Yates & Co. Ltd. in 1905 as 'Paul Transon'.

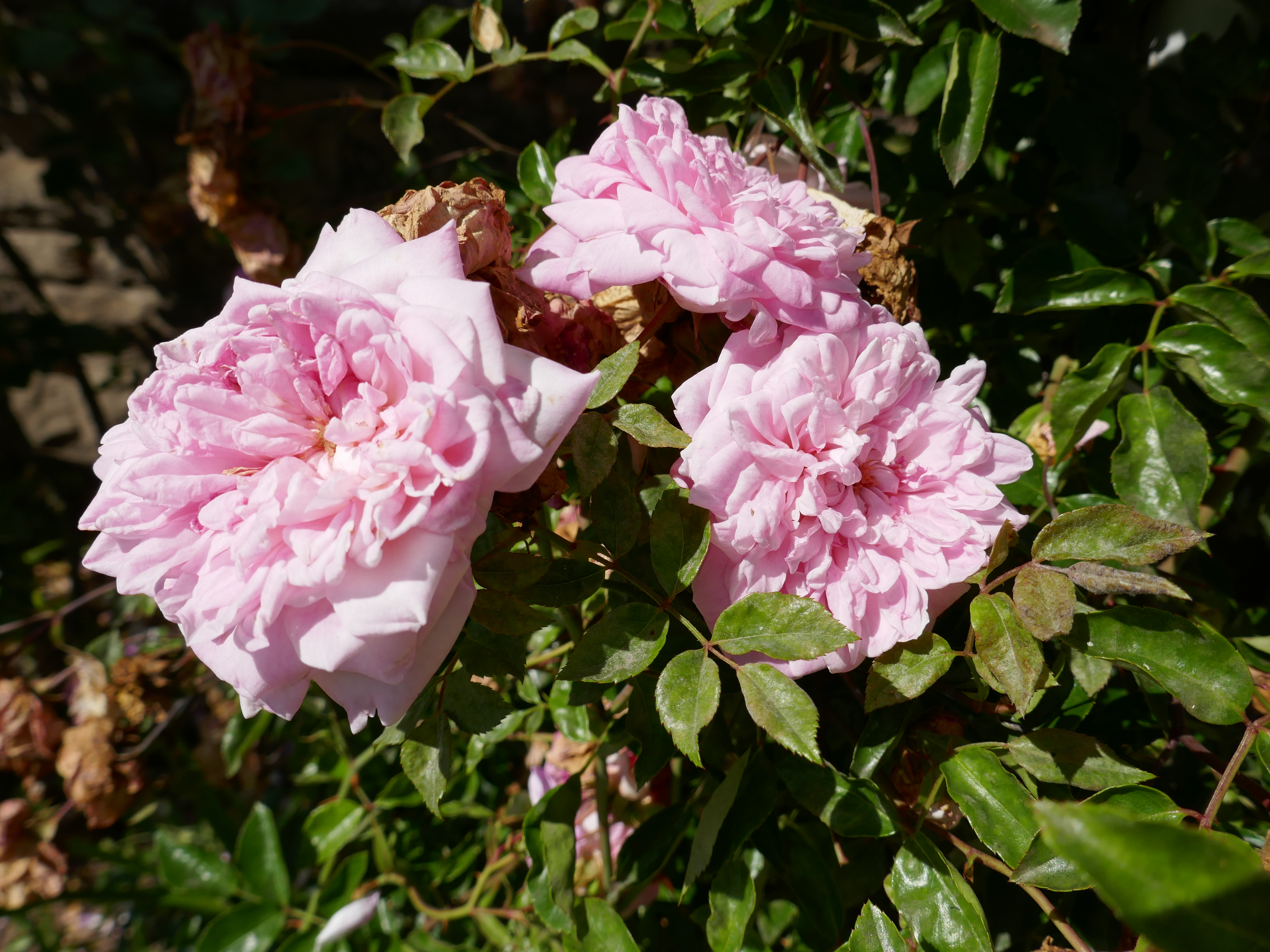
'Paul Noël'

There has been some confusion in the horticultural community between 'Paul Transon' and 'Paul Noël'. The majority of 'Paul Transon' roses sold in Europe are actually 'Paul Noël'. "'Paul Transon' has cupped flowers and incurved petals, whereas 'Paul Noël' has a starburst of quilled petals radiating out from the centre."

The rose has been awarded the Award of Garden Merit (AGM) by the Royal National Rose Society (RNRS) in 1993.
