= Rosa 'Alexandre Girault' =

Rose cultivar

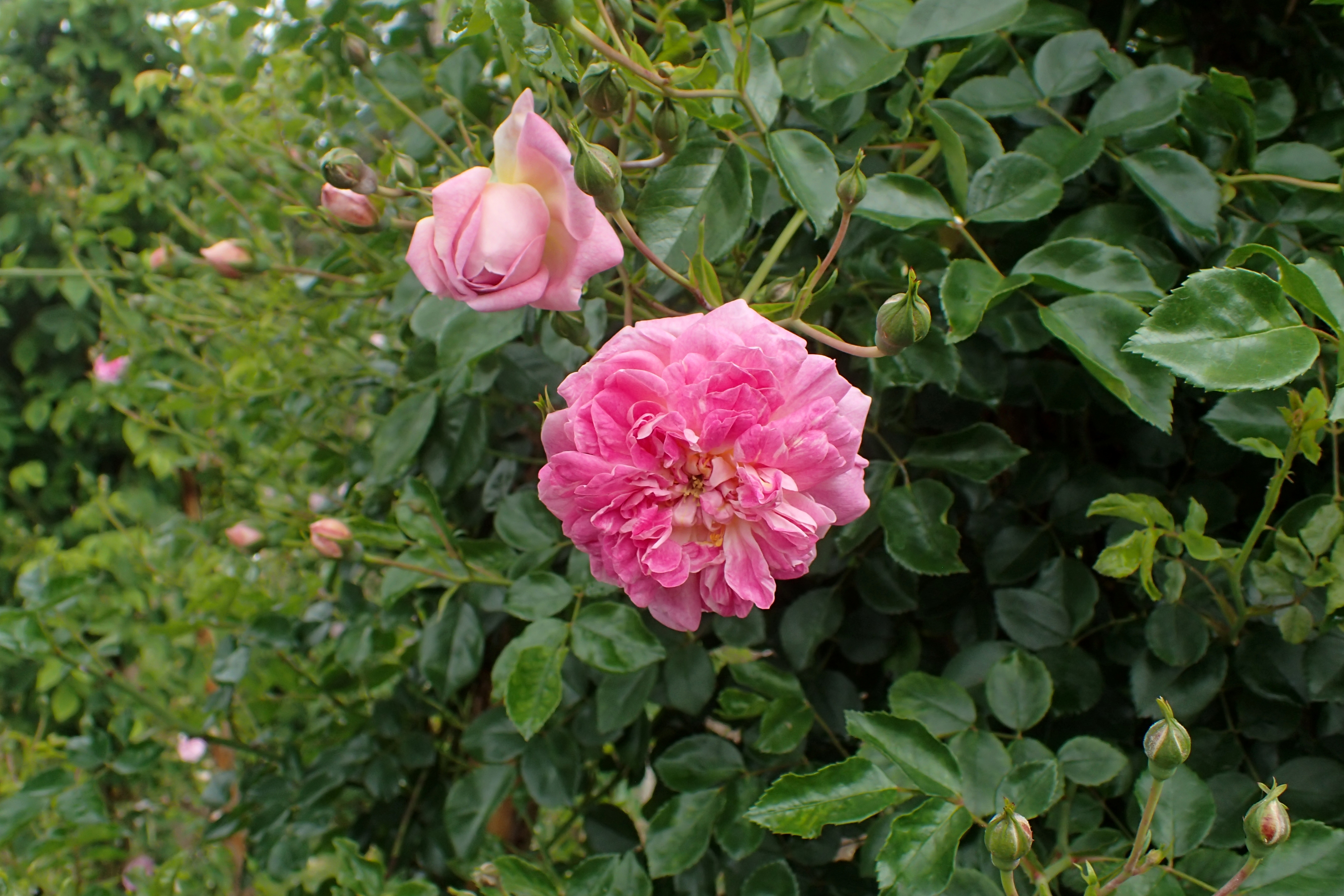
- Rosa 'Alexandre Girault'
- Genus: Rosa hybrid
- Hybrid parentage: Rosa lucieae x 'Papa Gontier'
- Cultivar group: Hybrid wichurana
- Marketing names: 'Alexander Girault', 'Alexandre Girault'
- Breeder: René Barbier, before 1921
- Origin: France, 1909

Rosa 'Alexandre Girault' is a deep cherry pink hybrid wichurana, a large-flowered climbing rose. The cultivar was bred by René Barbier in 1907. The rose was awarded the Award of Garden Merit (AGM) by the Royal National Rose Society (RNRS) in 2012.

== Description ==
'Alexandre Girault' is a hybrid wichurana rose, a robust climber, 12' to 26 ft (365–790 cm) in height, with a 12 ft (365 cm) spread. The rose has large, very full petals, that have a flat bloom form. It typically blooms in clusters once a year with a later scattered bloom. 'Alexandre Girault' has a strong, fruity fragrance. The flowers are a deep pink with yellow tints at the center and white petal backs. The flowers hang down in loose clusters of typically five to nine petals, opening up to a mass of pointed petals. The foliage is small and dark green. It is a very vigorous grower, often reaching up to 26 ft (8) if supported. The plant has long, slender flexible stems. The rose makes an excellent cut flower. The foliage is dark green and glossy

== History ==
=== Barbier Frères & Compagnie ===
The Barbier nursery was founded by Albert Barbier (1845-1931) and his brother, Eugène, in Olivet, a village near Orleans, France. Albert was a nurseryman. He initially worked at the Transon brothers nursery and the D. Dauvesse nursery in Orleans with fellow nurseryman, Paul Transon, as his partner. Barbier took over the management of Transon nurseries in 1872, before starting his own nursery with his brother Eugène in 1894. The Barbier family business initially sold fruit trees, but later began breeding and selling roses. Albert's sons, René (1870-1931), Léon (b 1878), and Georges later joined the company. The Barbiers introduced the hybrid Wichurana rose to Europe in the early 1900s. Between 1900 and 1930, René Barbier produced exceptional new rose cultivars, large-flowered rambling roses with strongly scented and beautifully shaped flowers. Barbier developed this new rose variety by crossing Rosa 'lucieae', (a vigorous, trailing species from Japan known for its thick purplish-red canes and glossy, dark green, foliage), and hybrid tea roses.

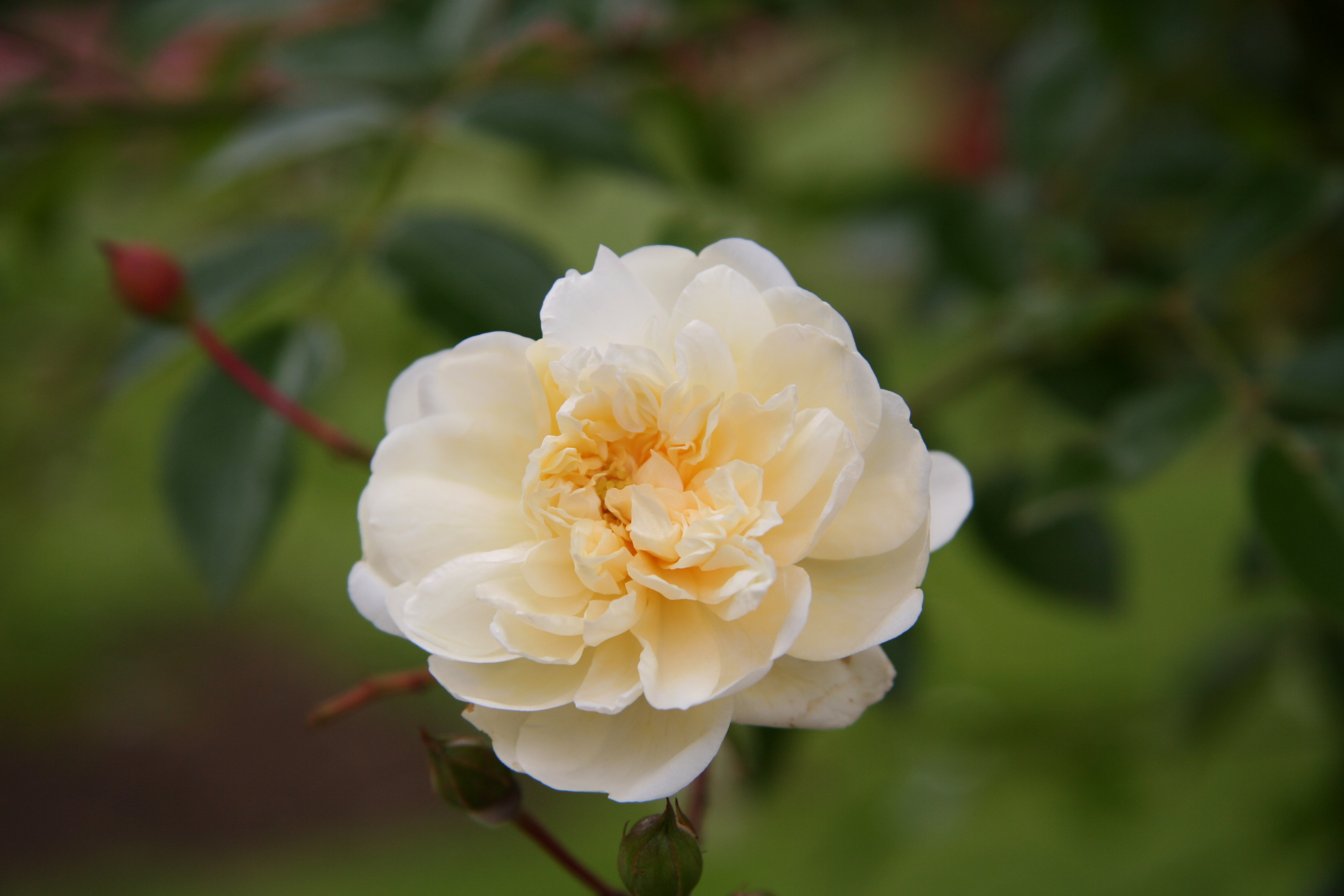
'Albéric Barbier', 1900

During the height of rose production, the Barbier nursery produced some of the most popular and best selling roses at the time, including 'Albertine', 'Alexandre Girault', and 'François Juranville'. The Barbiers roses produced more flowers but were less hardy than ramblers produced from Hybrid Perpetual stock parents. Later ramblers produced by the nursery were more robust. Hardier ramblers like 'Primevère' (1929) and 'Jacotte' (1920) were popular in colder climates, like the New England region of the United States.

The Barbier nursery also introduced the first Wichurana Polyantha rose, 'Renoncule' in 1911. After eighty years in business, The Barbier nursery closed in 1972. There are 33 Barbier rose cultivars that exist today, all introduced between 1900 and 1930. A large collection of Barbier roses grow in the Roseraie du Val-de-Marne gardens near Paris, France.

=== 'Alexandre Girault' ===
The rose was bred by René Barbier in 1909 by crossing Rosa lucieae and hybrid tea rose, 'Papa Gontier'. The new rose cultivar established the reputation of the Barbier nursery throughout Europe. There is a famous planting of 'Alexandre Girault that envelopes the garden trellis at L'Haÿ-les-Roses in Paris and bursts into a mass of soft pink roses every May. The rose has been awarded the Award of Garden Merit (AGM) by the Royal National Rose Society (RNRS) in 2012.
