= Rosa 'Auguste Gervais' =

Rose cultivar

- Genus: Rosa hybrid
- Hybrid parentage: Rosa lucieae × 'Le Progrès'
- Cultivar group: Hybrid wichurana
- Marketing names: 'Auguste Gervais', 'Auguste Gervaise'
- Breeder: René Barbier
- Origin: France, 1916

Rosa 'Auguste Gervais is a pale apricot-pink hybrid wichurana, a large-flowered rambling rose that is very popular in France where it was first introduced. The cultivar was bred by French rose breeder, René Barbier in 1916. The rose was awarded the Bagatelle (Paris) Certificat de Mérite in 1919.

== Description ==
'Auguste Gervais' is a hybrid wichurana rose, a robust climber, 12' to 25 ft (365–762 cm) in height, with a 18 ft (550 cm) spread. The flowers are large, semi-double with a hybrid tea-like bloom form. 'Auguste Gervais' has a strong fragrance. The flower color is apricot-pink with copper undertones and fades to cream. Flowers are borne in clusters of 5 to 12 and the first flowering is abundant, but will bloom sporadically until autumn. The foliage is dark green and glossy. The plant has long, slender, flexible stems.

== History ==
=== Barbier Frères & Compagnie ===
The Barbier nursery was founded by Albert Barbier (1845-1931) and his brother, Eugène, in Olivet, a village near Orleans, France. Albert was a nurseryman who initially worked at the Transon brothers nursery and the D. Dauvesse nursery in Orleans with fellow nurseryman, Paul Transon, as his partner. Barbier took over the management of Transon nurseries in 1872, before starting his own nursery with his brother Eugène in 1894. The Barbier family business initially sold fruit trees, but later began breeding and selling roses. Albert's sons, René (1870-1931), Léon (b 1878), and Georges later joined the company.

The Barbiers introduced the hybrid Wichurana rose to Europe in the early 1900s. Between 1900 and 1930, René Barbier produced exceptional new rose cultivars, large-flowered rambling roses with strongly scented and beautifully shaped flowers. Barbier developed this new rose variety by crossing Rosa 'lucieae', (a vigorous, trailing species from Japan known for its thick purplish-red canes and glossy, dark green, foliage), and hybrid tea roses.

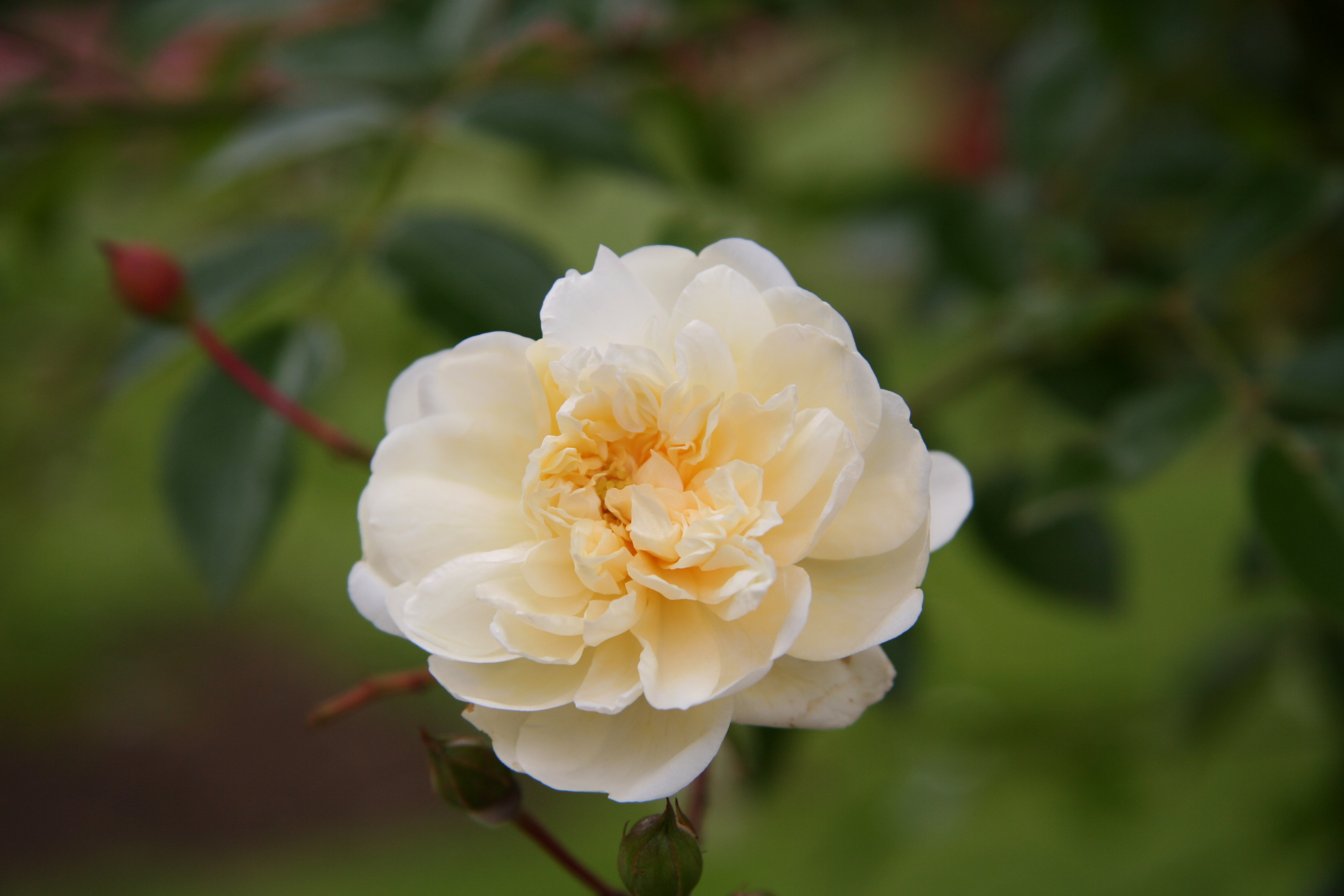
'Albéric Barbier', 1900

During the height of rose production, the Barbier nursery produced some of the most popular and best selling roses at the time, including 'Albertine', 'Alexandre Girault', and 'François Juranville'. The Barbiers roses produced more flowers but were less hardy than ramblers produced from Hybrid Perpetual stock parents. Later ramblers produced by the nursery were more robust. Hardier ramblers like 'Primevère' (1929) and 'Jacotte' (1920) were popular in colder climates, like the New England region of the United States. After eighty years in business, The Barbier nursery closed in 1972. There are 33 Barbier rose cultivars that exist today, all introduced between 1900 and 1930.

=== 'Auguste Gervais' ===
The rose cultivar was bred by René Barbier in 1916 by crossing Rosa lucieae and the yellow hybrid tea rose, 'Le Progrès'. 'Auguste Gervais' is popular in France and throughout Europe. The rose was awarded the Bagatelle (Paris) Certificat de Mérite in 1919.
