= Rosa 'Léontine Gervais' =

Apricot-blend Wichurana Rambler rose cultivar

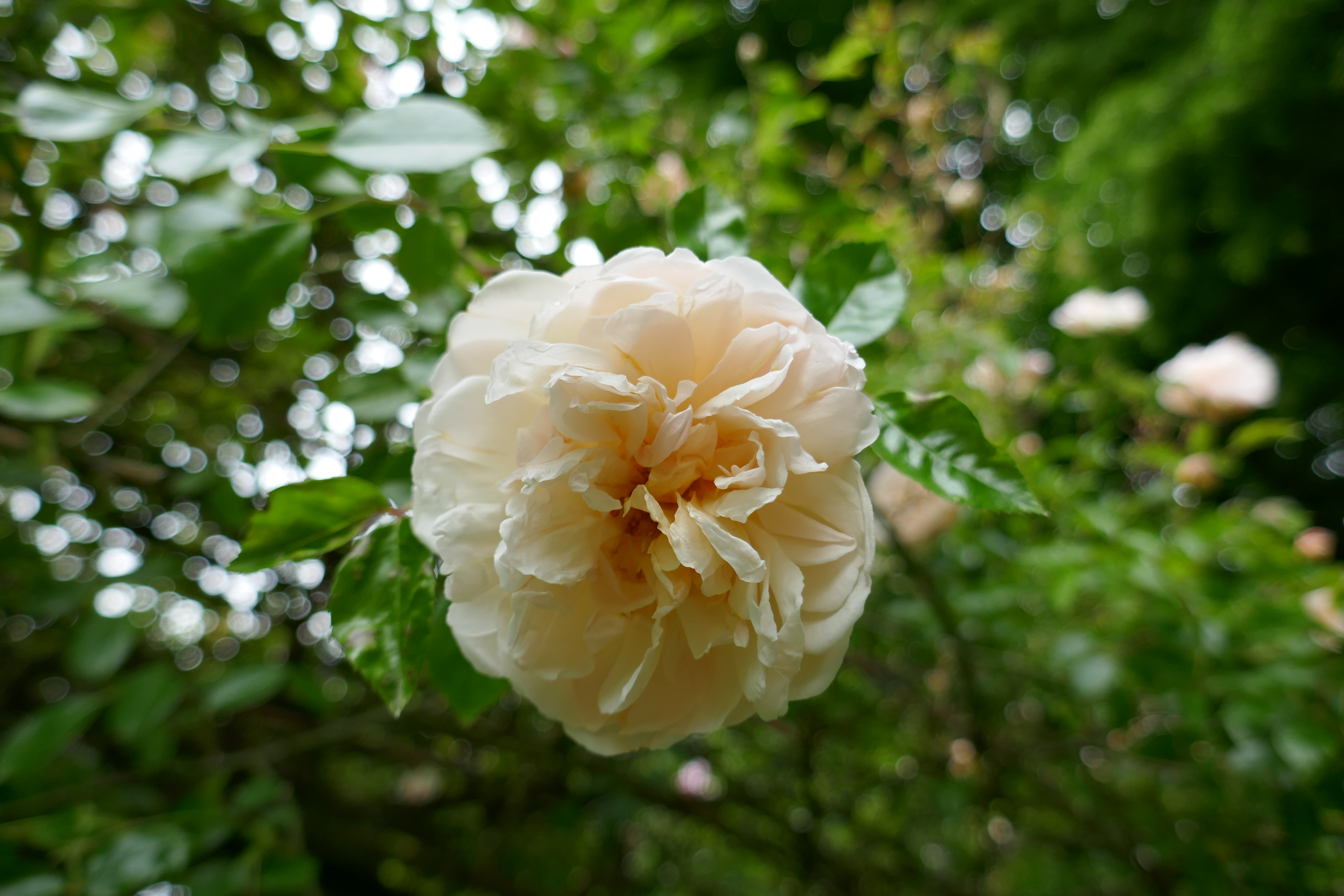
- 'Léontine Gervais'
- Genus: Rosa hybrid
- Hybrid parentage: Rosa lucieae × 'Souvenir de Catherine Guilllot'
- Cultivar group: Hybrid wichurana
- Breeder: René Barbier
- Origin: France, 1903

Rosa 'Léontine Gervais' is an apricot-blend Hybrid wichurana rose cultivar, bred by French rose breeder, René Barbier in 1903. A best selling and popular rambler in the early 20th century, it is often confused with another Barbier rambler, 'Francois Juranville'.

== Description ==
'Léontine Gervais' is a vigorous Wichurana rambler, 10–25 ft (3.0–7.6 m) in height, with an 8–10 ft (2.4–3.0 m) spread. The flowers are medium-sized, on average 2 in (51 mm), with a loosely petalled, semi-double form. The buds are round and copper red, but open into a peach-apricot blend and fade to cream, light pink or white in hot weather. The rose has a strong musky, sweet fragrance and is shade tolerant. Flowers are borne singly or in clusters of 5 to 7 on short stems. The leaves are dark glossy green and the stems will turn red in the sun.

== History ==
=== Barbier Frères & Compagnie ===
The Barbier nursery was founded by Albert Barbier (1845 -1931) and his brother, Eugene, in Olivet, a village near Orleans, France. Albert was a nurseyman who initially worked at the Transon brothers nursery and the D. Dauvesse nursery in Orleans with fellow nurseryman, Paul Transon, as his partner. Barbier took over the management of Transon nurseries in 1872, before starting his own nursery with his brother Eugene in 1894. The Barbier family business initially sold fruit trees, but later began breeding and selling roses. Albert's sons, René (1870-1931), Léon (b 1878), and George later joined the company.

The Barbiers introduced the hybrid Wichurana rose to Europe in the early 1900s. Between 1900 and 1930, René Barbier produced exceptional new rose cultivars, large-flowered rambling roses with strongly scented and beautifully shaped flowers. Barbier developed this new rose variety by crossing Rosa 'lucieae', (a vigorous, trailing species from Japan known for its thick purplish-red canes and glossy, dark green, foliage), and hybrid tea roses.

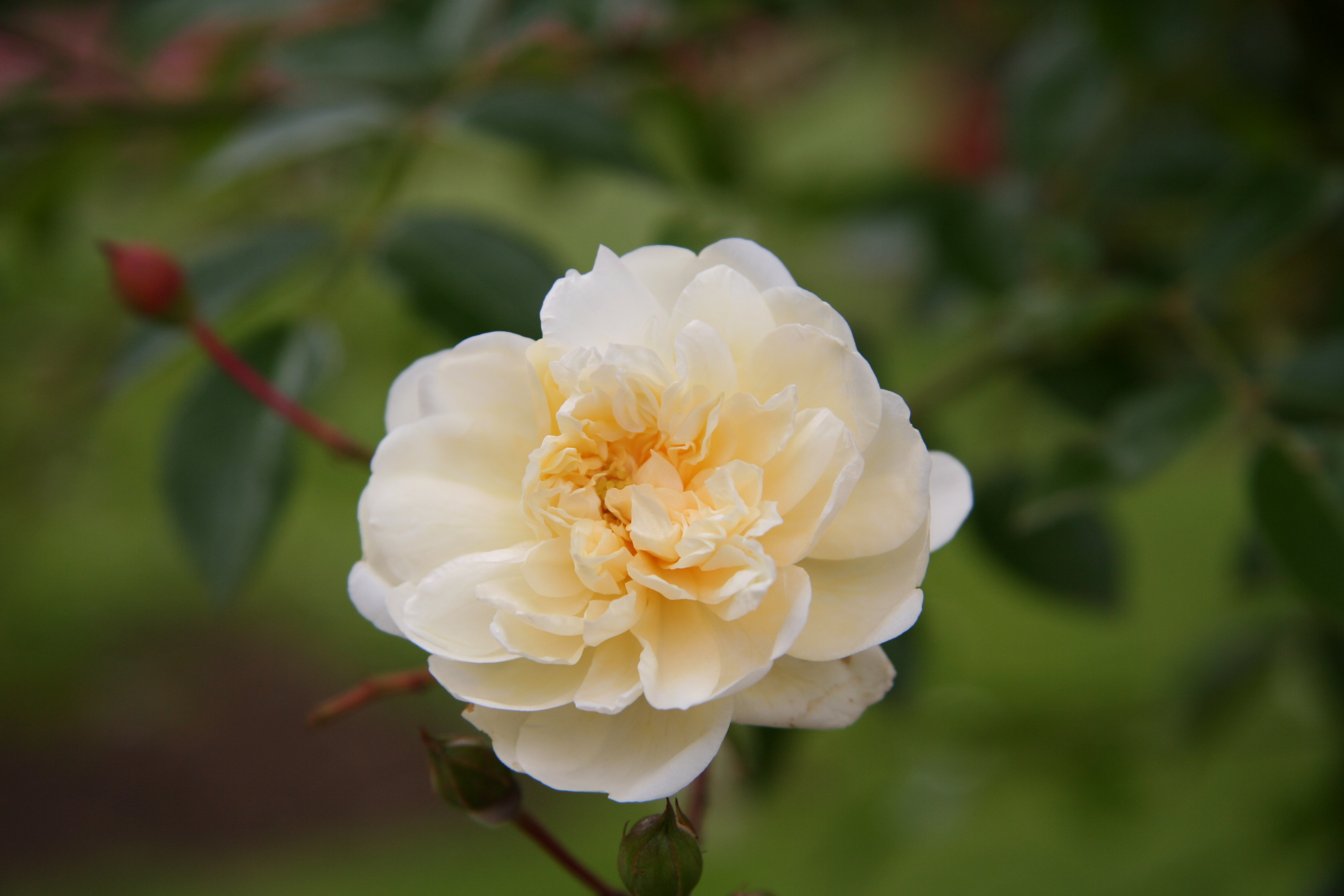
'Alberic Barbier', 1900

During the height of rose production, the Barbier nursery produced some of the most popular and best selling roses at the time, including 'Albertine', 'Alexandre Girault', and 'Francois Juranville'. The Barbiers roses produced more flowers but were less hardy than ramblers produced from Hybrid Perpetual stock parents. Later ramblers produced by the nursery were more robust. Hardier ramblers like 'Primevère' (1929) and 'Jacotte' (1920) were popular in colder climates, like the New England region of the United States. After eighty years in business, The Barbier nursery closed in 1972. There are 33 Barbier rose cultivars that exist today, all introduced between 1900 and 1930.

=== 'Léontine Gervais' ===
'Léontine Gervais' was bred by René Barbier in 1903. He created the cultivar by crossing Rosa lucieae and the red Tea rose, 'Souvenir de Catherine Guillot'. It was introduced in Orleans in 1903. It is very similar to 'Francois Juranville'. The early 'Léontine Gervais' cultivars were a salmon red-blend color. The current rose is a light apricot blend.

== Sources ==
- Phillips, Roger (1993). Quest for the Rose: A Historical Guide to Roses. Random House. ISBN 978-0679435730.
- Olds, Margaret (1998). Botanica's Roses: The Encyclopedia of Roses. Mynah Publishing. ISBN 978-0091838034.
- Quest-Ritson, Brigid; Quest-Ritson, Charles (1993). Encyclopedia of Roses. DK Publishing. ISBN 978-0756688684.
- Scanniello, Stephen; Bayard, Tania (1994). Climbing. Macmillan. ISBN 978-0671850463.
