= Rosa 'Francois Juranville' =

Rose cultivar

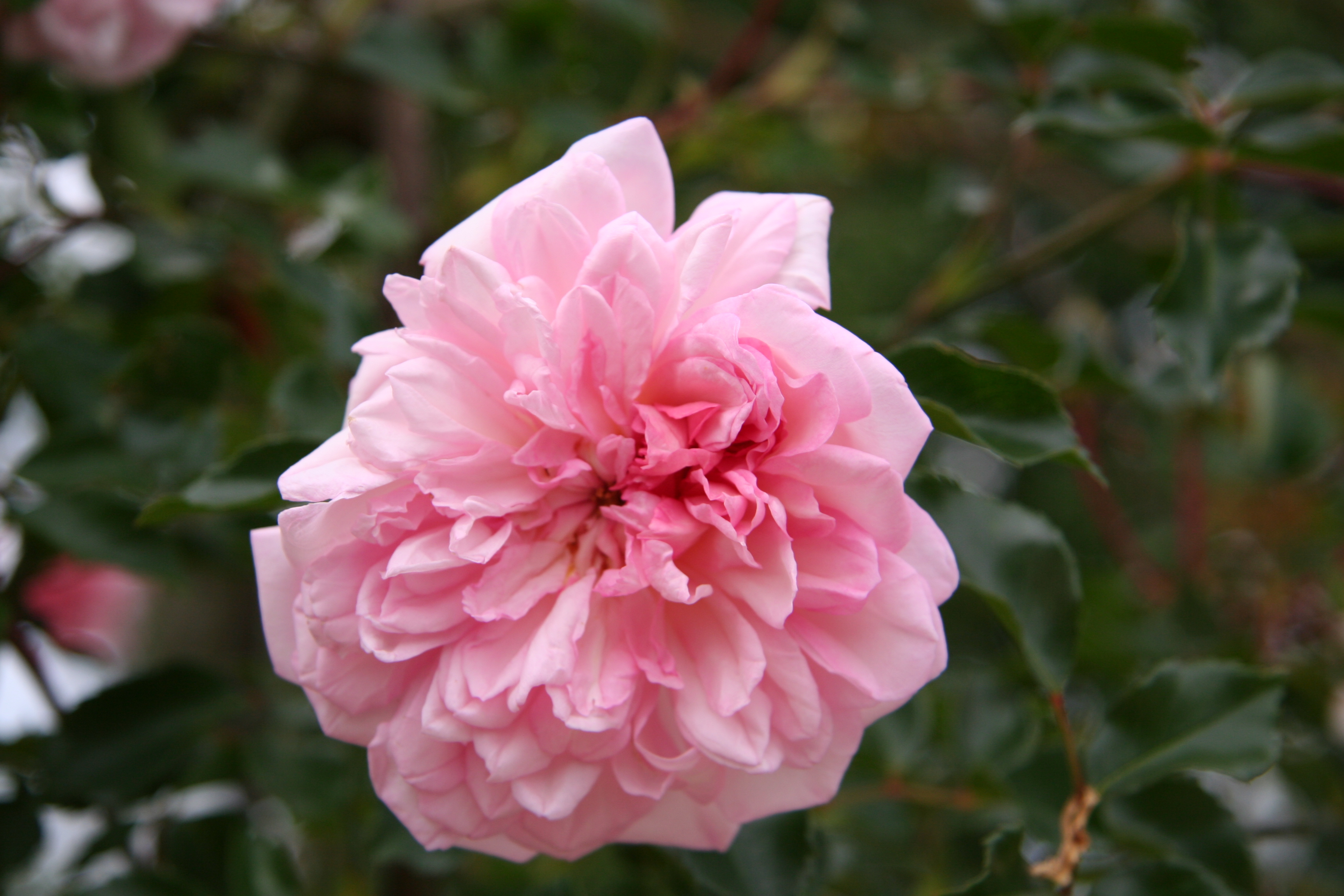
- Rosa 'Francois Juranville'
- Genus: Rosa hybrid
- Hybrid parentage: Rosa lucieae x 'Madame Laurette Messimy'
- Cultivar group: Hybrid wichurana
- Breeder: René Barbier
- Origin: France, 1906

Rosa 'Francois Juranville' is a salmon pink hybrid wichurana, a large-flowered rambling rose that is popular in cooler climates. The cultivar was bred by French rose breeder, René Barbier in 1906. The rose was awarded the Award of Garden Merit (AGM) by the Royal National Rose Society (RNRS) in 1993.

== Description ==
'Francois Juranville' is a hybrid wichurana rose, a robust climber, 15' to 25 ft (457–762 cm) in height, with a 10 ft (300 cm) spread. The flowers have a flat-quartered bloom form. They typically blooms in clusters once a year with a later scattered flowering. 'Francois Juranville' has a strong, fruity fragrance. The flower color is salmon-pink with yellow undertones. The rose makes an excellent cut flower. The foliage is small, tough and bronze green young, maturing to a glossy dark green. The plant has long, slender, flexible stems.

'Francois Juranville' is a very vigorous grower and can climb up into trees. It is very popular in cooler climates where the flowers retain their dark pink color the longest. In hotter climates, the flowers are usually pale pink. The rose has one large flowering, but will bloom sporadically through the summer.

== History ==
=== Barbier Frères & Compagnie ===
The Barbier nursery was founded by Albert Barbier (1845 -1931) and his brother, Eugene, in Olivet, a village near Orleans, France. Albert was a nurseyman. He initially worked at the Transon brothers nursery and the D. Dauvesse nursery in Orleans with fellow nurseryman, Paul Transon, as his partner. Barbier took over the management of Transon nurseries in 1872, before starting his own nursery with his brother Eugene in 1894. The Barbier family business initially sold fruit trees, but later began breeding and selling roses. Albert's sons, René (1870-1931), Léon (b 1878), and George later joined the company.

The Barbiers introduced the hybrid Wichurana rose to Europe in the early 1900s. Between 1900 and 1930, Barbier René produced exceptional new rose cultivars, large-flowered rambling roses with strongly scented and beautifully shaped flowers. Barbier developed this new rose variety by crossing Rosa 'lucieae', (a vigorous, trailing species from Japan known for its thick purplish-red canes and glossy, dark green, foliage), and hybrid tea roses.

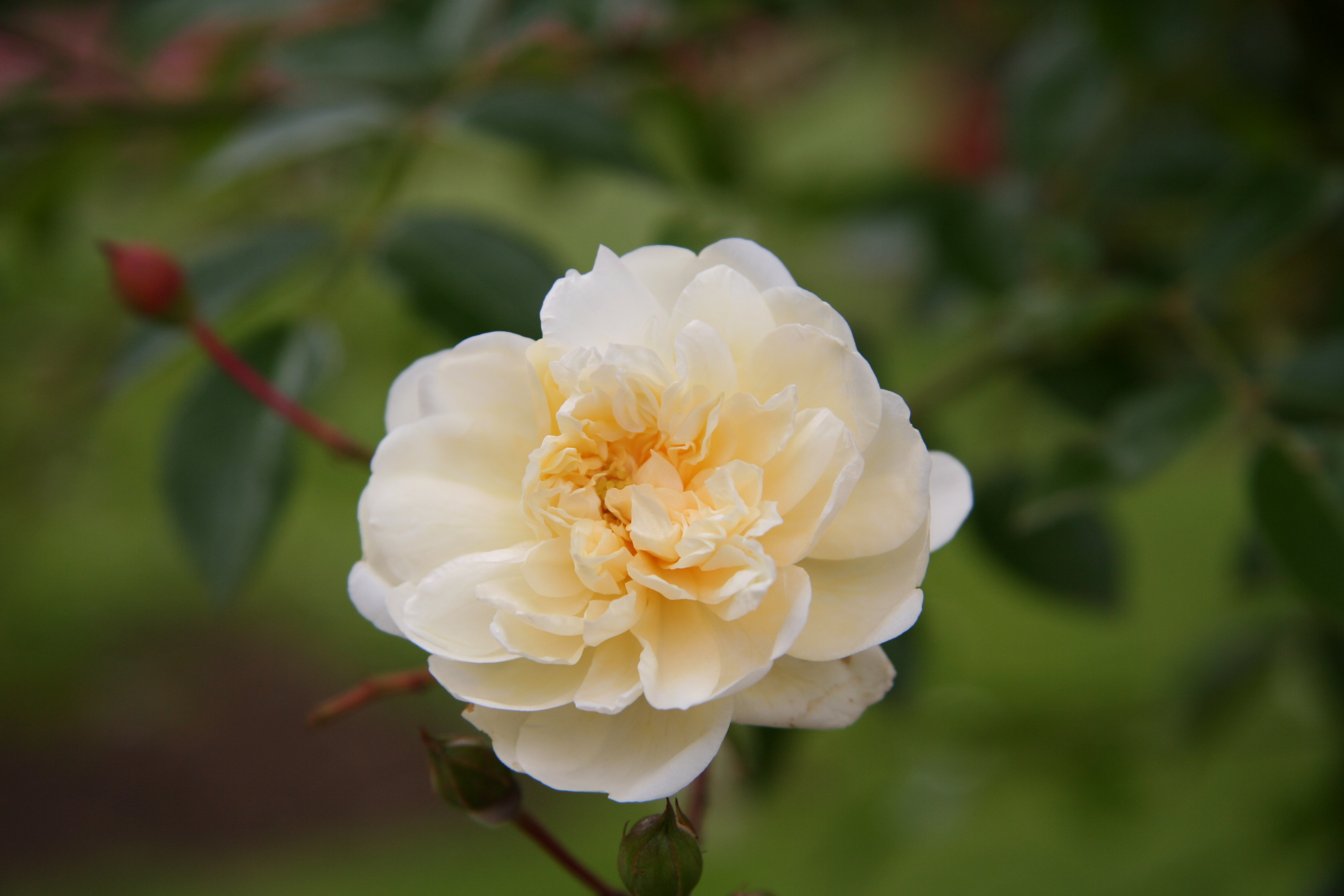
'Alberic Barbier', 1900

During the height of rose production, the Barbier nursery produced some of the most popular and best selling roses at the time, including 'Albertine', 'Alexandre Girault', and 'Francois Juranville'. The Barbiers roses produced more flowers but were less hardy than ramblers produced from Hybrid Perpetual stock parents. Later ramblers produced by the nursery were more robust. Hardier ramblers like 'Primevère' (1929) and 'Jacotte' (1920) were popular in colder climates, like the New England region of the United States.

The Barbier nursery also introduced the first Wichurana Polyantha rose, 'Renoncule' in 1911. After eighty years in business, The Barbier nursery closed in 1972. There are 33 Barbier rose cultivars that exist today, all introduced between 1900 and 1930.

=== 'Francois Juranville' ===
The rose cultivar was bred by René Barbier in 1906 by crossing Rosa lucieae and the salmon-pink hybrid tea rose, 'Madame Laurette Messimy'. 'Francois Juranville' is one of the most popular roses bred by the Barbier Nursery, especially in regions with cooler climates. The rose has been awarded the Award of Garden Merit (AGM) by the Royal National Rose Society (RNRS) in 1993.
