= Barbier Frères & Compagnie =

Former rose nursery near Orleans, France

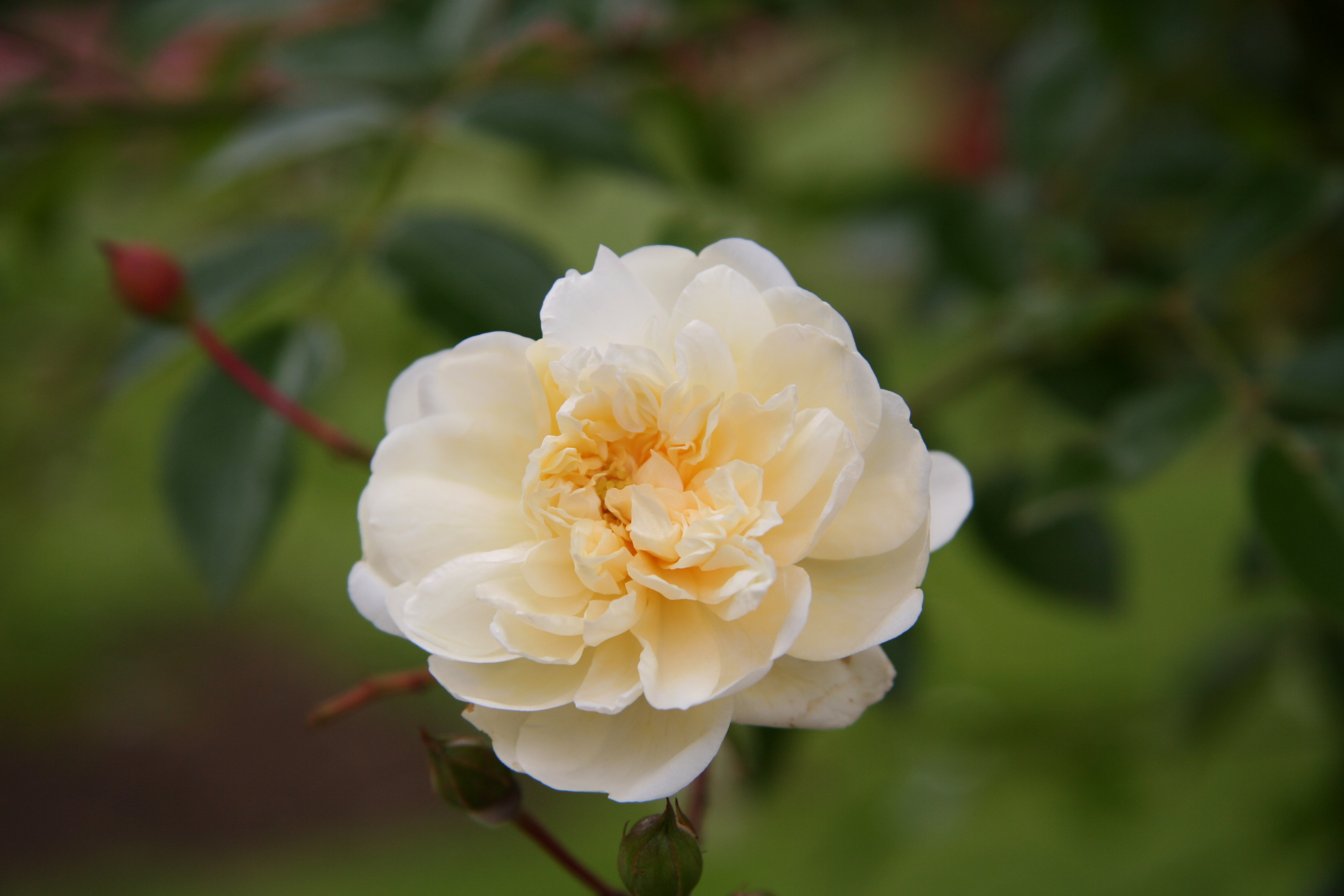
'Alberic Barbier'

Barbier Frères & Compagnie was a commercial rose nursery best known for introducing large-flowered Wichurana ramblers to Europe in the early 1900s. The nursery was established in 1894 by brothers Albert & Eugène Barbier and located in Olivet, near Orleans, France, René Barbier, son of original co-founder, Albert Barbier, led the nursery's rose hybridizing program and is responsible for creating a new type of rambling rose that continues to be popular today. The nursery's most successful rose cultivars include: ''Albéric Barbier' (1900), 'Paul Transon' (1901), 'Alexandre Girault' (1909), and 'Albertine'(1921). The nursery closed in 1972.

== History ==
The Barbier nursery was founded by Albert Barbier (1845–1931) and his brother, Eugène, in Olivet, a village near Orleans, France. Albert was a nurseryman. He initially worked at the Transon brothers nursery and the D. Dauvesse nursery in Orleans with fellow nurseryman, Paul Transon, as his partner. Barbier took over the management of Transon nurseries in 1872, before starting his own nursery with his brother Eugène in 1894. The Barbier family business initially sold fruit trees, but later began breeding and selling roses. Albert's sons, René (1870-1931), Léon (b 1878), and Georges later joined the company.

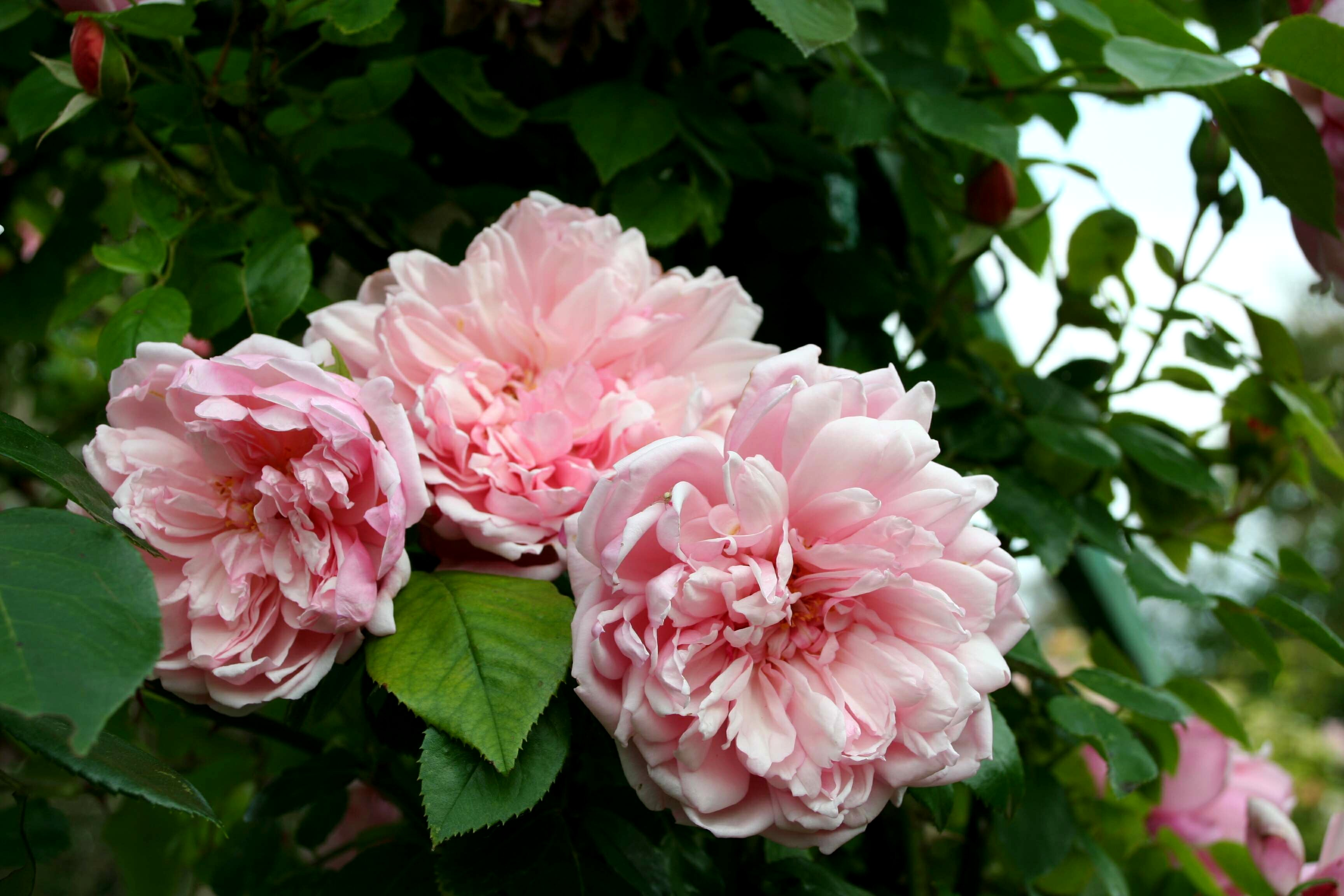
'Albertine'

The Barbier nursery introduced the Wichurana rose to Europe in the early 1900s. The new white hybrid was named in honour of the Prussian botanist, Max Ernst Wichura (1817–1866). Between 1900 and 1930, René Barbier produced exceptional new rose cultivars, large-flowered rambling roses with strongly scented and beautifully shaped flowers. Barbier developed this new rose variety by crossing Rosa 'lucieae', (a vigorous, trailing species from Japan known for its thick purplish-red canes and glossy, dark green, foliage), and hybrid tea roses.

During the height of rose production, the Barbier nursery produced some of the most popular and best selling roses at the time, including 'Albertine', 'Alexandre Girault', and 'François Juranville'. The Barbiers roses produced more flowers but were less hardy than ramblers produced from Hybrid Perpetual stock parents. Later ramblers produced by the nursery were more robust. Hardier ramblers like 'Primevère' (1929) and 'Jacotte' (1920) were popular in colder climates, like the New England region of the United States. The Barbier nursery also introduced the first Wichurana Polyantha rose, 'Renoncule' in 1911. After eighty years in business, The Barbier nursery closed in 1972. There are 33 Barbier rose cultivars that exist today, all introduced between 1900 and 1930. A large collection of Barbier roses can grow in the Roseraie du Val-de-Marne gardens near Paris, France.

== Selected roses ==
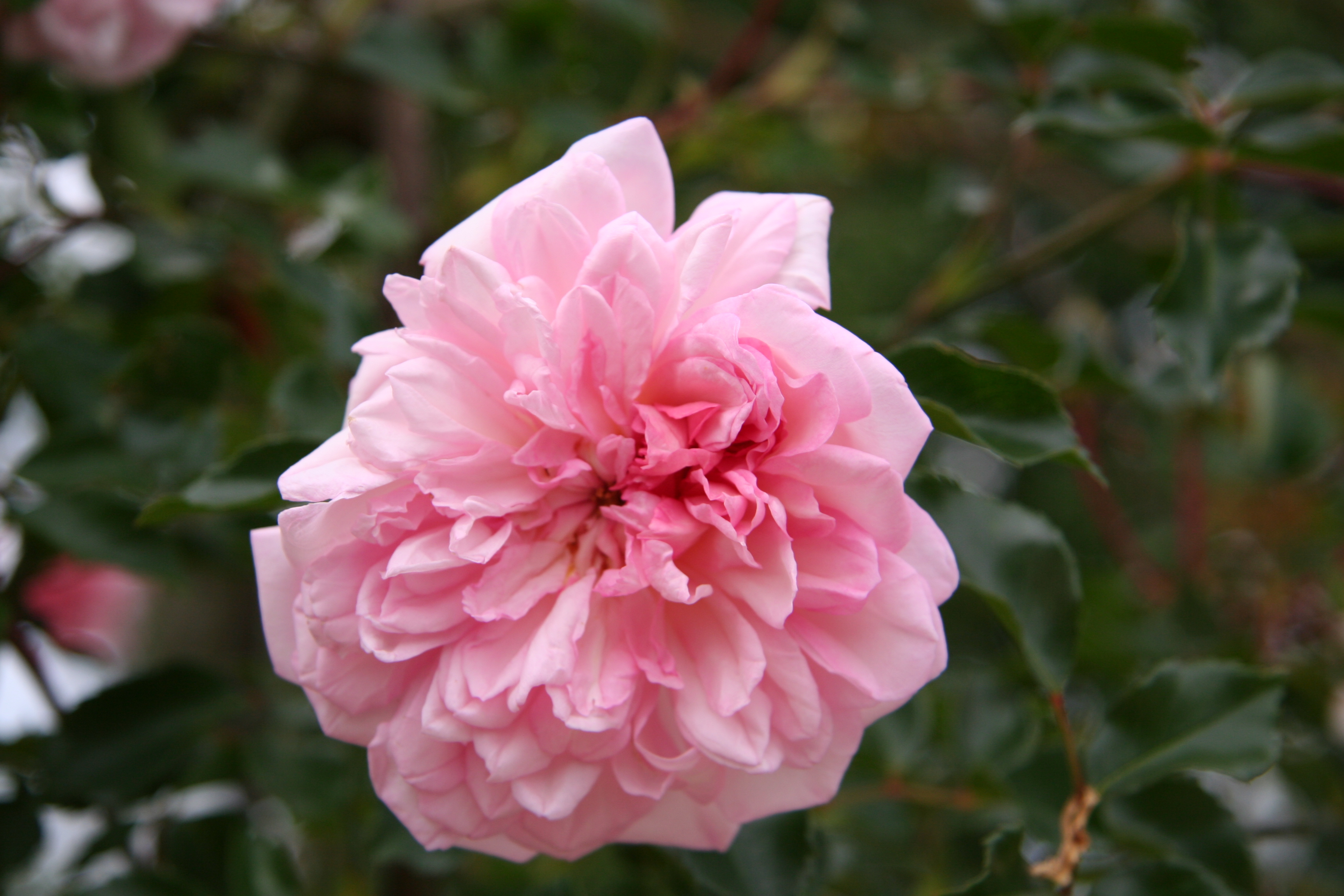
Rosa 'François Juranville', 1906

- 'Albéric Barbier' (1900)
- 'Paul Transon' (1901)
- 'François Foucard' (1901)
- 'Léontine Gervais' (1903)
- 'Alexandre Girault' (1909)
- 'Auguste Gervais' (1918)
- ' Jacotte' (1920)
- 'Albertine' (1921)
- 'Primevère' (1929)
