= Rosa 'Albertine' =

Rose cultivar

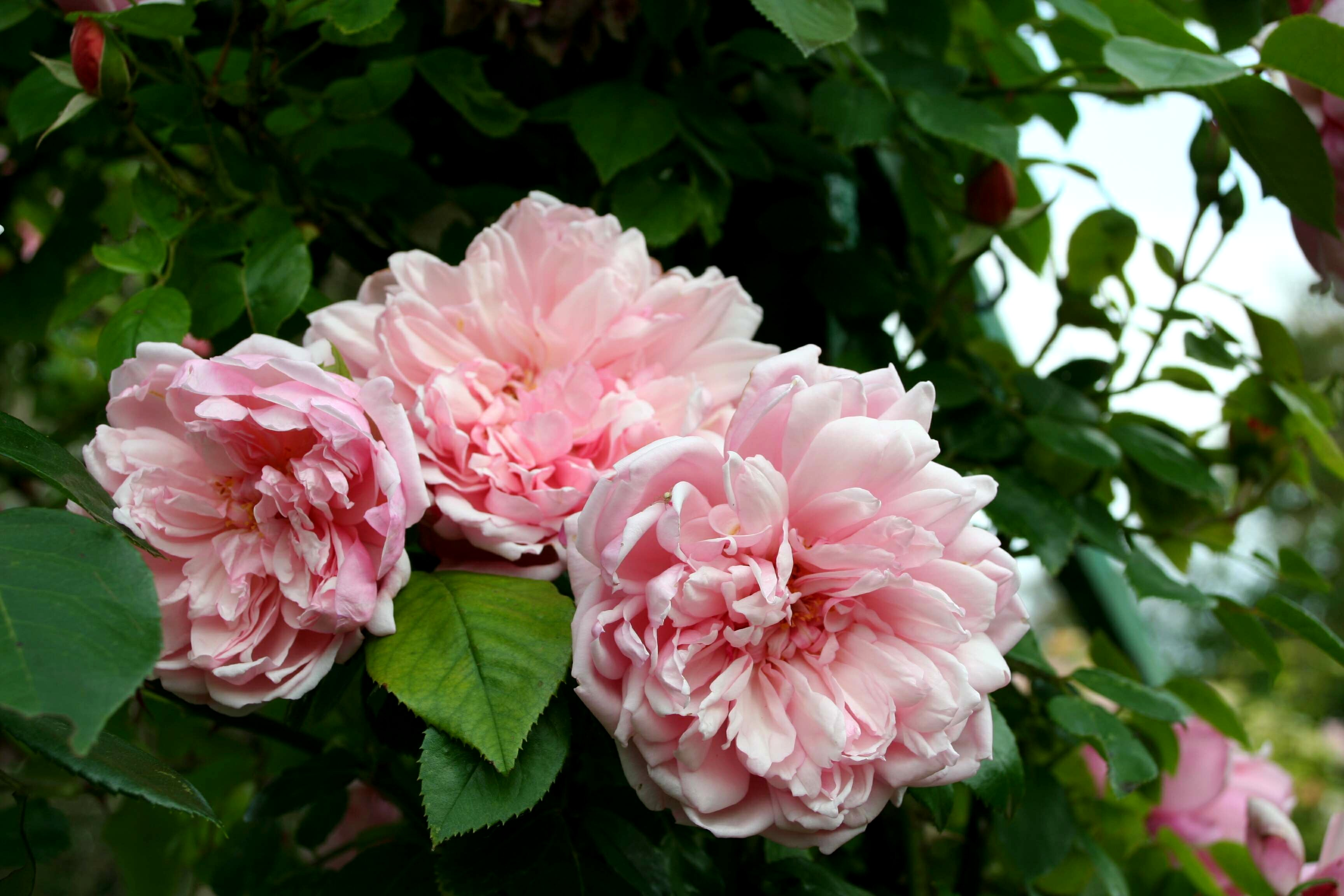
- Rosa 'Albertine'
- Genus: Rosa hybrid
- Hybrid parentage: Rosa wichurana × Mrs. Arthur Robert Waddell
- Cultivar group: Hybrid wichurana
- Breeder: René Barbier, before 1921
- Origin: France, 1923

Rosa 'Albertine' is a salmon-pink hybrid wichurana, a large-flowered rambling rose that blooms in clusters once a year. The cultivar was bred by René Barbier before 1921 and introduced into Australia by Hazlewood Bros. Pty. Ltd. in 1923 as "Albertine". It has been awarded the Award of Garden Merit (AGM) by the Royal National Rose Society (RNRS) in 1993.

== Description ==
"Albertine" is a rambling rose, 6'7 to 20 ft (200–610 cm) in height, with a 10 to 15 ft (305–455 cm) plant spread. The rose has medium (26-40 petals) cupped-shaped, semi-double or fully double flowers. The plant grows well in garden beds and containers. It blooms in clusters once a year, typically in late spring. "Albertine" has a mild to moderate fragrance. The flowers are salmon pink with coral backs, opening from darker reddish-salmon buds. The flowers are composed of irregular petals and bloom in clusters of 3–7. The stems are purple and arching in form and has heavy thorns. The rose makes an excellent cut flower. The foliage is dark green and glossy, but is susceptible to mildew. "Albertine" has been awarded the Award of Garden Merit (AGM) by the Royal National Rose Society (RNRS) in 1993.

== History ==
The Barbier nursery was founded by Albert Barbier (1845–1931) and his brother, Eugene, in Olivet, a village near Orleans, France. Albert was a nurseryman. He initially worked at the Transon brothers nursery and the D. Dauvesse nursery in Orleans with fellow nurseryman, Paul Transon, as his partner. Barbier took over the management of Transon nurseries in 1872, before starting his own nursery with his brother Eugene in 1894. The Barbier family business initially sold fruit trees, but later began breeding and selling roses. Albert's sons, René (1870–1931), Léon (born 1878), and George later joined the company.

The Barbier nursery introduced the hybrid Wichurana rose to Europe in the early 1900s. Between 1900 and 1930, Barbier René produced exceptional new rose cultivars, large-flowered rambling roses with strongly scented and beautifully shaped flowers. Barbier developed this new rose variety by crossing Rosa 'lucieae', (a vigorous, trailing species from Japan known for its thick purplish-red canes and glossy, dark green, foliage), and hybrid tea roses.

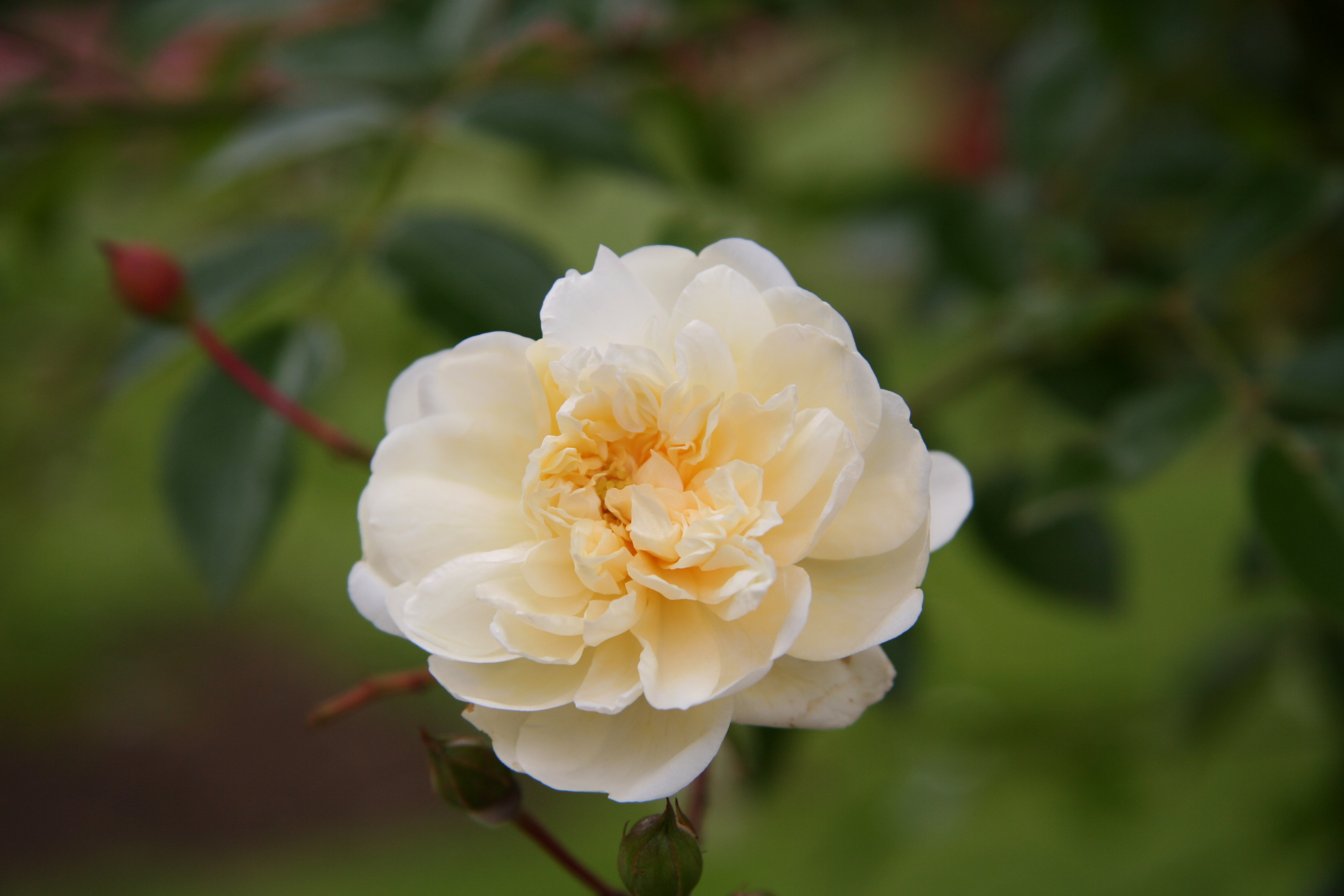
'Alberic Barbier', 1900

During the height of rose production, the Barbier nursery produced some of the most popular and best selling roses at the time, including "Albertine", "Alexandre Girault", and "Francois Juranville". The Barbiers roses produced more flowers but were less hardy than ramblers produced from Hybrid Perpetual stock parents. Later ramblers produced by the nursery were more robust. Hardier ramblers like 'Primavere' (1929) and 'Jacotte' (1920) were popular in colder climates, like the New England region of the United States. The Barbier nursery also introduced the first Wichurana Polyantha rose, "Renoncule" in 1911. After eighty years in business, The Barbier nursery closed in 1972.There are 33 Barbier rose cultivars that exist today, all introduced between 1900 and 1930. A large collection of Barbier roses grow in the Roseraie du Val-de-Marne gardens near Paris, France.

== In culture ==
In her book, Orwell's Roses, Rebecca Solnit writes of George Orwell's love of the Albertine rose.
