= Jules Gravereaux =

French rosarian (1844–1916)

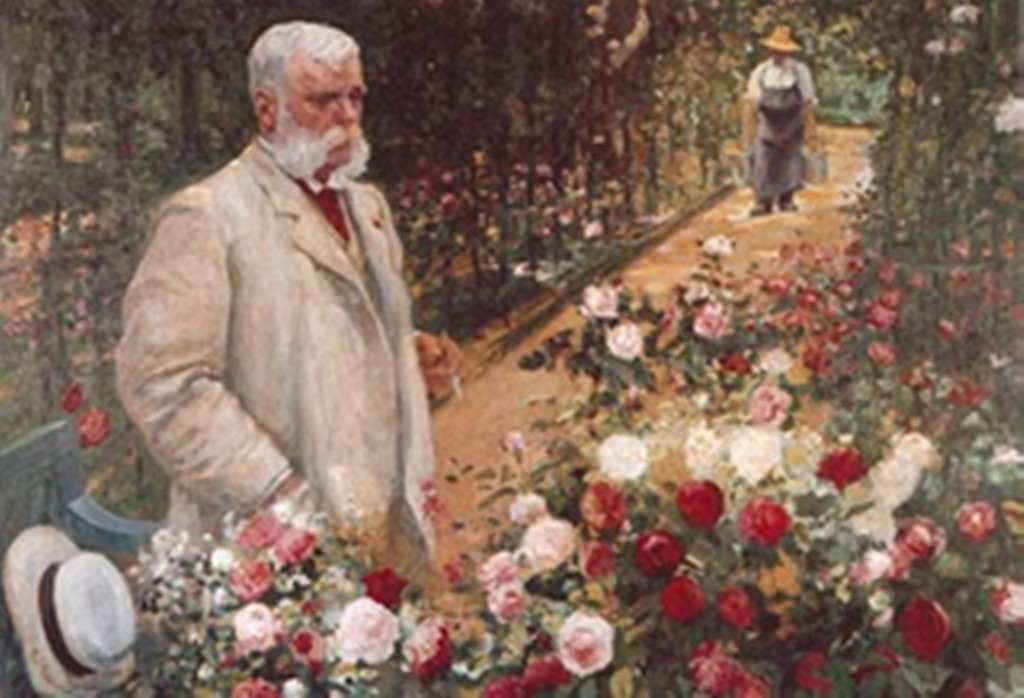
Jules Gravereaux

Jules Léopold Gravereaux (French pronunciation: [ʒyl leɔpɔld ɡʁav(ə)ʁo]; 1 May 1844 in Vitry-sur-Seine – 23 March 1916 in Paris) was a French rosarian. He was a top executive at the department store Le Bon Marché and in 1892 purchased land at the village of L'Haÿ about 8 km south of Paris. There, he built the first ever complete garden devoted exclusively to roses, the Roseraie de L'Haÿ. It became so popular that a few years later the village changed its name to L'Haÿ-les-Roses.

== Biography ==
His parents were Jean Narcisse Gravereaux, carpenter, and Marie Henriette Gervais. In March 1856, at age 12, he was apprenticed to a hatter of rue du Bac. He was hired two years later by the haberdashery of Aristide Boucicault and wife. In 1852, Mr. and Mrs. Boucicault bought the land in front of their shop to build Le Bon Marché. Jules Gravereaux began at Le Bon Marché in 1864 as a private seller and moved up the ranks. He joined the board in 1871.

In August 1873, he married Laure Marie Alexandrine Thuillier (1852-1932). They had seven children, two of whom died in infancy.

Mrs. Boucicault had no children and at her death, she bequeathed all her shares of Le Bon Marché to its employees based on their seniority. Present since the beginning, Jules Gravereaux inherits enough to retire in 1892 at age 48.

While working for Le Bon Marché he became interested in roses while on textile buying trips to Lille. In 1892, he bought a large property in L'Haÿ and hired the famous landscape architect Édouard André to lay out a garden of 1600 roses. Here he hybridized his own roses and made his own rose oil for perfume.

Roseraie de L'Haÿ reached peak capacity at 8000 roses in 1910, every type known at the time.

Jules Gravereaux died in Paris March 23, 1916.

== Other work in roses ==
In 1900, Jules Gravereaux, by now a well known rosarian (an expert cultivator of roses) and rhodologist (a specialist in studying and classifying roses), was hired by Jean-Claude Nicolas Forestier, the Commissioner of Gardens for the city of Paris, to help create the public rose gardens at Château de Bagatelle. He donated 1200 roses for the garden, which is the site of the International New Rose Trial (Concours international de roses nouvelles de Bagatelle).

In 1901, the Ministry of Agriculture asked him to collect wild plants of the genus Rosa and those used in the horticultural and industrial production of rose perfume. He started this mission in the Balkans. Back at L'Haÿ, he decided to create new rose varieties for the production of perfume, which would facilitate the process of distillation. He worked on hybrids of Rosa rugosa and developed the cultivar 'Rose à parfum de L'Haÿ', among others. In all he created 27 new cultivars, primarily for rose oil production.

In 1911, Gravereaux helped recreate the rose collection of Joséphine de Beauharnais at her Château de Malmaison by researching all species and cultivars available in Europe in her lifetime, and donating the 197 roses his research turned up. This list included 107 gallicas, 27 centifolias, 3 mosses, 9 damasks, 22 Bengals, 4 spinosissimas, 8 albas, 3 luteas, 1 musk, and the species alpina, arvensis, banksia, carolina, cinnamomea, clinophylla, laevigata (the Cherokee rose), rubrifolia (aka glauca), rugosa, white and red, sempervirens, and setigera.

== Awards and honours ==
- He was made Chevalier (in 1902) and Officier (in 1910) in the Legion of Honour.
- He was made Commander of Agricultural Merit for his activities in developing interest for rose gardens and rose commerce (around 1900).
- In 1914, the town of L'Haÿ changed its name to L'Haÿ-les-Roses.
- There is a street named after him in L'Haÿ-les-Roses: Avenue Jules Gravereaux.
- In the year 2000, L'Haÿ-les-Roses public park Roseraie de L'Haÿ was commemorated with a marker as part of the official Méridienne verte (Green Meridian). This line is a continuation of the Paris meridian mentioned in the Dan Brown book The Da Vinci Code. This meridian has also been referred to as the Serpent Rouge through the Church of Saint-Sulpice, Paris and as the Rose Line.

== Partial list of publications ==
- Collection botanique du genre Rosa (1899). Botanical collection of the genus Rosa.
- Catalogue des roses cultivées à L'Haÿ (1900). Catalogue of roses grown at L'Haÿ.
- Rapport sur la culture des roses dans la péninsule des Balkans (1901). Report on the cultivation of roses in the Balkan Peninsula.
- Les Roses cultivées à L'Haÿ en 1902. Roses grown at L'Hay in 1902. Essai de classement (1902). Test rankings.
- Manuel pour la description des rosiers (1906). Manual for the description of the Rose.
- Les Roses à parfum et la fabrication de l'essence à la Roseraie de L'Haÿ de 1901 à 1905 (1906). Perfume roses and manufacture of rose oil at the Roseraie de L'Haÿ from 1901 to 1905.
- La Rose dans les sciences, dans les arts et dans les lettres (1906). The Rose in the sciences, arts and letters.
- La Malmaison. Les roses de l'Impératrice Joséphine. The roses of Empress Josephine. 1912.

== Partial list of rose varieties commemorating Jules Gravereaux, his family, and garden ==
- 'La France Victorieuse', Tea rose hybrid
- 'Rhodologue Jules Gravereaux'
- 'Rhodophile Gravereaux'
- Rosa 'Madame Jules Gravereaux'
- Rosa rugosa var. 'Amélie Gravereaux' (named after his daughter)
- Rosa rugosa var. 'Rose à Parfum de l’Haÿ'
- Rosa rugosa var. 'Roseraie de l’Haÿ' (named after the rosarium)
- 'Rosomane Gravereaux'
