= Hôtel de Ville, L'Haÿ-les-Roses =

Town hall in L'Haÿ-les-Roses, France

Hôtel de Ville
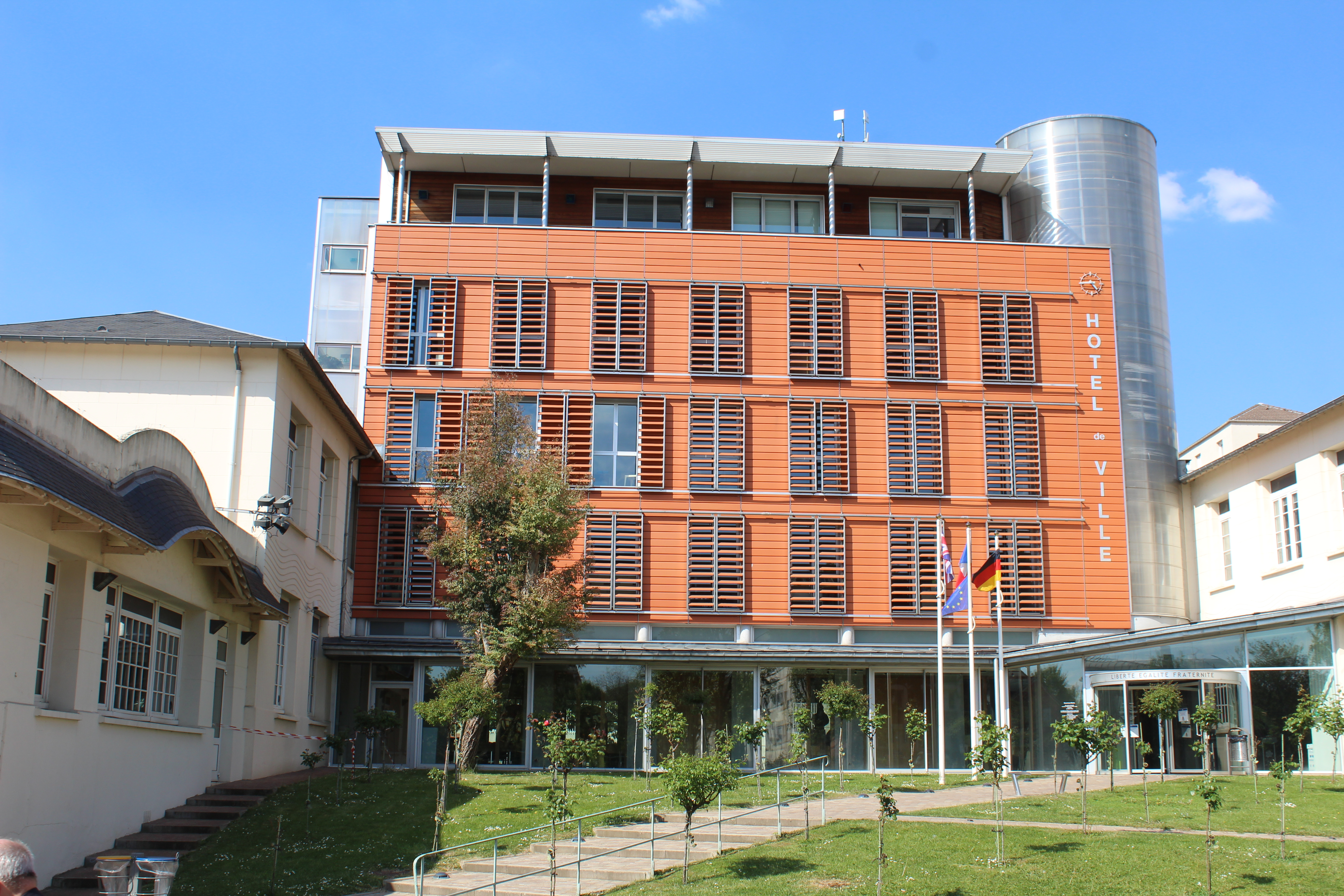
- The main frontage of the Hôtel de Ville in May 2018
- Interactive map of the Hôtel de Ville area

General information
- Type: City hall
- Architectural style: Modern style
- Location: L'Haÿ-les-Roses, France
- Coordinates: 48.7793°N 2.3374°E
- Completed: 2004

Design and construction
- Architects: François and Pierre Lombard

The Hôtel de Ville (French pronunciation: [otɛl də vil], City Hall) is a municipal building in L'Haÿ-les-Roses, Val-de-Marne, in the southern suburbs of Paris, standing on Rue Jean-Jaurès. It has been included on the Inventaire général des monuments by the French Ministry of Culture since 1996.

== History ==
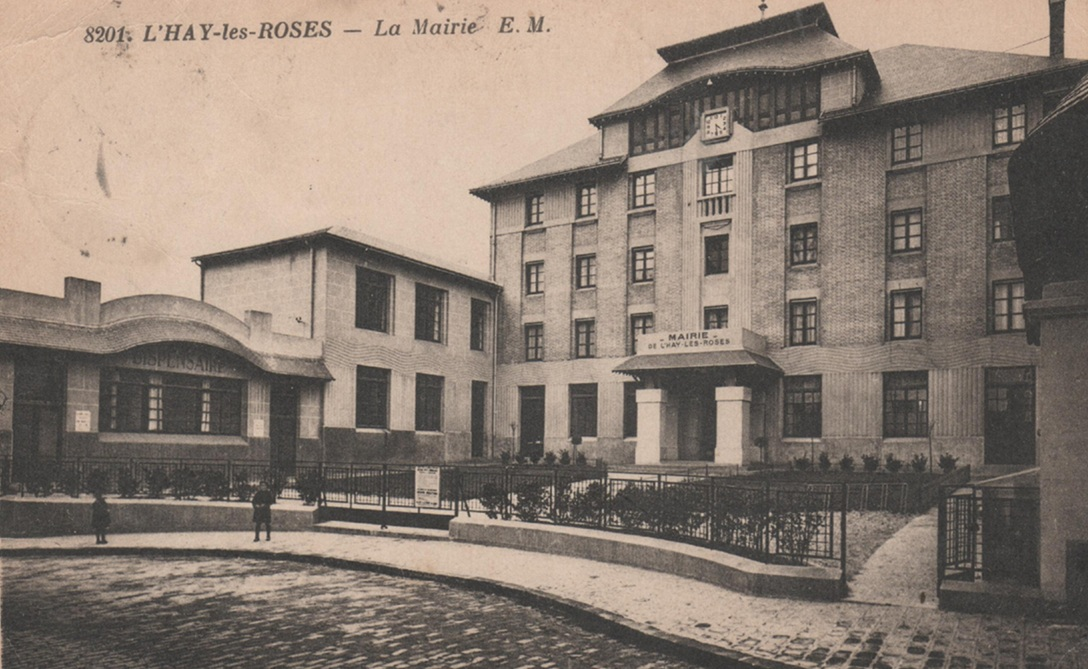
The town hall as it appeared for much of the 20th century

Following the French Revolution, the town council initially met in the house of the mayor at the time. This arrangement continued until the council commissioned a combined school and town hall on Place de l'Église, to the southeast of the Church of Saint-Léonard, in the early 19th century. The council led by the mayor, Pierre Bronzac, instructed that the building be refurbished in the mid-19th century.

In the early 20th century, the council decided to acquire a more substantial property. The building they selected was on the north side of Rue du Val (now Rue Jean-Jaurès). The building was commissioned by Pierre Claude Amyot, who was a lawyer to the Parlement of Paris and died in 1757. The building was designed in the neoclassical style, built in brick with a cement render finish and dated back at least to the first half of the 18th century. The design involved a symmetrical main frontage, two storeys high, facing onto Rue du Val. It was acquired by the Flouquet family in 1819 and was refurbished by Jean-Baptiste Flouquet when he was mayor between 1864 and 1865. After that, it came into the ownership of the Parish of Saint-Nicolas-du-Chardonnet in 1881, before being acquired by the council in 1903. A major programme of refurbishment works, involving the addition of two new floors, was then carried out to a design by the architect, Sieur Guilloux, and completed in 1906.

Internally, the principal rooms were the Salle du Conseil (council chamber) and the Salle des Mariages (wedding room). The wedding room was decorated by a series of landscapes by the painter, Henry-Eugène Delacroix, created between 1908 and 1911. Two stained glass windows, depicting fishing and hunting, were created by Jacques Grüber and installed on the staircase in 1926. A white marble sculpture, depicting Marianne supported by allegories of science and literature, was created by Edme Marie Cadoux in the late 19th century, given to the council by the Department of the Seine and placed in the town hall in 1927.

Following a significant increase in population, the council led by the mayor, Louis Pasquier, instructed that the building be enlarged by the addition of an extra floor and two new wings, both of which were projected forward, between 1929 and 1930. The west wing accommodated the dispensary, while the east wing accommodated the caretaker's house. The work was carried out to a design by the municipal architect, Antoinne Marcilloux.

The main building was badly damaged in a fire in June 2002. It was subsequently demolished and replaced by a five-storey building which was designed by François and Pierre Lombard in the modern style, built in concrete and glass and was completed in September 2004. The design involved a wide glass porch on the ground floor, red panelling on the first, second and third floors, a recessed fourth floor with a canopy, and a cylindrical aluminium-clad stair tower on the right.

During the Nahel Merzouk riots in June 2023, the reception area was vandalized and windows were broken. The mayor, Vincent Jeanbrun, whose home was also attacked, instructed that the town hall be protected with barricades and barbed wire fencing and decided to spend the night there to monitor the security situation.
