= Rosa 'Albéric Barbier' =

Rose cultivar

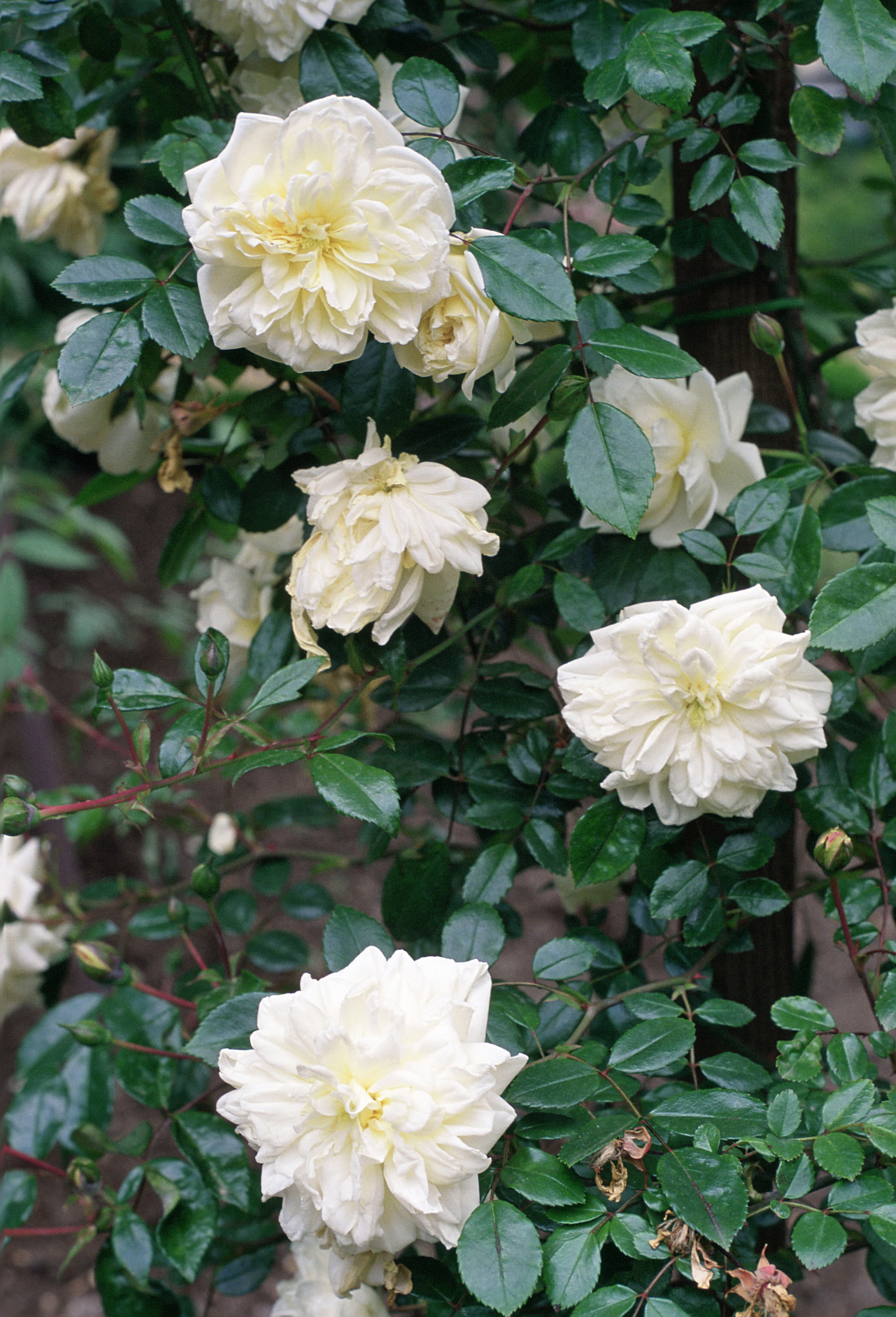
- Genus: Rosa hybrid
- Hybrid parentage: 'Shirley Hibberd' × R. wichurana
- Cultivar group: Hybrid wichurana
- Cultivar: Albéric Barbier
- Origin: Barbier (France, 1900)

Rosa 'Albéric Barbier' is a popular Hybrid wichurana rose cultivar that was bred in 1900 by Barbier Frères & Compagnie. Its parents were R. wichurana and the yellow hybrid tea 'Shirley Hibberd' (Levet père, 1874), named after the Victorian gardening writer (1825–1890).

'Albéric Barbier' has apricot-yellow buds that open to medium-sized, cream coloured flowers with a light yellow center, and quickly fade to white with a hint of lemony yellow. They have an average diameter of 8 cm (3"), 9 to 16 petals, and a strong fruity fragrance. The flowers appear mostly solitary or in small clusters in an opulent single flush in June. The bloom form is globular and quartered, the filling can vary from semi-double to more densely filled, resembling tea roses.

It is a vigorous shrub, growing 4 to 8 metres (13 to 26 ft) high and 3 to 4 m (9.8 to 13.1 ft) wide, with long arching stems. The small leaves are dark green and very glossy, as is typical of wichuraiana hybrids, and create a nice contrast to the light flowers. The young shoots are red and have almost no prickles. If not trained when still flexible, they crawl along the ground in all directions. 'Albéric Barbier' is a robust plant, useful for covering fences or unsightly walls, even those facing north since it is shade tolerant. It can also grow in full sun but doesn't prosper in hot spots or harsher climates. In mild regions the cultivar is semi-evergreen since the leaves remain long on the plant. It is winter hardy down to −15 °C (USDA zone 7b). It is generally disease resistant but can be susceptible to mildew.

This rose gained the Royal Horticultural Society's Award of Garden Merit in 1993.
