= Max Ernst Wichura =

German lawyer and botanist

Max Ernst Wichura (27 January 1817 in Neisse – February 1866 in Berlin) was a German lawyer and botanist.

A lawyer by vocation, he studied jurisprudence in Breslau and Bonn. In 1859 he was appointed as a government councillor (Regierungsrath) in Breslau, a position he maintained until his death in 1866.

He studied botany as a gymnasium student in Breslau, where one of his instructors was Friedrich Wimmer. As a law student at Bonn, he continued his botanical research, conducting studies on plant shoot morphology and systematics, especially of freshwater algae and mosses. During the summer of 1846, he embarked on a botanical excursion to Austrian Silesia, and ten years later, took part in an expedition to Lapland (1856). Afterwards, he performed cryptogamic investigations on trips to the Alps and Carpathians. In 1859, he participated as a botanist on a Prussian expedition to Eastern Asia, where he visited Singapore, Manila and various coastal areas of China and Japan.

As a botanist, he was an expert on the willow genus Salix. Known for his pioneer research involving plant hybrids, he is credited with recreating a number of naturally occurring hybrids. He corresponded with Charles Darwin in regards to hybridization, and Gregor Mendel was familiar with his research on willow hybrids. The popular rose species Rosa wichuraiana is named after him, as is the subgenus Wichuraea, circumscribed by Max Joseph Roemer in 1847.

== Selected works ==
- Aus vier Welttheilen : eine Reise-Tagebuch in Briefen, 1868.
- Die Bastardbefruchtung im Pflanzenreich : erlaütert an den Bastarden der Weiden, 1885.
