= L'Haÿ-les-Roses =

- Subprefecture and commune
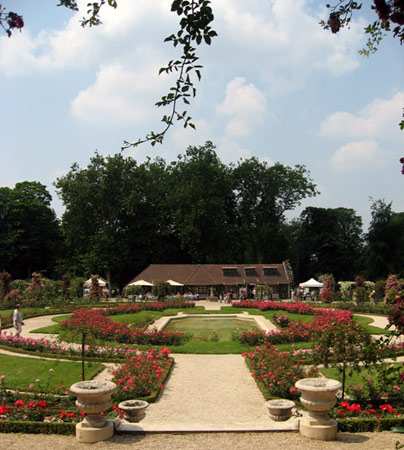
- The Norman Pavillon at the Roseraie du Val-de-Marne

- Coat of arms

- Location (in red) within Paris inner suburbs
- Location of L'Haÿ-les-Roses
- Location within France Location within Île-de-France (region)
- Coordinates: 48°46′48″N 2°20′15″E
- Country: France
- Region: Île-de-France
- Department: Val-de-Marne
- Arrondissement: L'Haÿ-les-Roses
- Canton: L'Haÿ-les-Roses
- Intercommunality: Grand Paris

Government
  - Mayor (2026–32): Clément Decrouy
- Area^{1}: 3.8 km^{2} (1.5 sq mi)
- Highest elevation: 110 m (360 ft)
- Lowest elevation: 45 m (148 ft)
- Population (2023): 31,188
  - Density: 8,200/km^{2} (21,000/sq mi)
- Time zone: UTC+01:00 (CET)
  - Summer (DST): UTC+02:00 (CEST)
- INSEE/Postal code: 94038 /94240
- ^{1} French Land Register data, which excludes lakes, ponds, glaciers > 1 km^{2} (0.386 sq mi or 247 acres) and river estuaries.

L'Haÿ-les-Roses (French pronunciation: [laj le ʁoz]) is a commune in the southern suburbs of Paris, France. It is located 8.5 km (5.3 mi) from the centre of Paris. L'Haÿ-les-Roses is a subprefecture of the Val-de-Marne département, being the seat of the Arrondissement of L'Haÿ-les-Roses. The current mayor, serving until 2026, is Vincent Jeanbrun, from the Republicans party.

L'Haÿ-les-Roses owes the second part of its name to the Roseraie du Val-de-Marne rose garden located there.

== Name ==
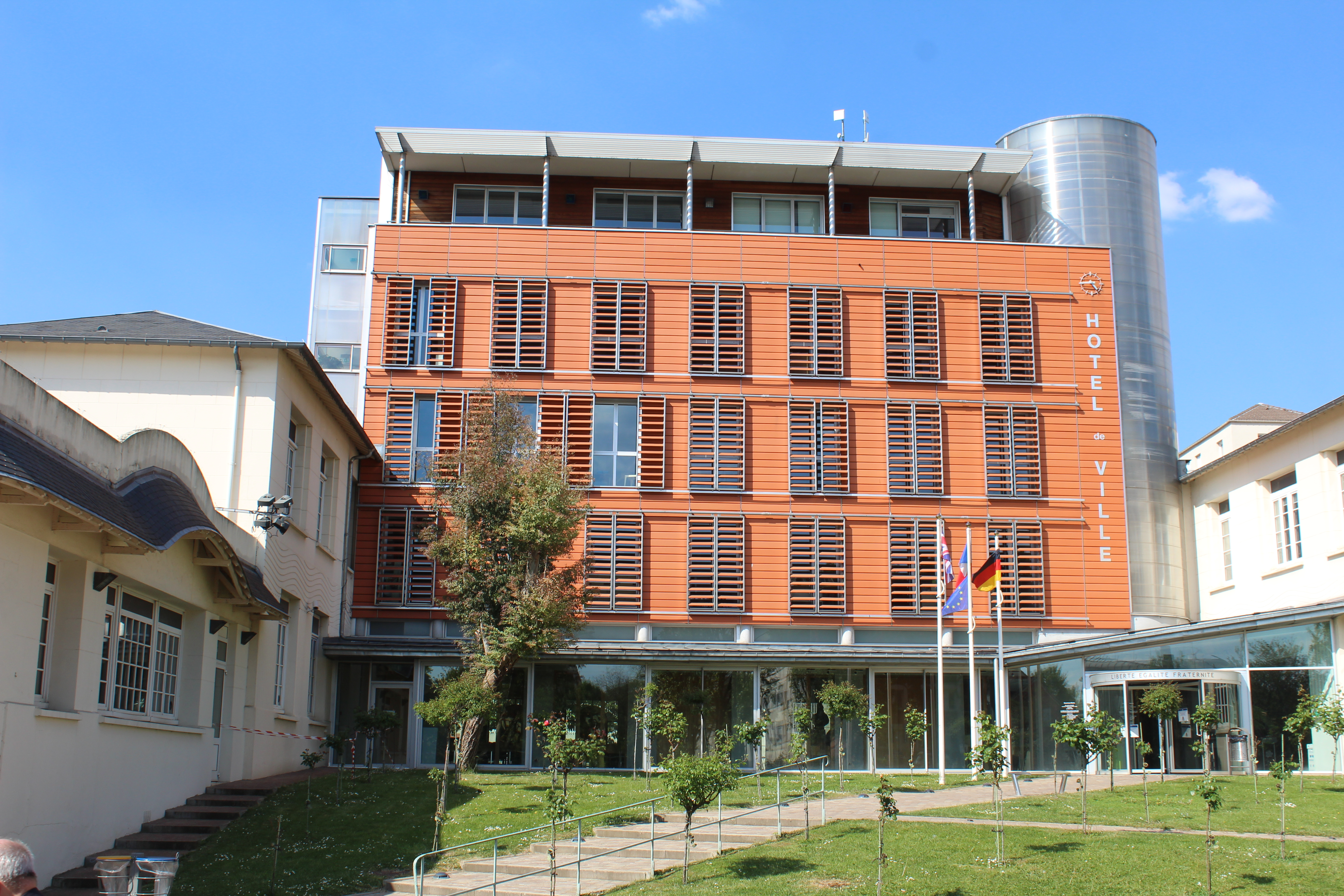
The Hôtel de Ville

The commune of L'Haÿ-les-Roses was originally called simply L'Haÿ. The name was recorded for the first time in a charter of Charlemagne in 798 as Laiacum, sometimes also spelt Lagiacum, meaning "estate of Lagius", a Gallo-Roman landowner. The name was later corrupted into Lay, Lahy, before it eventually went back to L'Haÿ.

In May 1914 the name of the commune became officially L'Haÿ-les-Roses (meaning "L'Haÿ the roses") in honour of the Roseraie du Val-de-Marne (or Roseraie de L'Haÿ), the renowned rose garden created in 1899 by Jules Gravereaux, one of the founders of the Bon Marché department store in Paris.

The Hôtel de Ville was rebuilt between 2002 and 2004.

It is one of the very few French communes with a "ÿ" in its name. A full list of French toponyms containing "ÿ" can be found here.

== Demographics ==
Historical population

Year	Pop.	±% p.a.
1793	331	—
1821	357	+0.27%
1846	477	+1.17%
1872	607	+0.93%
1886	661	+0.61%
1891	760	+2.83%
1896	816	+1.43%
1901	1,011	+4.38%
1906	1,141	+2.45%
1911	1,315	+2.88%
1921	2,202	+5.29%
1926	4,094	+13.21%
1931	6,369	+9.24%

Year	Pop.	±% p.a.
1936	7,707	+3.89%
1946	8,016	+0.39%
1954	10,278	+3.16%
1962	17,968	+7.23%
1968	24,352	+5.20%
1975	31,412	+3.70%
1982	29,568	−0.86%
1990	29,746	+0.08%
1999	29,660	−0.03%
2007	29,357	−0.13%
2012	31,168	+1.20%
2017	31,204	+0.02%
2023	31,188	−0.01%

Source: EHESS and INSEE (1968–2023)

== Education ==
Primary schools in the commune:

- Seven preschools: Blondeaux, La Roseraie, Garennes, Jardin Parisien, Lallier I, Lallier II, Vallée-aux-Renards
- Seven elementary schools: Blondeaux, Centre, Jardin Parisien A, Jardin Parisien B, Lallier A, Lallier B, Vallée-aux-Renards

Junior high schools: Collège Pierre de Ronsard and Collège Chevreul.

Senior high schools/sixth-form colleges are in surrounding municipalities:

- Lycée Frédéric Mistral - Fresnes
- Lycée d’enseignement général et technologique Gustave Eiffel - Cachan
- Lycée polyvalent Maximilien Sorre - Cachan
- Lycée polyvalent Pauline Roland Chevilly-Larue - Chevilly-Larue

== Transport ==
- Paris Métro Line 14 : L'Haÿ-les-Roses station.

== Notable people ==
- Arthur Bernède (1871–1937), playwright and novelist
- Michel Eugène Chevreul (1786–1889), chemist
- Marcelle Géniat (1881–1959), actress
- Pierre Gandon (1899–1990), illustrator and engraver of postage stamps.
- Alain Delon (1935–2024), actor, singer, filmmaker and businessman
- Jean-Marc Rouvière (1958), essayist
- Franck Lagorce (1968), automobile race driver
- Cécile Cinélu (1970), athlete
- Clémence Poésy (1982), actress and model
- Alaixys Romao (1984), footballer

== International relations ==
L'Haÿ-les-Roses is twinned with:

- Omagh, United Kingdom
- Bad Hersfeld, Germany

== See also ==
- Communes of the Val-de-Marne department
