= Concours international de roses nouvelles de Bagatelle =

Rose competition held in France

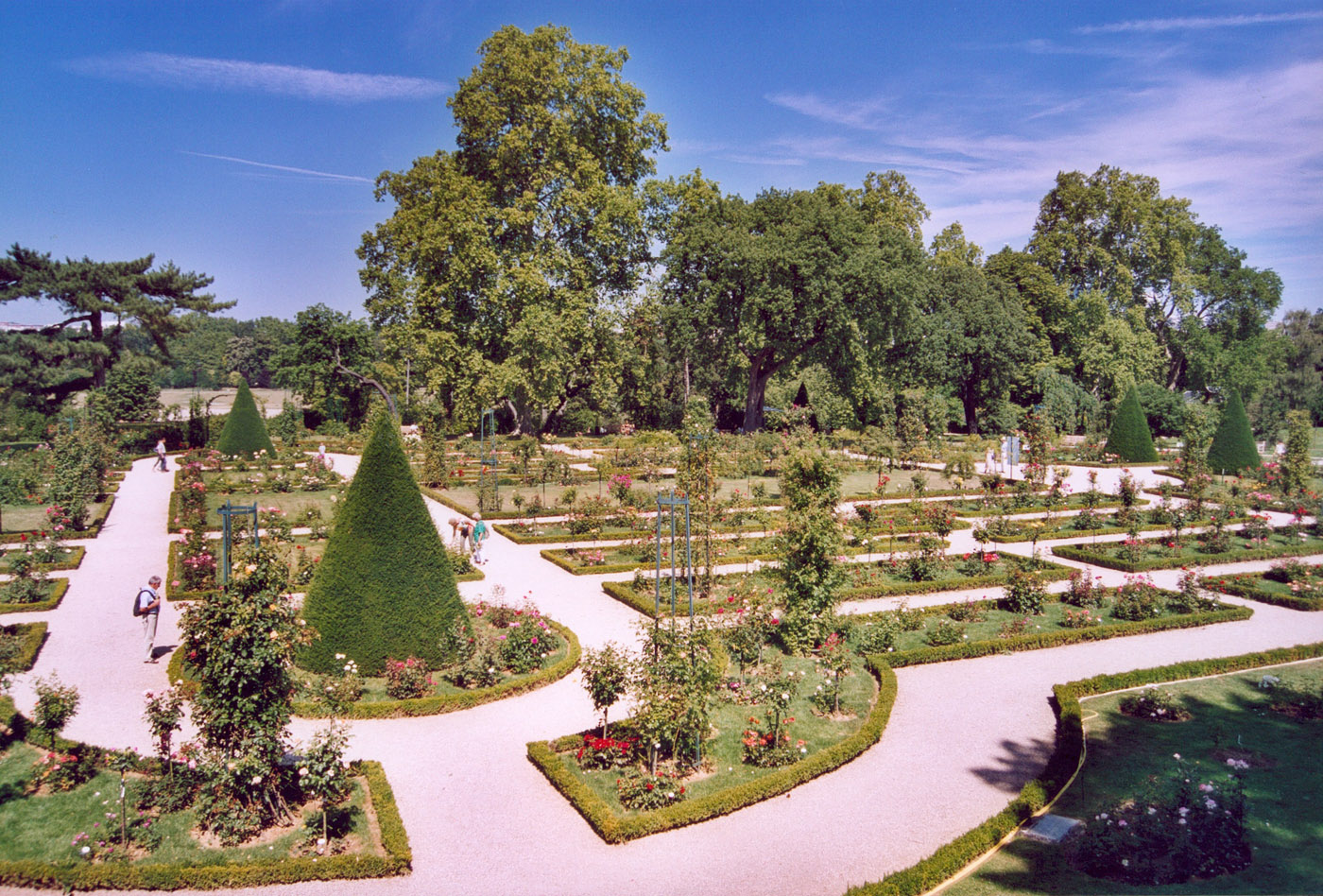
The rose garden at Parc de Bagatelle

Concours international de roses nouvelles de Bagatelle (International competition for new roses) is held in June of each year in the rose trial grounds of the Château de Bagatelle in Paris's 16th arrondissement.

Established in 1907 by Jean-Claude Nicolas Forestier, the city's Commissioner of Gardens, it was the first international competition to assess new roses and remains one of the most prestigious events in the commercial rose growers' calendar. The first competition involved 148 new varieties presented by 27 French rose breeders and 31 growers from around the world. In 1986, an international competition for landscape roses was added, which concerns varieties of hardy roses.

The 115th competition was held in June 2022 in the Parc de Bagatelle, where horticulturists, rose growers, landscape gardeners, specialised journalists, perfumers and rose enthusiasts participated in a years-long selection process to identify this year's award-winners for the most beautiful and the most fragrant new rose hybrids.

The roses to be judged each year have been submitted two years or more in advance by professional and amateur growers and hybridisers. Each new variety will have been grown on-site for two growing cycles in the gardens at Bagatelle. The plants are identified by a number only and are anonymously subjected to examination by a permanent commission of rose and gardening professionals. The plants are scored based upon multiple criteria such as vigor, disease resistance, foliage and growth habit, weeks of flowering and the number of flowers produced, as well as the quality, color and fragrance of the blooms.

An international grand jury of rose specialists from various backgrounds, gardening and rose enthusiasts, artists and others is convened on an appointed day in June of each year to deliver their impressions of the roses thus presented for judging. A separate "novelty commission" of rose creators will also render their assessment as to whether each rose may truly be considered "new." For each rose entered in competition, the compiled scores of the permanent commission comprise 50% of the grades assigned in the judging, while the novelty commission and the grand jury each account for 25% of the final scores awarded. A first prize gold medal, second prize and a perfume prize are awarded annually in addition to certificates giving special recognition to roses in specific categories. Prizes announced each year also include two selections as judged by the public, one for a favorite overall rose and one for best fragrance, as well as two children's selections and a rose-of-the-year jury prize that is selected by the AJJH, an association for garden and horticulture journalists.
