= Rosa 'Primevère' =

Yellow wichurana rose cultivar

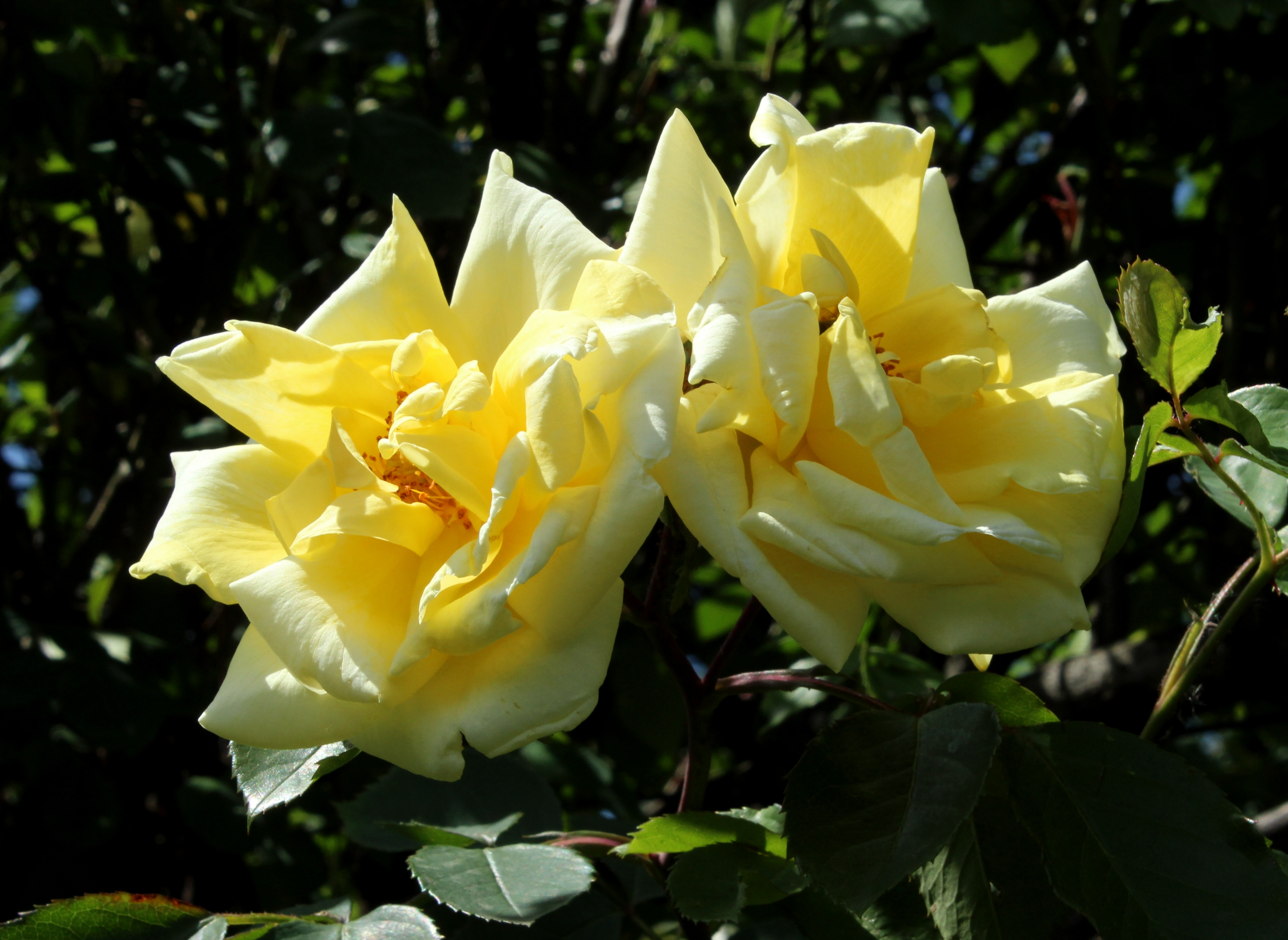
- Rosa 'Primevère'
- Genus: Rosa hybrid
- Cultivar group: Hybrid wichurana
- Breeder: René Barbier
- Origin: France, 1929

Rosa 'Primevère' is a yellow hybrid wichurana, a large-flowered climbing rose. The cultivar was bred by French rose breeder, René Barbier in 1929. It is thought to be the best yellow large-flowered Wichurana rambler.

== Description ==
'Primevère' is a hybrid wichurana, a large-flowered climber, 10' to 13 ft (304–396 cm) in height. The flowers bloom in clusters once a year with some minimal later flowering. The average bloom diameter is 4" (10 cm). The rose has a mild fragrance. The flower color ranges from a light primrose yellow to a bright canary yellow. The rose makes an excellent cut flower as individual flowers can survive for several days. Flowers are borne singly or in long-stemmed clusters of up to five flowers. 'Primevère's is a vigorous grower, producing long flexible canes with many prickles which help the plant to climb. The foliage is medium-sized, glossy, dark green and abundant. The plant is susceptible to frost.

== History ==
=== Barbier Frères & Compagnie ===
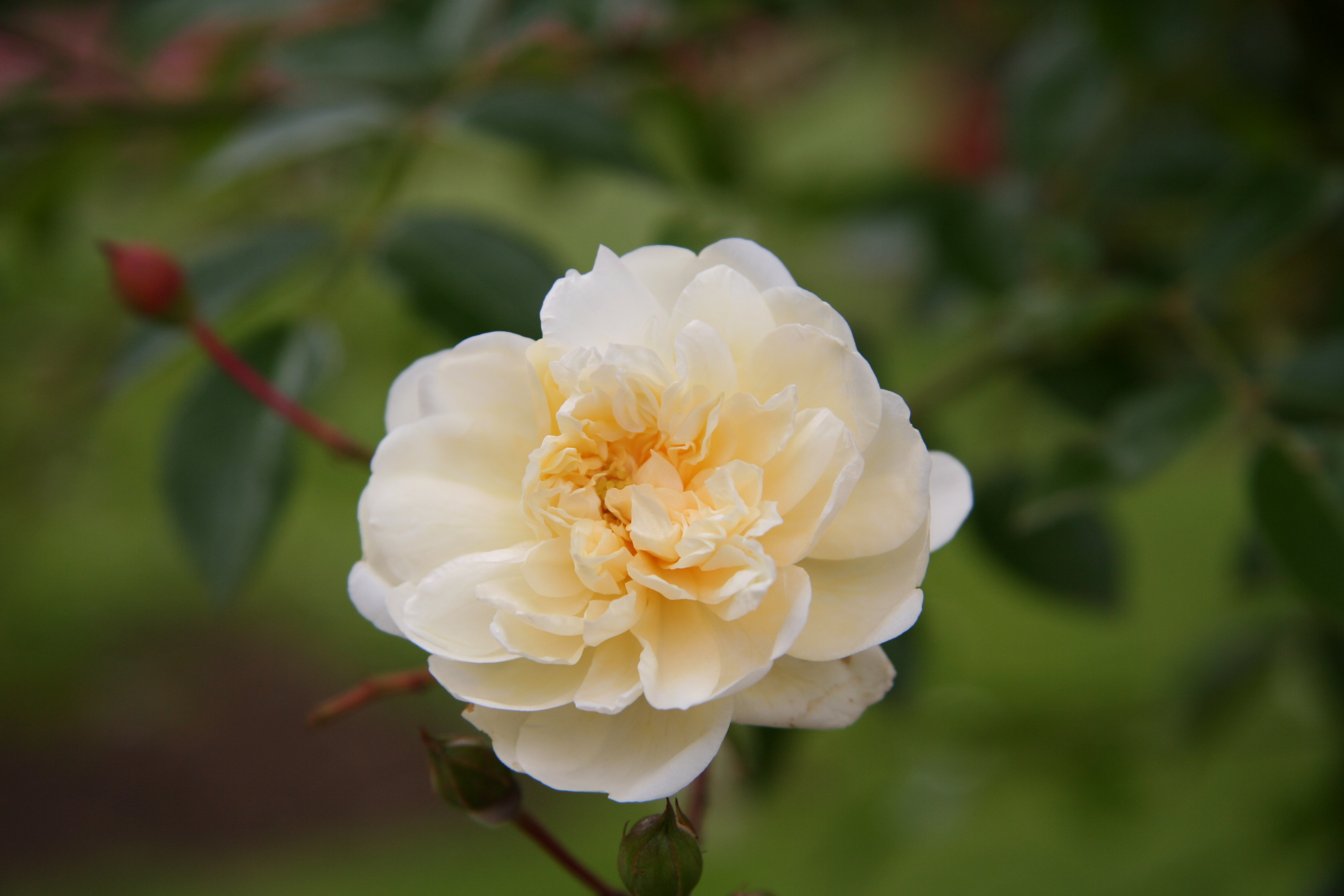
'Alberic Barbier', 1900

The Barbier nursery was founded by Albert Barbier (1845 -1931) and his brother, Eugène, in Olivet, a village near Orleans, France. Albert was a nurseryman. He initially worked at the Transon brothers nursery and the D. Dauvesse nursery in Orleans with fellow nurseryman, Paul Transon, as his partner. Barbier took over the management of Transon nurseries in 1872, before starting his own nursery with his brother Eugène in 1894. The Barbier family business initially sold fruit trees, but later began breeding and selling roses. Albert's sons, René (1870-1931), Léon (b 1878), and Georges later joined the company.

The Barbiers introduced the hybrid Wichurana rose to Europe in the early 1900s. Between 1900 and 1930, René Barbier produced exceptional new rose cultivars, large-flowered rambling roses with strongly scented and beautifully shaped flowers. Barbier developed this new rose variety by crossing Rosa 'lucieae', (a vigorous, trailing species from Japan known for its thick purplish-red canes and glossy, dark green, foliage), and hybrid tea roses.

During the height of rose production, the Barbier nursery produced some of the most popular and best selling roses at the time, including 'Albertine', 'Alexandre Girault', and 'François Juranville'. The Barbiers roses produced more flowers but were less hardy than ramblers produced from Hybrid Perpetual stock parents. Later ramblers produced by the nursery were more robust. Hardier ramblers like 'Primevère' (1929) and 'Jacotte' (1920) were popular in colder climates, like the New England region of the United States.

The Barbier nursery also introduced the first Wichurana Polyantha rose, 'Renoncule' in 1911. After eighty years in business, The Barbier nursery closed in 1972. There are 33 Barbier rose cultivars that exist today, all introduced between 1900 and 1930. A large collection of Barbier roses grow in the Roseraie du Val-de-Marne gardens near Paris, France.

=== Rosa 'Primevère' ===
The rose cultivar was bred by René Barbier in 1929 by crossing Rosa lucieae and the yellow hybrid tea rose, 'Constance' (Pernet-Ducher, 1915). It is thought to be the best yellow large-flowered Wichurana rambler.
