= Roseraie du Val-de-Marne =

Rose garden in L'Haÿ-les-Roses, Val-de-Marne, France

Coordinates: 48°46′34.80″N 2°20′05.20″E

Roseraie du Val-de-Marne or Roseraie de L'Haÿ is a rose garden in L'Haÿ-les-Roses, Val-de-Marne, France.

== History ==
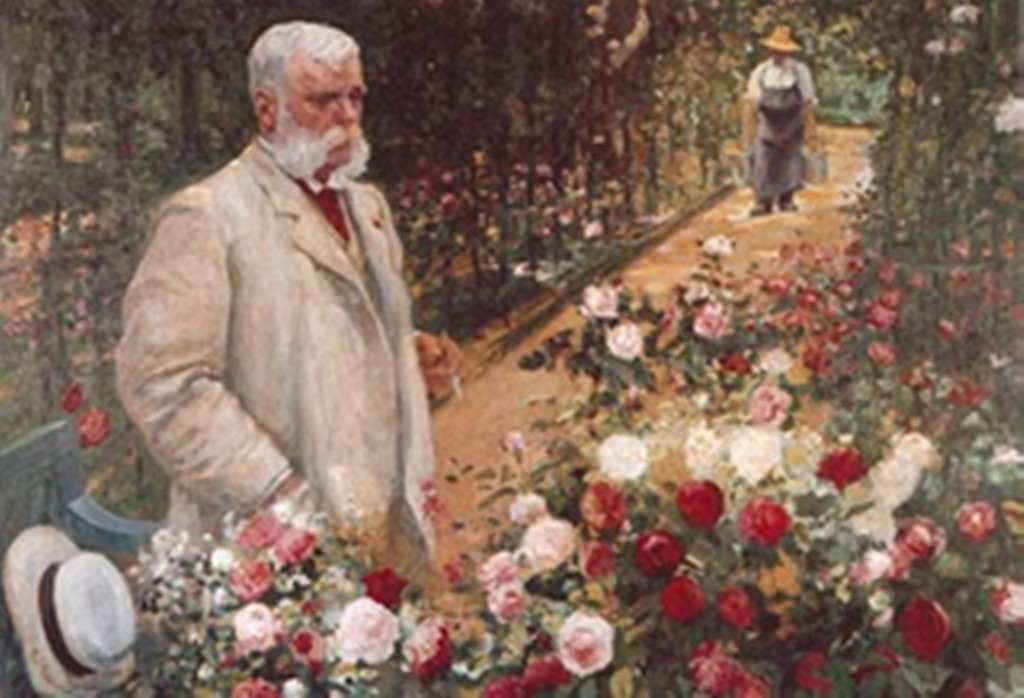
Jules Gravereaux in his rose garden in 1900

Jules Gravereaux, who made his fortune in the Bon Marché department store in Paris, purchased a large property in L'Haÿ about 8 km south of Paris in 1892 and hired the famous landscape architect and horticulturalist Édouard André to lay out a garden containing 1600 roses. The garden claims to be the first ever garden dedicated exclusively to roses.

Gravereaux collected roses from all over Europe and started to create new rose varieties for the production of rose oil for perfume, which would facilitate the process of distillation. He worked on hybrids of Rosa rugosa and developed the cultivar 'Rose à parfum de L'Haÿ', among others. In all he created 27 new cultivars, primarily for rose oil production. The very fragrant, crimson-purple rugosa hybrid 'Roseraie de L'Haÿ', was named for this garden.

Roseraie de L'Haÿ reached peak capacity at 8000 roses in 1910, every type known at the time.

In May 1914 the name of the town of L'Haÿ became officially L'Haÿ-les-Roses (meaning "L'Haÿ the roses") in honour of the renowned rose garden.

Laid out in thirteen formal sections, today Roseraie du Val-de-Marne has a total of 13,100 rose bushes featuring 3200 species and varieties. The garden has modern French and foreign roses on one side, the formal rose garden with a reflecting pool in the center, and the old garden roses and classic roses on the other side.

The site has been judged a historic monument. The pavilions are protected.

In the year 2000, the L'Haÿ-les-Roses public park Roseraie de L'Haÿ was commemorated with a marker as part of the official Méridienne verte (Green Meridian). This line is a continuation of the Paris meridian as mentioned in the Dan Brown book The Da Vinci Code. This meridian has also been referred to as the Serpent Rouge passing through the Church of Saint-Sulpice, Paris and as the Rose Line.

== Roses which have their origin in this garden ==
- Rosa rugosa var. "Amélie Gravereaux" (1903)
- Rosa rugosa var. "Roseraie de L'Haÿ" (1901)
- Rosa var. "Mme Jules Gravereaux", Climbing Tea Rose (1901)

A tea rose bred by Joaquim Fontes in Brazil is named Rhodologue Jules Graveraux

== Location ==
About 8 km south of Paris, the rosary is located on Rue Albert Watel in L'Haÿ-les-Roses, Val-de-Marne, France.

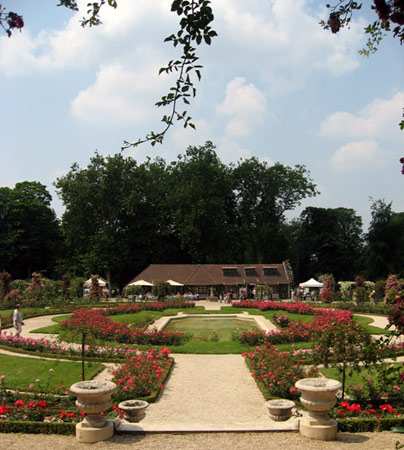
Norman pavilion

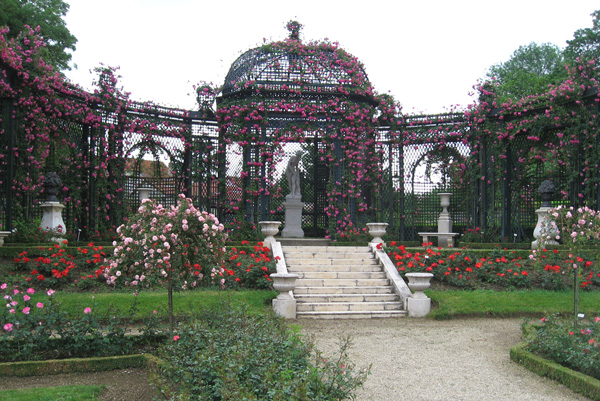
Dome

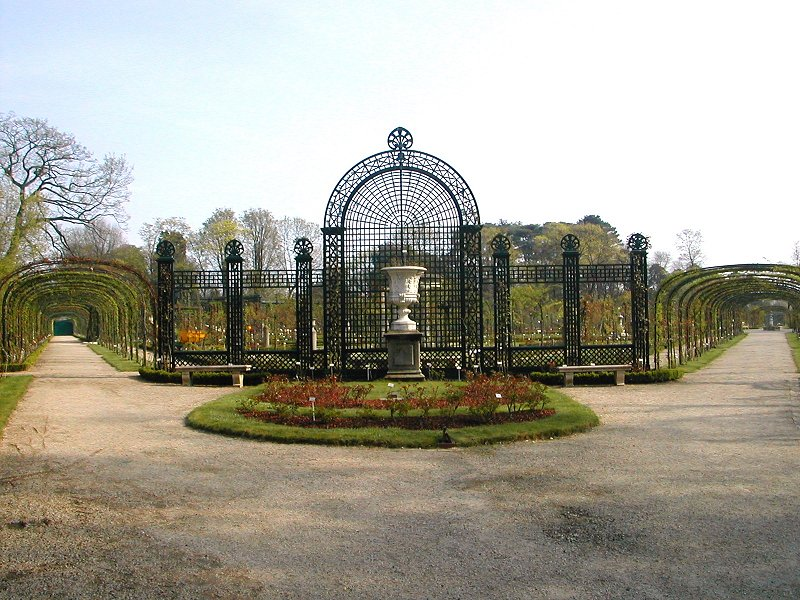
View of the rosarium
