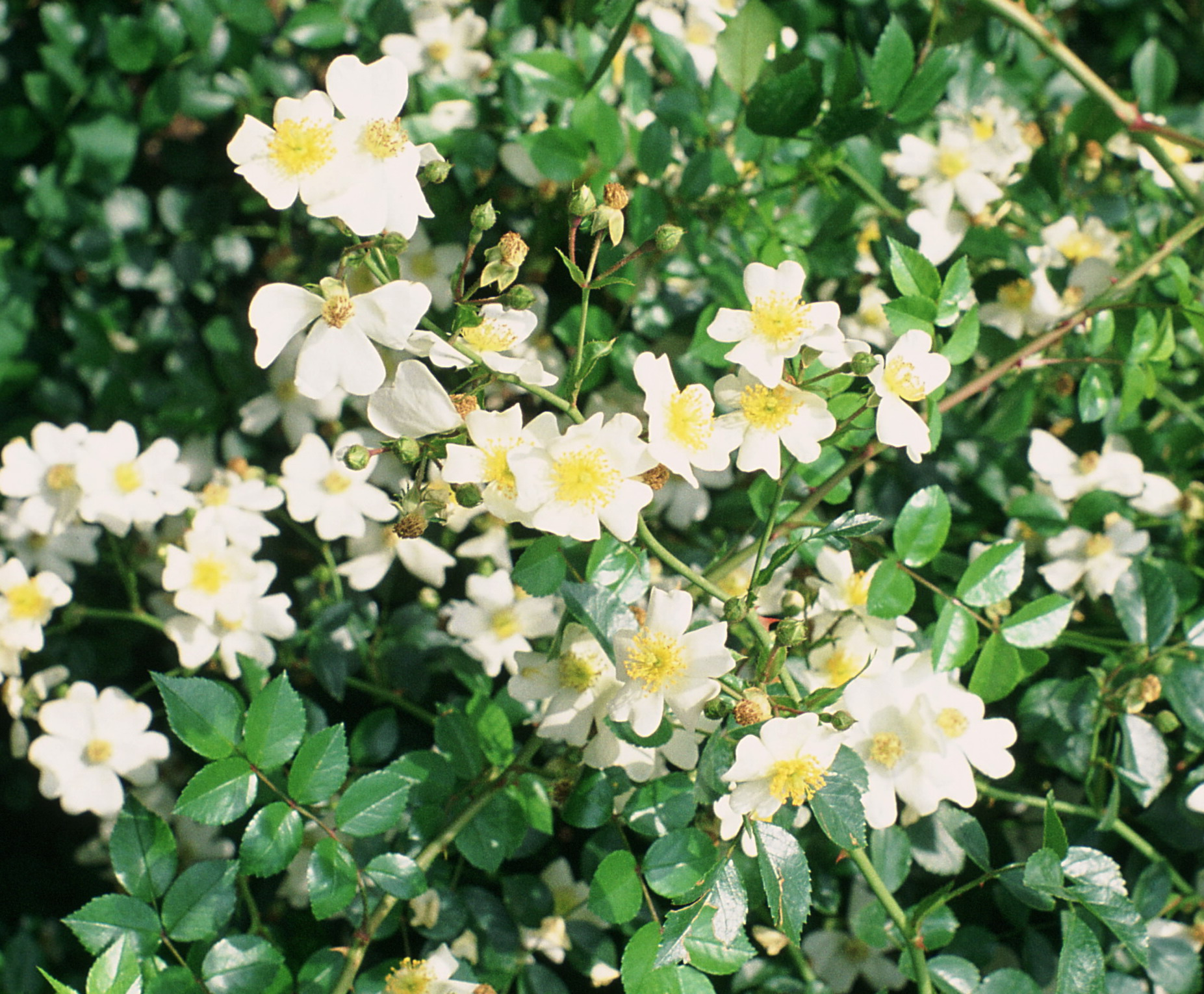

Scientific classification
- Kingdom: Plantae
- Clade: Embryophytes
- Clade: Tracheophytes
- Clade: Spermatophytes
- Clade: Angiosperms
- Clade: Eudicots
- Clade: Rosids
- Order: Rosales
- Family: Rosaceae
- Genus: Rosa
- Species: R. lucieae

Binomial name
- Rosa lucieae Franch. & Rochebr. ex Crép.

Synonyms
- Rosa lucieae var. euluciae Koidz. Rosa lucieae var. genuina Franch. & Sav.

= Rosa lucieae =

Species of plant

Rosa lucieae (syn. Rosa wichuraiana), the memorial rose, is a species of rose native to eastern Asia.

== Description ==
It is a woody, semi-evergreen shrub, with long trailing thorny branches of glossy green leaves, and single five-petalled white flowers with prominent yellow stamens in Summer; followed by small dark red hips. It can grow to 6 m (20 ft). It is named after the German botanist Max Ernst Wichura (1817–1866), with the suffix -iana.

== Uses ==
While it is valued as a garden plant in its own right, R. lucieae is also a parent of several rose hybrids, notably 'Dorothy Perkins', 'Albéric Barbier', 'New Dawn' and 'Albertine'. Its vigorous, rambling habit makes it particularly suitable for forming an impenetrable barrier at ground level, or for scrambling up large trees. It has been introduced to the United States.

== Gallery ==
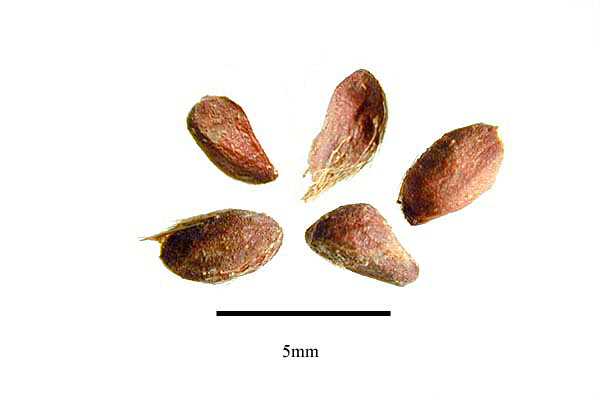
Seeds

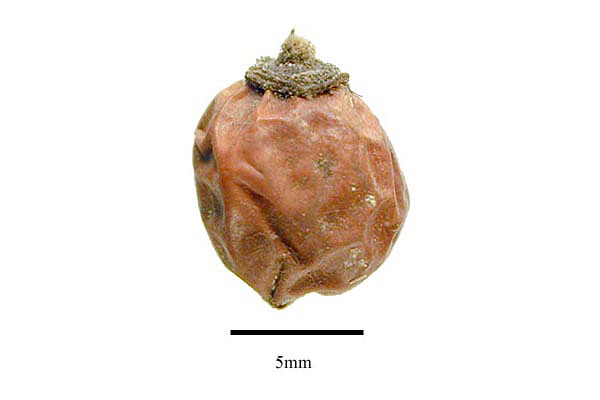
Fruit

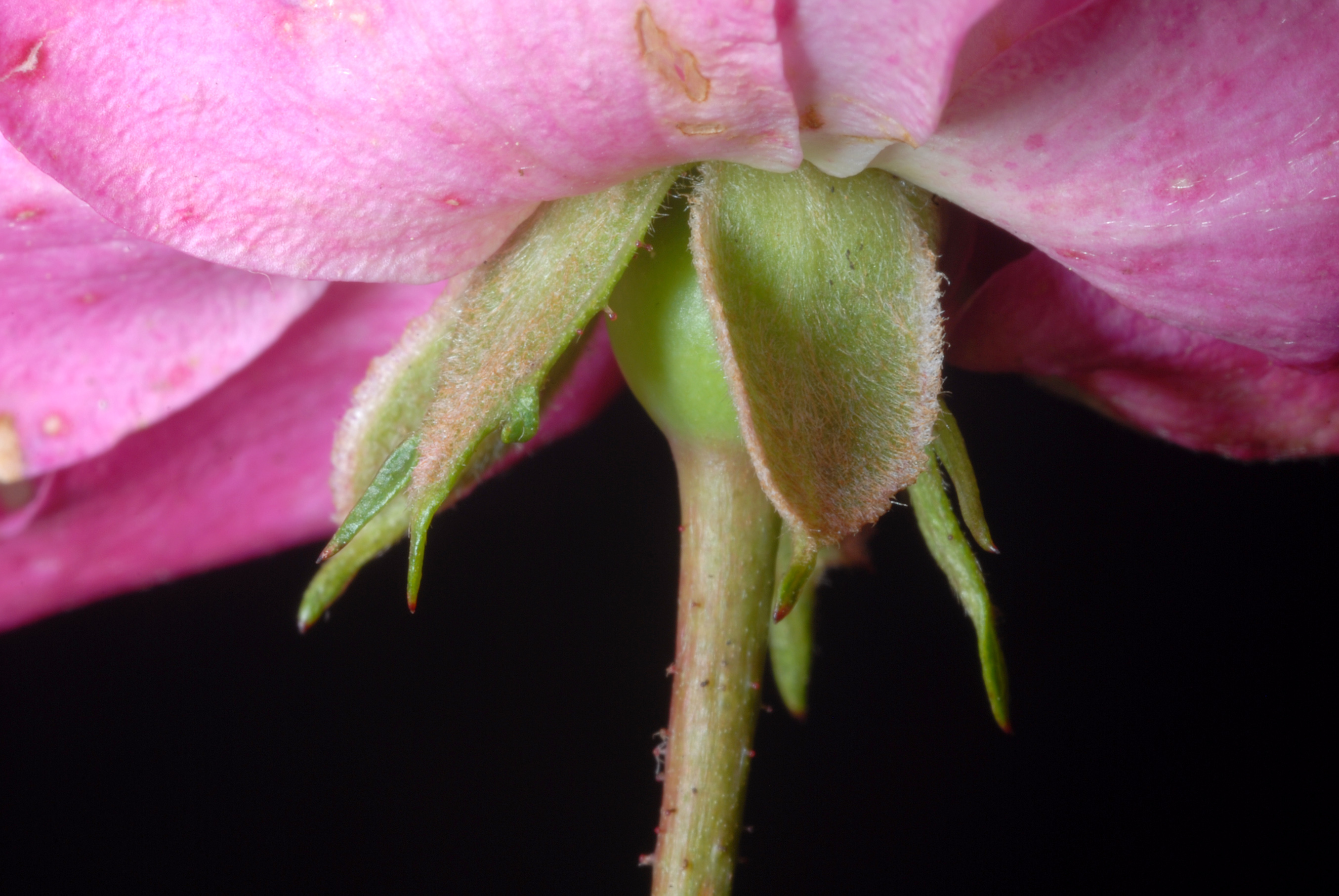
Sepals
