= Rosa 'Souvenir de la Malmaison' =

Rose cultivar

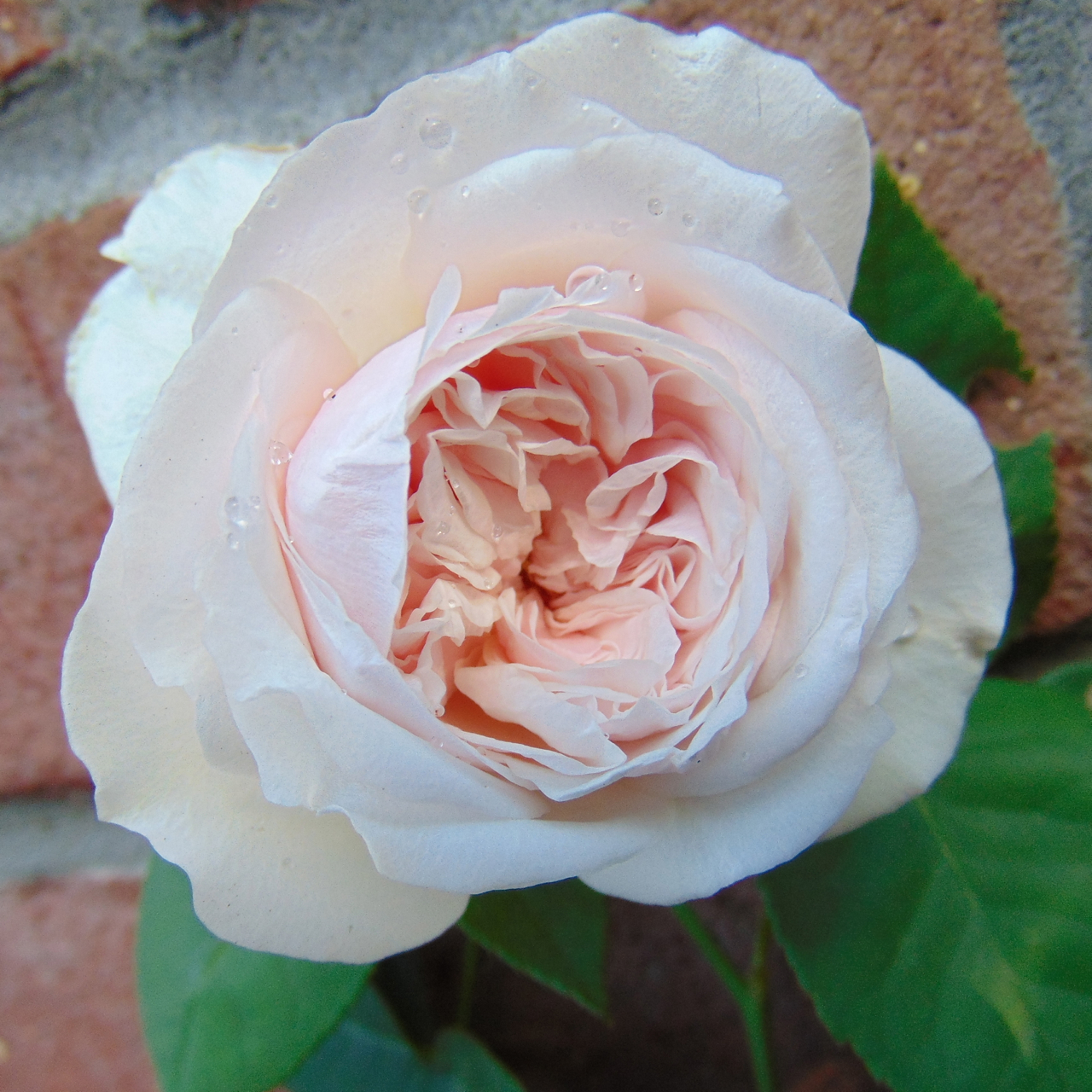
- Genus: Rosa hybrid
- Hybrid parentage: 'Mme Desprez' × a tea rose
- Cultivar group: Bourbon
- Cultivar: 'Souvenir de la Malmaison'
- Marketing names: Queen Of Beauty And Fragrance
- Origin: Béluze, 1843

Rosa 'Souvenir de la Malmaison' is a rose cultivar with large, very pale pink flowers that open flat. The Bourbon rose was created in 1843 by Lyon rose breeder Jean Béluze, who named it after the Château de Malmaison, where Joséphine de Beauharnais (1763–1814) had created a magnificent rose garden. It is probably a cross between 'Mme Desprez' and 'Devoniensis'.

The flowers are quartered and very filled and appear in clusters. They have a moderately strong tea-rose fragrance. Because the flowers are quite solid, they may rot in damp weather.

'Souvenir de la Malmaison' has few thorns and grows to between 1 and 2 metres (3.3 and 6.6 ft) high and about 1 meter (3.3 feet) wide. The light green leaves are large and glossy. The plant has a reputation for lack of winter hardiness (USDA zone 6) and for responding poorly to pruning. In colder, rainier climates, the cultivar can be susceptible to mildew and black spot.

== Rose Hall of Fame ==
In 1988, 'Souvenir de la Malmaison' was added to the Old Rose Hall of Fame by the World Federation of Rose Societies.

== Sports and hybrid offspring ==
There are five known extant sports: the climber 'Climbing Souvenir de la Malmaison' (Bennett, 1893), the pink form 'Capitaine Dyel de Graville' (Boutigne, 1905), a lighter pink sport with scooped petals 'Mme Cornelissen' (Cornelissen, pre-1864) the white sport 'Kronprinzessin Viktoria' (Volvert, 1887), named after the oldest daughter (1840–1901) of Queen Victoria, and 'Souvenir de St Anne's (Hilling, 1950), a semi-double white rose with yellow stamens that had originated in a garden at St Anne's, Clontarf, Dublin.

One of the most famous descendants of 'Souvenir de la Malmaison' is 'Gloire de Dijon' (Jacotot, 1850).
