= Pierre Humbert =

Pierre Humbert may refer to:

- Pierre Humbert (architect) (1848–?), French architect
- Pierre Humbert (mathematician) (1891–1953), French mathematician
