= Jean Béluze =

French rose breeder

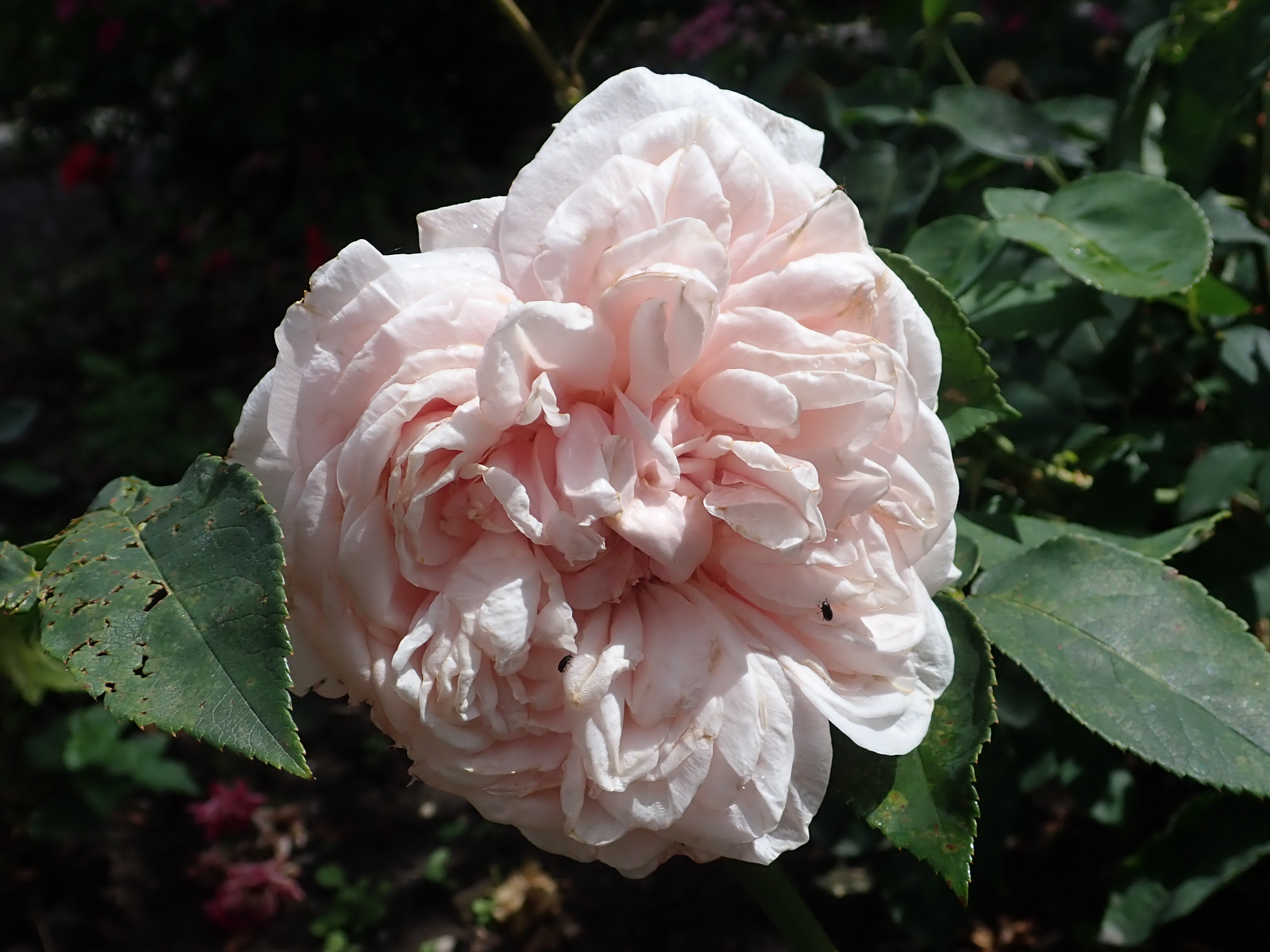
The famous Bourbon rose 'Souvenir de la Malmaison' (1843) by Jean Béluze

Jean Béluze (or Beluze; 10 August 1793 – 1869) was a French rose breeder.

He was, along with Jacques Plantier and Jean-Baptiste Guillot, one of the first rose breeders in Lyon. Little is known about his life.

His horticultural establishment was located in Vaise, a suburb of Lyon, on Sentier de la Duchère (route de Bourgogne). Between 1839 and 1860, he bred approximately 50 new rose varieties, mainly China Roses (or Bengal Roses), Bourbon Roses, and Tea Roses.

His greatest and most enduring success is the Bourbon Rose 'Souvenir de la Malmaison', a pale to light pink variety named after the famous rose garden of Joséphine de Beauharnais at Malmaison. The variety was introduced in 1843 and remains one of the most famous and popular Old Roses to this day. It was awarded the title of World Rose in 1988.

Other well-known varieties by Béluze include the whitish Tea or China Rose 'Rival de Paestum' (1839), the light pink Bourbon Rose 'Reine des Vièrges' (1844), and the dark pink Bourbon Rose 'Leveson Gower' (1846), which is sometimes mistakenly thought to be a sport of 'Souvenir de la Malmaison'.

His later creations that have also survived include the purplish-pink Moss Rose 'Gloire d’Orient' (1855) and the pale yellow, heavily petaled Noisette Rose 'Madame Schultz' (1856).

Jean Béluze died in 1869 at around 76 years of age.

== Gallery: Roses by Jean Béluze ==
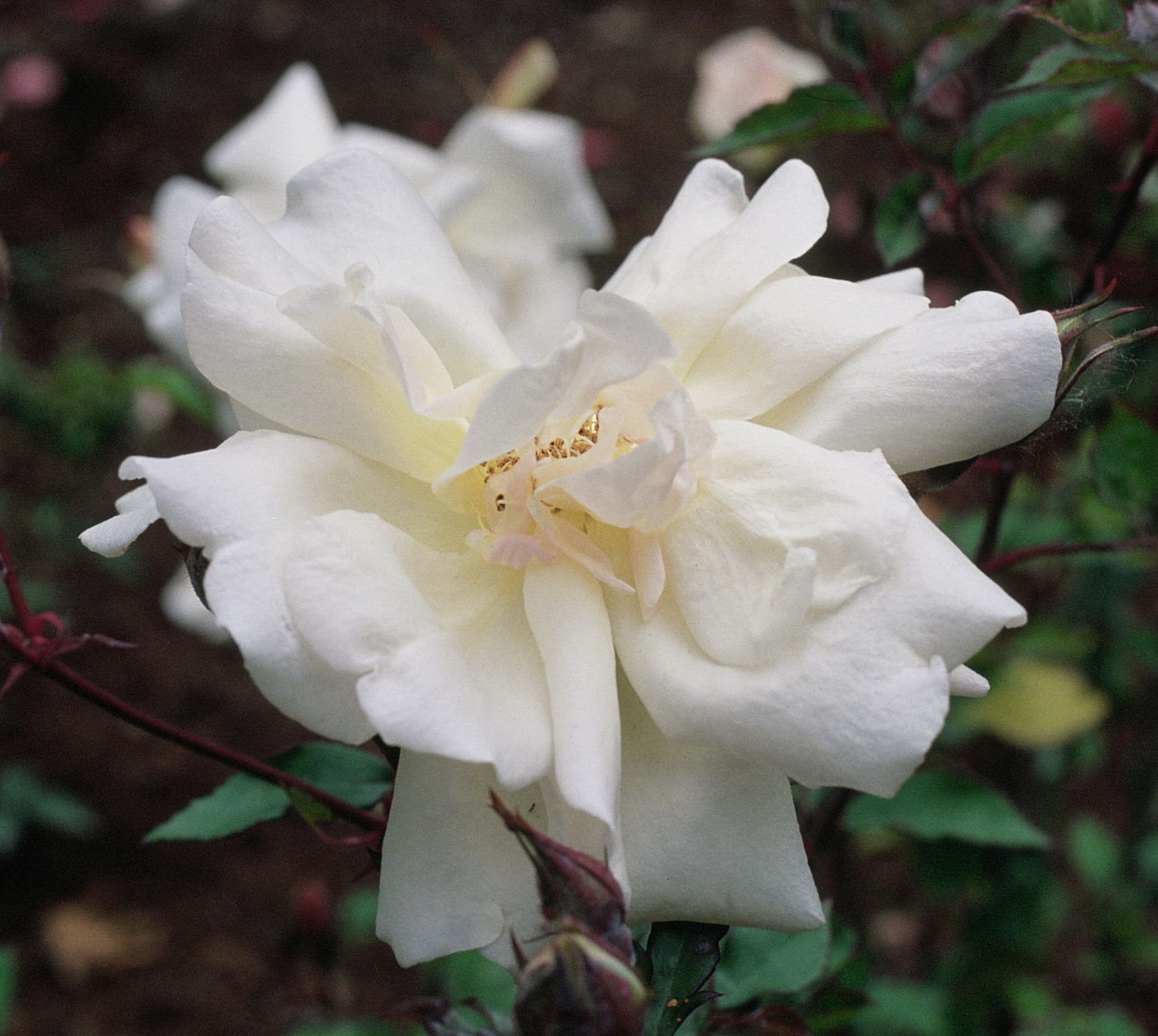
'Rival de Paestum', 1839

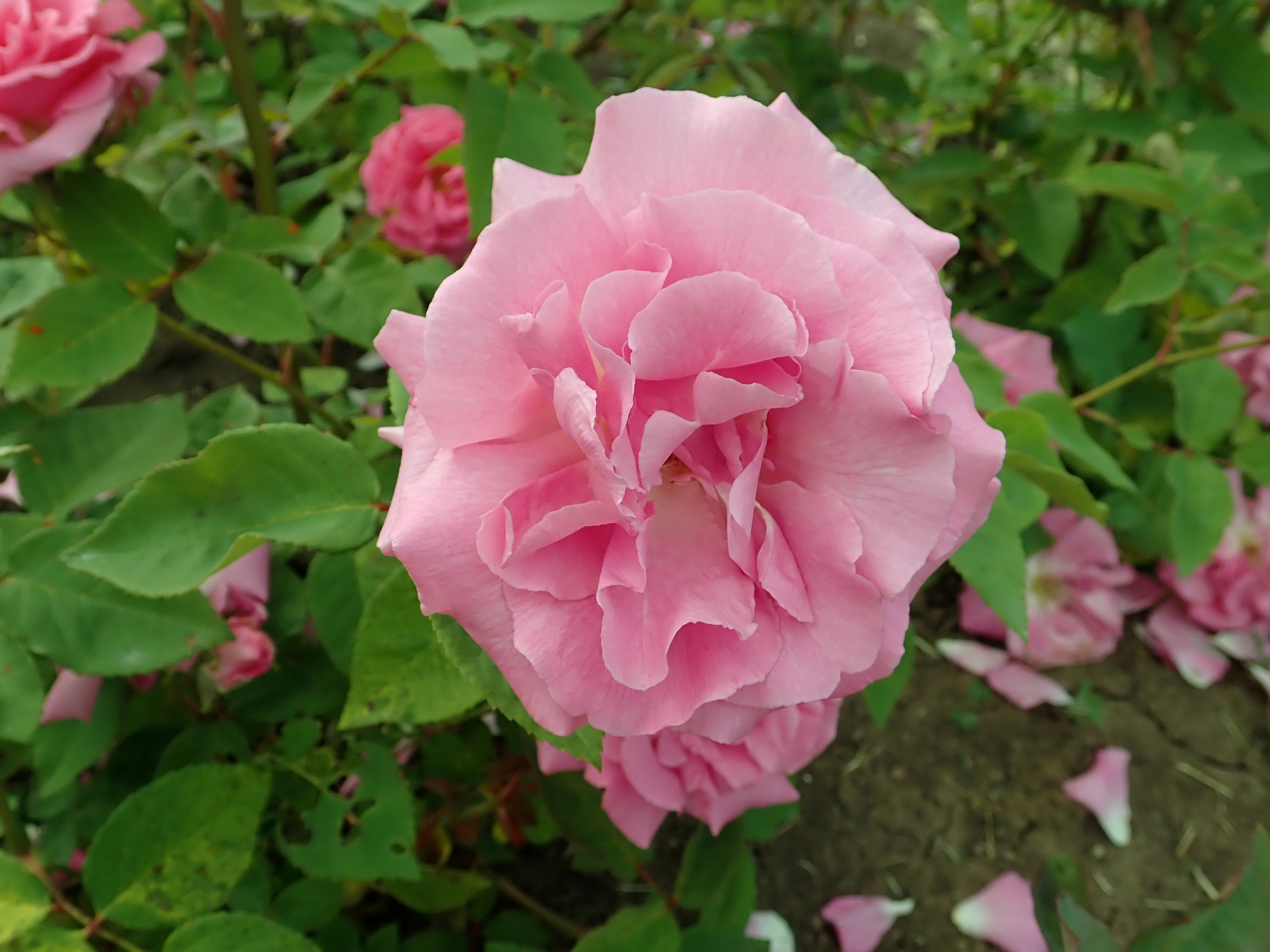
'Reine des Vièrges', 1844

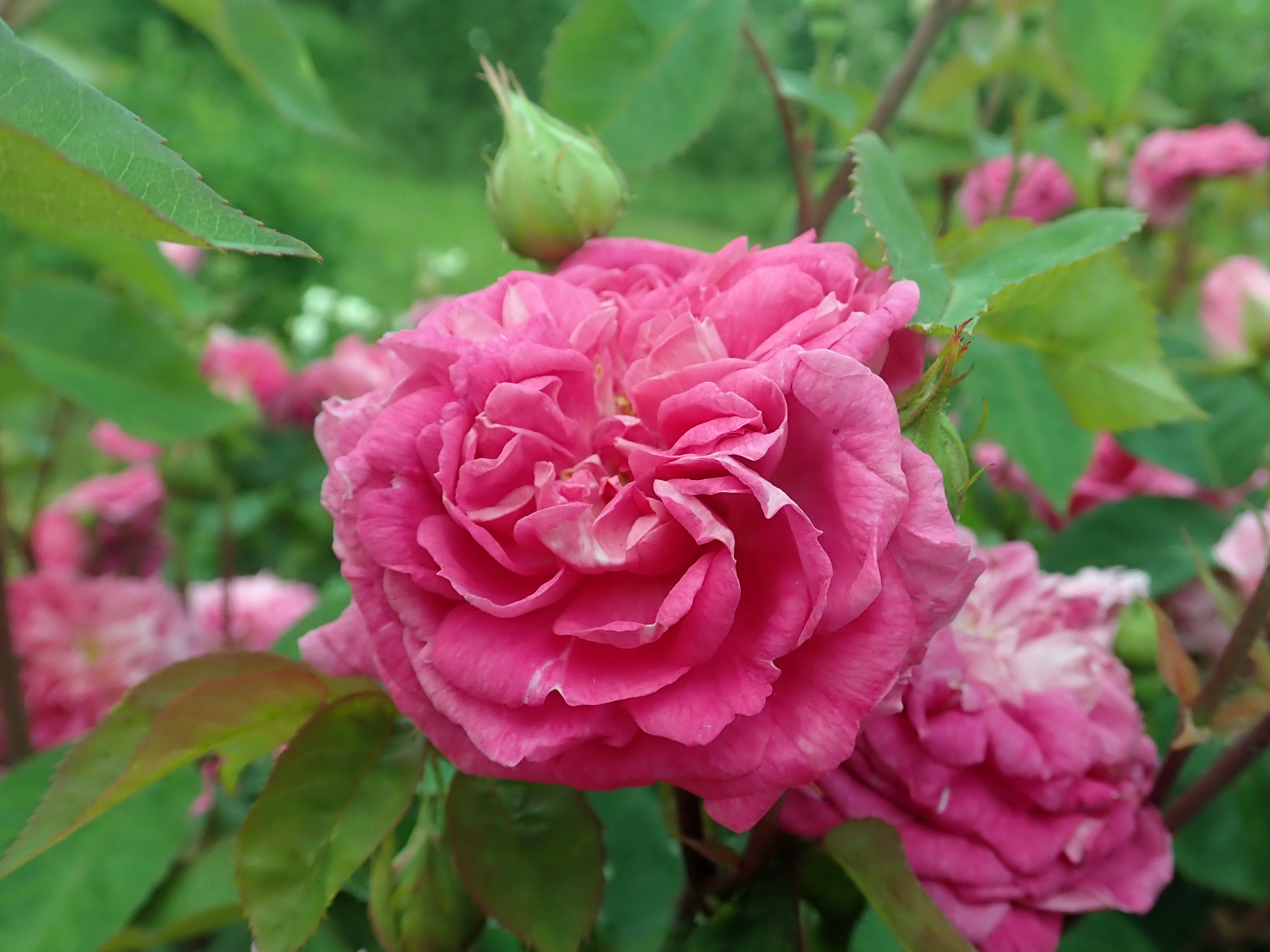
'Leveson Gower', 1846
