= Kappa Beta Pi =

Legal association

- ΚΒΠ
- Founded: December 15, 1908; 117 years ago Chicago-Kent College of Law
- Type: Professional
- Former affiliation: PFA; PPA
- Status: Defunct
- Defunct date: c. 2015
- Emphasis: Law
- Scope: International
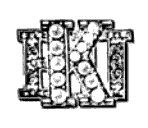
- Member badge
- Colors: Turquoise blue and Old gold
- Flower: Yellow Tea Rose
- Publication: Kappa Beta Pi Quarterly
- Chapters: 58
- Headquarters: Silver Spring, Maryland; United States

Kappa Beta Pi (ΚΒΠ) was an International Legal Association. It was established as the first professional law sorority at Chicago-Kent College of Law in 1908.

== History ==
Kappa Beta Pi was founded at Chicago-Kent College of Law in Chicago, Illinois on December 15, 1908. It was the first legal sorority and sought to encourage professional standards for women law students and lawyers. Its Founders were:

- Sue M. Brown
- Anna Marie Knabjohann Buck
- Katharine S. Clark
- Alice Craig Edgerton
- Claire L. Gleason
- Phyllis M. Kelley
- Alice A. Prince
- Nettie Rothblum
- Mary A. Sellers
- Charlotte Doolittle White

Edgerton was the first Grand Dean or president. The sorority was incorporated in Illinois on December 15, 1908. This date is celebrated by chapters as Founders' Day.

Starting in 1925, admission of new chapters was limited to American schools that met the requirements for membership in the Association of American Law Schools, or to schools on the approved list of the American Bar Association, along with those foreign law schools meeting equivalent requirements. In 1927, its first international chapter was formed, Omicron chapter, in Paris, France. This was later followed by chapters in London, England; West Germany; Shanghai, China; Puerto Rico; and several locations in Canada.

During the first half of the 20th century, the sorority published lists of law firms that would hire women and those that resisted. It also published catalogs of female judges and lawyers serving in the field.

At the 1973 convention, its name was changed to Kappa Beta Pi Legal Association International, and from this juncture, it was referred to as a legal association, not a sorority. At the May 1976 convention in Columbus, Ohio, all references restricting its membership to women were removed from its official documents.

Kappa Beta Pi was a chartering member of the Professional Panhellenic Association (PPA) and thus became a member of the Professional Fraternity Association (PFA) when the PPA merged with the Professional Interfraternity Association. Later, Kappa Beta Pi resigned from the PFA. The last known address for the association was either in Silver Spring, Maryland (per Baird's Manual) or in Omaha, Nebraska (Guidestar). As of November 2021, Guidestar reports "no activity for some time" and that the organization may be defunct.

== Symbols and traditions ==
The sorority's badge was a monogram with the Κ jeweled and superimposed over the letters Β and Π, which are embellished with scroll work. The pledge pin was an irregularly shaped shield enameled in Turquoise and old gold.

Its coat of arms places a field of turquoise blue in the upper left, while the lower right field is white. Devices, an open book, and scales were rendered in gold. A knight's helmet was shown proper, that is, in the natural color, shown full face with the visor open and is of steel with silver ornaments. The helmet symbolizes the protection of the law and inspires chivalrous conduct.

Kappa Beta Pi's colors were turquoise blue and old gold. Its flower was the Yellow Tea Rose. Its official song, "To Kappa Beta Pi" was written in 1941 by Alice Craig Edgerton.

Starting in 1916, the organization published a quarterly, called The Kappa Beta Pi Quarterly. It also published an annual called The Secret Bulletin. The sorority also published its fifty-year history which was written by Alice Craig Edgerton.
