= Henry Bennett (rose hybridizer) =

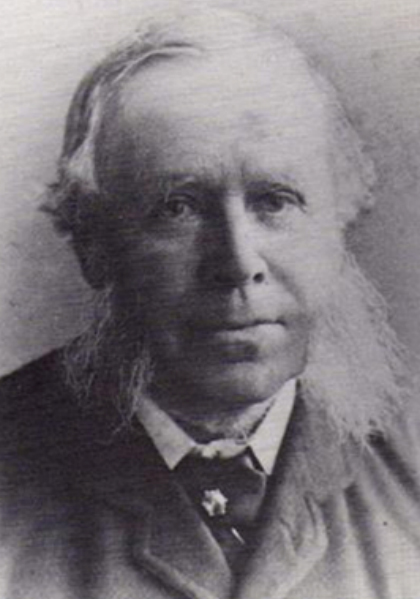
Henry Bennett (1823–1890), pioneer of deliberate hybridisation of roses

Henry Bennett (bapt. 3 August 1823 – 12 August 1890) was an English pioneer in the systematic, deliberate hybridisation of roses. Bennett, a tenant farmer from Stapleford in the Wylye Valley in Wiltshire, applied the systematic breeding used in raising cattle to roses, and emphasised that his roses were raised scientifically from known parents. His hybrids, between Teas and Hybrid Perpetuals, were called Pedigree Hybrids of the Tea Rose. He is considered the father of the Hybrid Tea class. Important cultivars are the Hybrid Tea 'Lady Mary Fitzwilliam' (1882), a parent of 'Mme. Caroline Testout' and the Hybrid Perpetuals 'Captain Hayward' (1893) and 'Mrs. John Laing' (1887).

== Biography ==
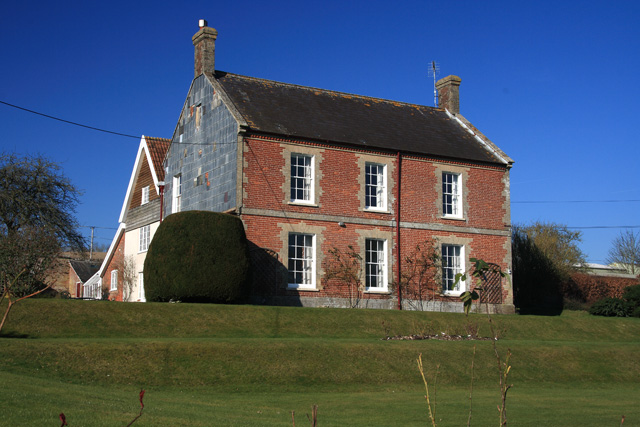
Manor Farmhouse, Stapleford, Wilts. The front range was built c. 1860, during Bennett's tenancy.

Henry Bennett was born in Codford, Wiltshire, to farmer John Bennett and his wife, Caroline Bennett. Henry was a cattle and wheat farmer at Manor Farm, Stapleford, Wiltshire in the mid-1800s. He married Emma Rebbeck in July 1852, and they had eight children.

Bennett decided that the future was not in cattle and wheat, but a new source of income was going to be necessary, and that would be roses. In 1865, he bought his first roses and planted them on the farm, to propagate for sale. His knowledge of cattle breeding suggested to him that he might be able to make great advances in rose cultivation by applying the same principles to rose breeding – that of using known parents, selected for the qualities desired in the progeny. His first efforts were unsuccessful, so from 1870 to 1872 he visited successful rose hybridizers in France.

In France, Bennett was surprised to find that the masters of rose hybridisation did not practice deliberate hybridisation through controlled pollination, but rather raised the seeds resulting from natural pollination, which meant that while the seed parent might be known, the pollen parent never was. He also saw that the cool and damp English climate did not provide enough summer heat to ripen rose hips.

On returning home he built a heated glass house, where he kept his parent rose plants in pots. This system allowed him to work nearly year-round with Tea roses, and gave him a much longer bloom season with the Hybrid Perpetuals. Where other British rose hybridizers worked primarily in summer, Bennett's system allowed him to begin cross-pollination in March. While developing his own roses, he introduced and sold roses acquired from other breeders.

Emma Bennett, an avid hunter, died in 1875 from a horse-riding accident. The two surviving daughters, Maria and Mary, then 16 and 11, took over running the household.

Bennett moved operations in 1880 from Stapleford to Shepperton in Middlesex. From then on, he was no longer a farmer, but a rose hybridizer who listed his occupation as florist. He travelled to the United States in 1888 to study rose growing there. He introduced some of his roses in that country before introducing them in the UK.

Bennett died from cirrhosis of the liver in 1890. His youngest son Edmund introduced the rose 'Captain Hayward' posthumously, in 1893.

== Contributions ==
Until the 19th century, rose hybridisation was a spontaneous occurrence, mediated by pollinating insects such as bees, or self-pollination. Deliberate, controlled pollination of roses to create new varieties was first systematically practised by Empress Josephine's horticulturalist, Andre Dupont, in the early 1800s. Still, controlled pollination was practised by very few people before Bennett began hybridising roses, inspired by his knowledge of cattle breeding. The laws of genetic inheritance were largely unknown at the time, as Gregor Mendel's pioneering work in genetics were not widely disseminated until the turn of the 20th century.

The National Rose Society was formed in 1876, largely a group of professional nurserymen and wealthy clergymen. New rose varieties were often introduced at its rose shows. Bennett showed some of his acquisitions in 1878, but did not show or introduce his own roses until 1879. At that time he introduced 10 roses, with named parentage, which he called Pedigree Hybrids of the Tea Rose. He was the first to publish and guarantee the parentage of his roses. He described these roses as having better repeat bloom, higher petal count, and being 'altogether different in type' compared to other roses. None of these roses are still in commerce, however.

One result of Bennett's Pedigree Roses introduction was a shakeup of the rose hybridising world. Other hybridizers rushed to copy Bennett's system, with controlled pollination and heated glass houses.

In 1880, Bennett was invited to a meeting of the Horticultural Society of Lyon, then a center of rose breeding and production. It was decided at this meeting that Bennett had created an entirely new class of roses, and that it would be called Hybrid Tea. Other rose growers followed suit, in the UK first by Paul & Son nursery in 1883, then Hugh Dickson of Belfast in 1884. The eminent British rosarian Joseph Pemberton dates the recognition of Hybrid Teas as a separate class at 1890, and credits the nursery Paul & Son with the first commercial offering of a Hybrid Tea in 1873, with 'Cheshunt Hybrid'. The National Rose Society in UK recognised the new class of Hybrid Tea in 1893. Of course, 'La France', introduced in 1872 by Jean-Baptiste André (fils) Guillot, is now generally considered to be the first Hybrid Tea, but was not recognised as a new kind of rose until after the new class was designated at this meeting in Lyon; it was classed as a Hybrid Perpetual when it was introduced. 'La France' also suffers from sterility, making it difficult to use in hybridising, while 'Lady Mary Fitzwilliam' is very fertile. The online database HelpMeFind Roses lists over 14,000 descendants for 'Lady Mary Fitzwilliam'.

In 1883, the National Rose Society introduced the gold medal, awarded to the most outstanding new rose introduced at one of its rose shows. Bennett won the first and second Gold Medals awarded, with 'Her Majesty' (Hybrid Perpetual) in 1883 and 'Mrs. John Laing' (Hybrid Perpetual) in 1885.

While few of Bennett's roses are still in cultivation, he is credited with developing an entirely new system of rose hybridisation, still used in the 21st century; an entirely new class of roses; and with creating rose cultivars that served as critical genetic material for future hybridizers. 'Lady Mary Fitzwilliam', in particular, is in the parentage of tens of thousands of modern hybrid tea roses, starting with Joseph Pernet-Ducher's 'Mme. Caroline Testout'. 'Mrs. John Laing', a pink Hybrid Perpetual, was described by the British horticulturalist Graham Stuart Thomas as "one of the most satisfying roses to grow and cut".

== Partial list of Bennett cultivars ==
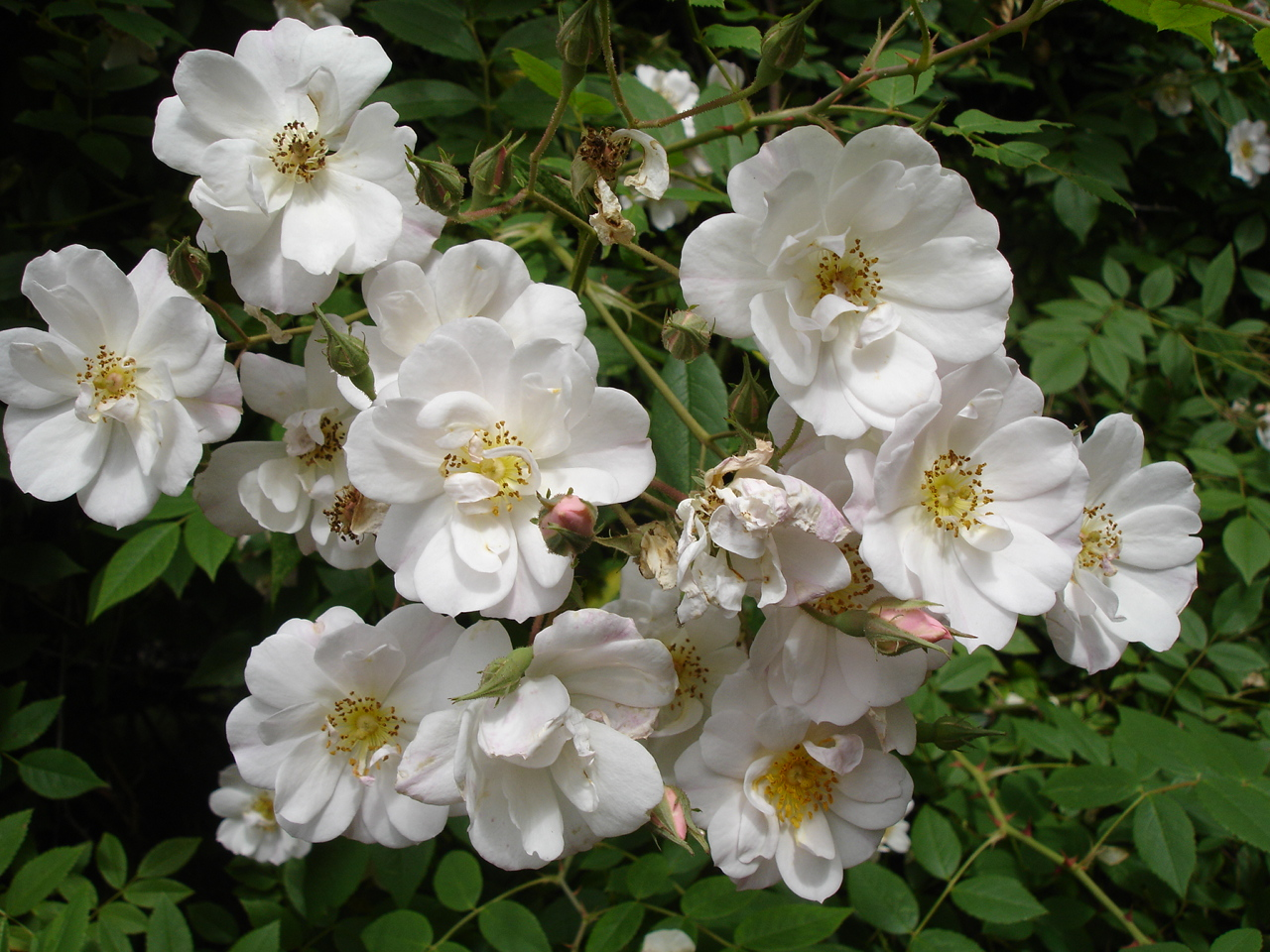
'Bennett's Seedling'

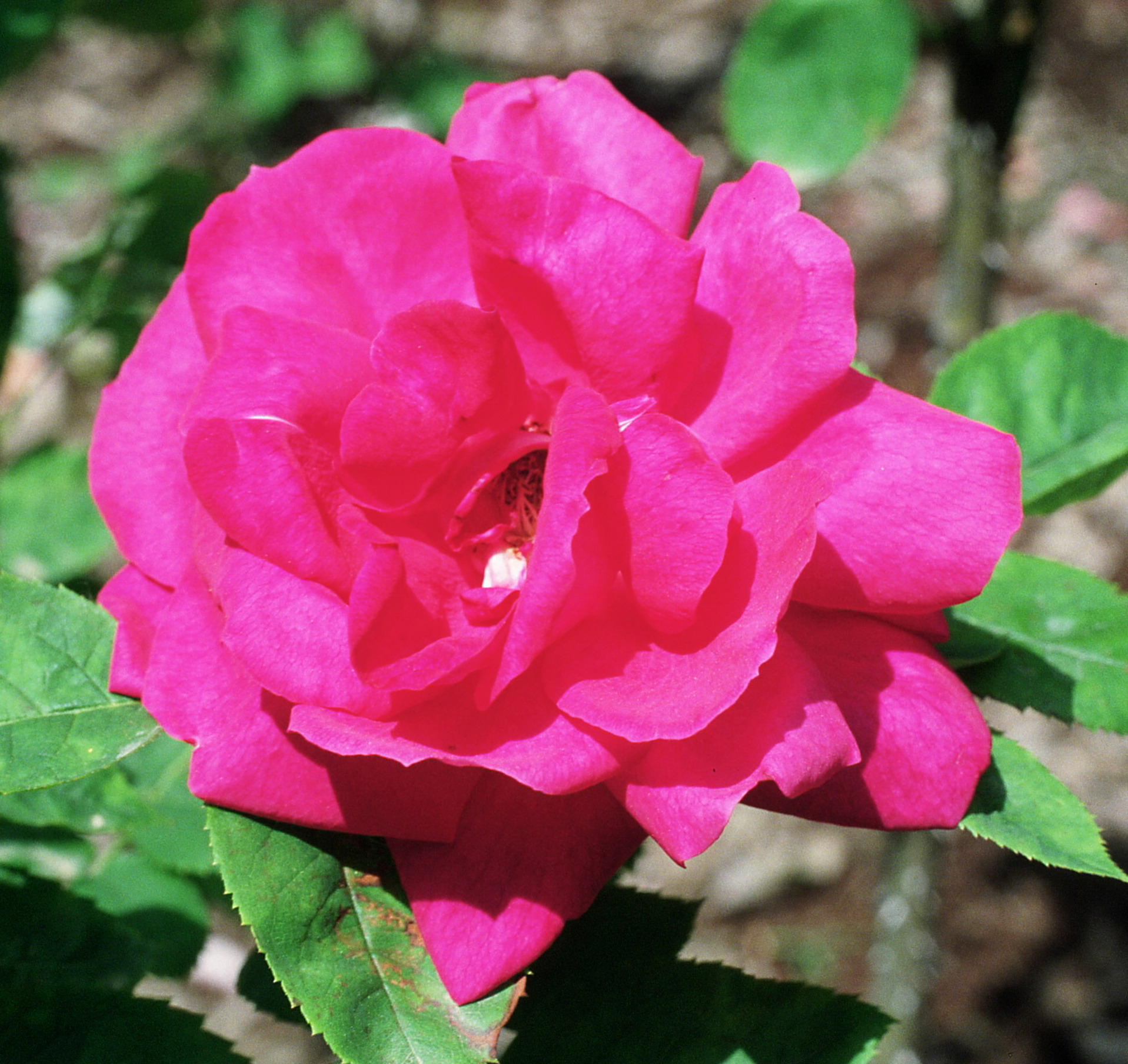
'Captain Hayward'

- 'Bennett's Seedling' (some time after he bought his first rose in 1865)
- 'Mme Welche' (1876)
- 'Cissie' (1879)
- 'Tiny Tears' (1879)
- 'Lady Mary Fitzwilliam' (1882)
- 'Folkestone' (1886)
- 'Her Majesty' (1883) (RNRS Gold Medal)
- 'Grace Darling' (1884)
- 'Mrs. John Laing' (1885) (RNRS Gold Medal)
- 'Viscountess Folkestone' (1886)
- 'Mrs John Laing' (1887)
- 'Captain Hayward' (1893)
- 'Climbing Souvenir de la Malmaison' (1893)
