= Pierre Humbert (architect) =

French architect

- Born: Pierre Humbert; 13 April 1848; Uckange
- Died: 18 October 1919 (aged 71); 7th arrondissement of Paris
- Occupation: Architect

Pierre Humbert (1848–1919) was a French architect.

== Works ==
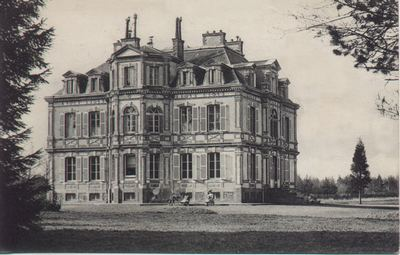
Château du Hallier, his residence in Eure-et-Loir.

Humbert was born in Uckange to a noble family.

He built many buildings and "hôtels particuliers" (private homes) in Paris and other European cities, such as Brussels for the aristocracy and the upper class of the time, such the prince of Caraman-Chimay, the duke des Cars or the Schneider family.

He especially built many buildings in the Champs-Elysées area and in the 16th arrondissement of Paris.

He is the father of the French architect Maurice Humbert, with whom he restored many castles, including Napoléon's Château de Malmaison.

== See also ==
Place des États-Unis

== Sources ==
- Françoise Talon, « Les palaces », in Les Champs-Élysées et leur quartier, Paris, 1988, p. 88,
- Monique Eleb, Anne Debarre "Architecture de la vie privée Paris 1880-1914 "
- Anne Debarre-Blanchard "L'Invention de l'habitation moderne, Paris, 1880-1914"
