= Château de Malmaison =

Coordinates: 48°52′15″N 2°10′01″E

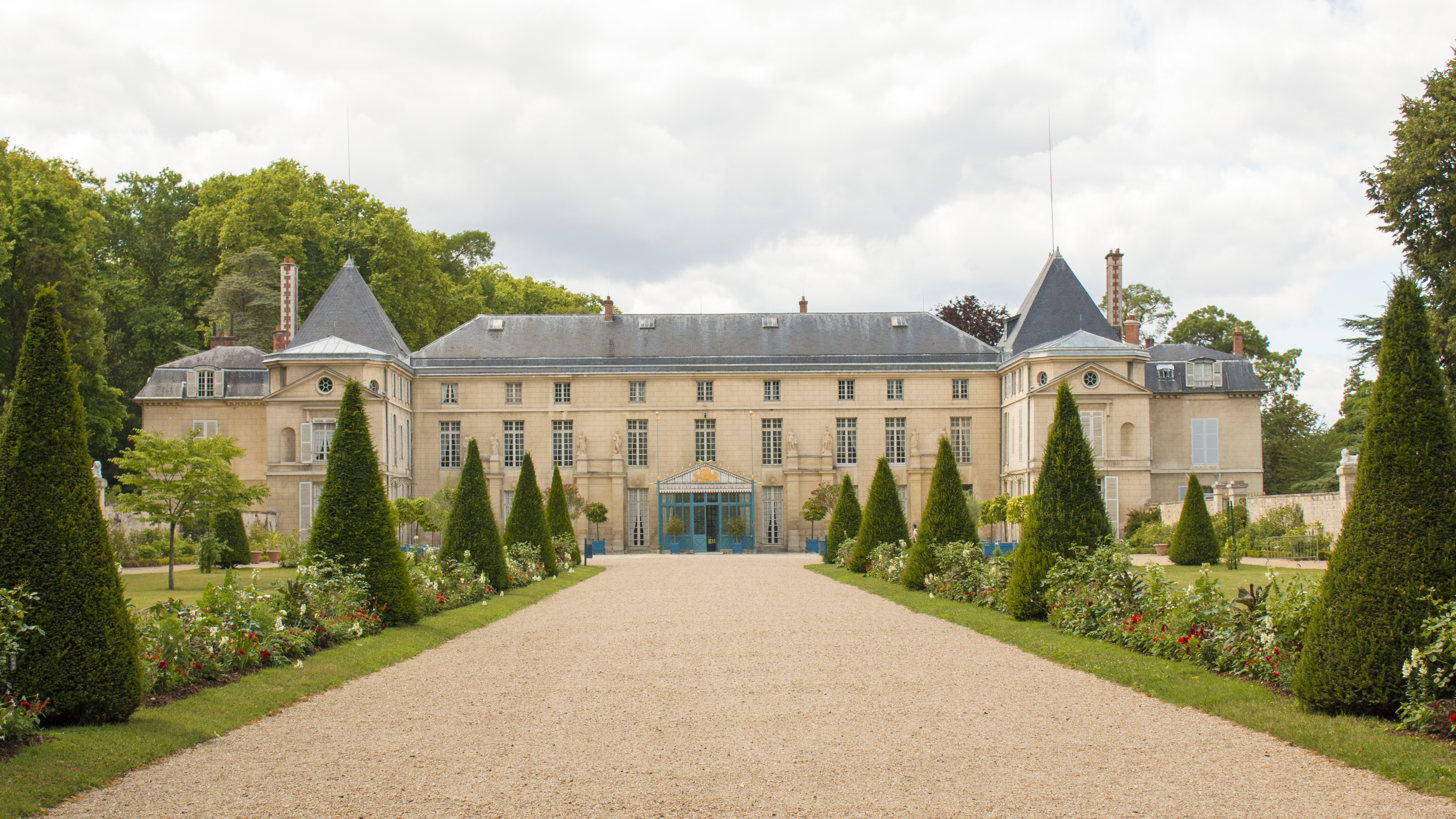
- Interactive map of the Château de Malmaison area

General information
- Type: Château
- Architectural style: Renaissance, Empire
- Location: Rueil-Malmaison, France

The Château de Malmaison (French pronunciation: [ʃɑto d(ə) malmɛzɔ̃]) is a French château situated near the left bank of the Seine, about 15 kilometres (9.3 mi) west of the centre of Paris, in the commune of Rueil-Malmaison.

Formerly the residence of Empress Joséphine de Beauharnais, along with the Tuileries, it was the headquarters of the French government from 1800 to 1802, and Napoleon's last residence in France at the end of the Hundred Days in 1815.

== History ==
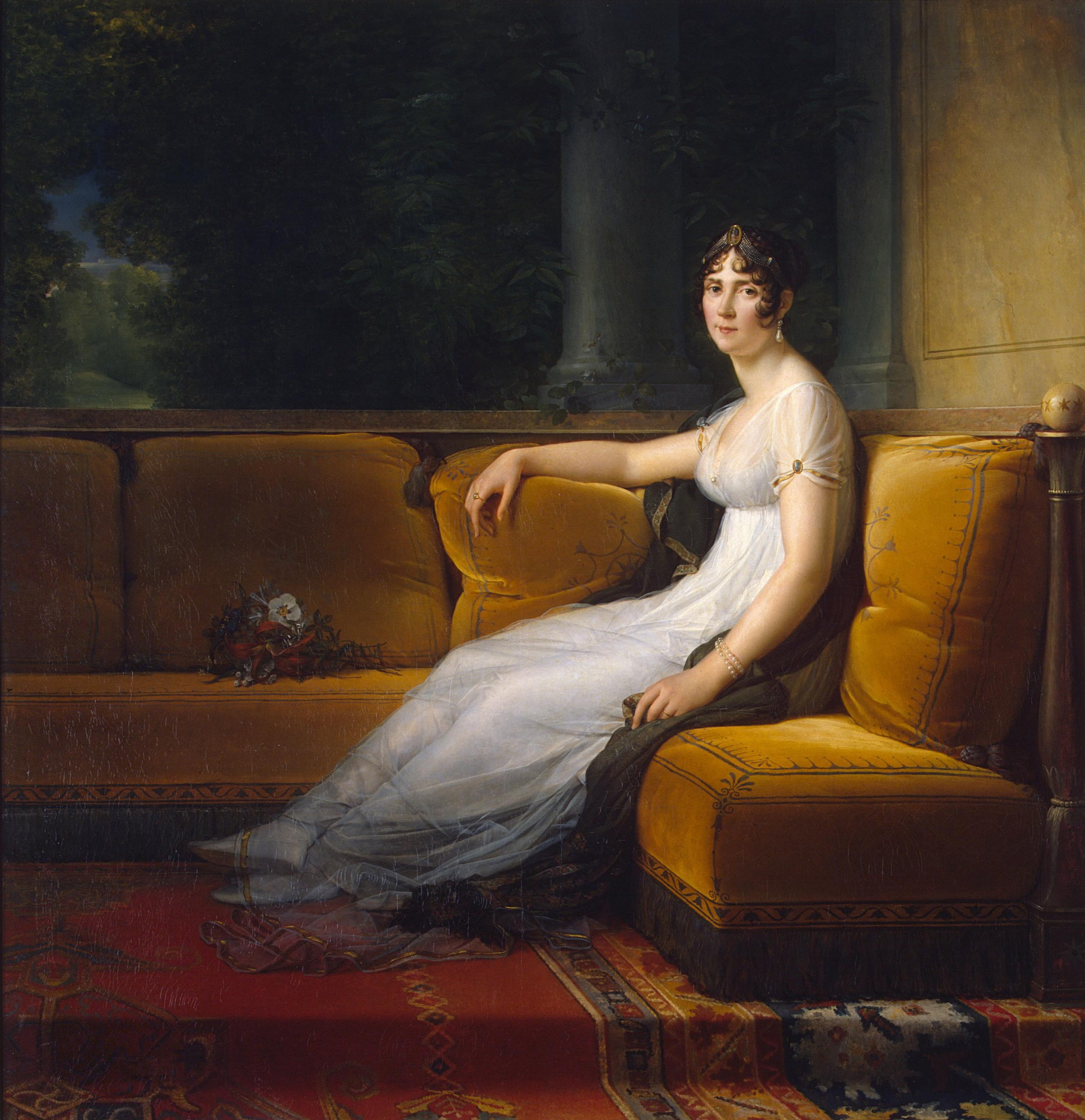
Joséphine de Beauharnais at Malmaison in 1801 by François Gérard

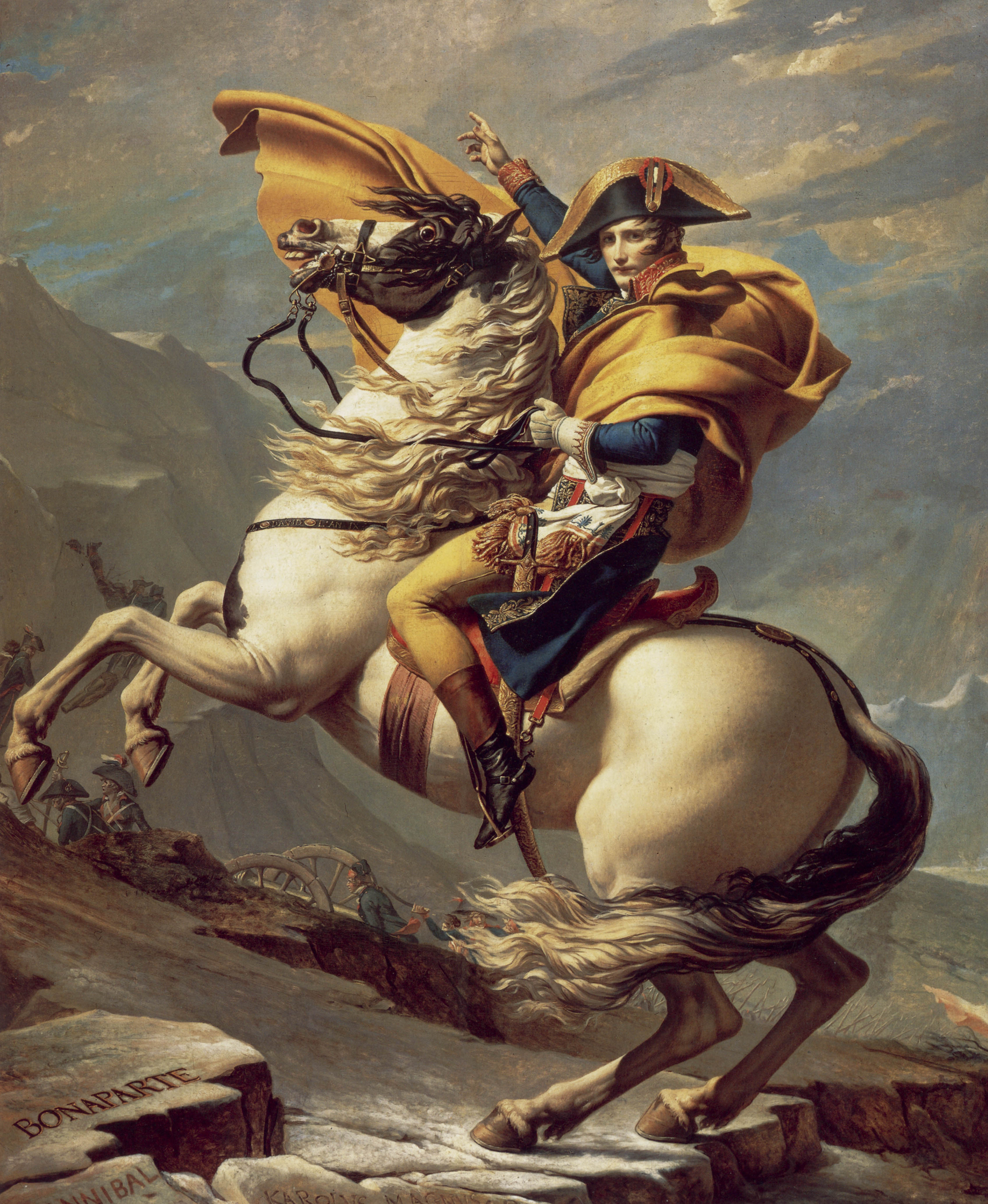
Napoleon Crossing the Alps, a painting by Jacques-Louis David from the Malmaison collection

Joséphine de Beauharnais bought the manor house in April 1799 for herself and her husband, General Napoleon Bonaparte, the future Napoleon I of France, at that time away fighting the Egyptian Campaign. Malmaison was a run-down estate, seven miles (11 km) west of central Paris that encompassed nearly 150 acres (0.61 km^{2}) of woods and meadows.

Upon his return, Bonaparte expressed fury at Joséphine for purchasing such an expensive house with the money she had expected him to bring back from the Egyptian campaign. The house, for which she had paid well over 300,000 francs, needed extensive renovations; she spent a fortune doing them. However, Malmaison would bring great happiness to the Bonapartes. Joséphine's daughter, Hortense de Beauharnais would call it "a delicious spot".

Joséphine endeavored to transform the large estate into "the most beautiful and curious garden in Europe, a model of good cultivation". She located rare and exotic plants and animals to enhance the gardens. Joséphine wrote: "I wish that Malmaison may soon become the source of riches for all [of France]." In 1800, she built a heated orangery large enough for 300 pineapple plants. Five years later, she ordered the building of a greenhouse, heated by a dozen coal-burning stoves. From 1803 until her death in 1814, Josephine cultivated nearly 200 new plants in France for the first time.

The property achieved enduring fame for its rose garden. Empress Joséphine had the Belgian artist Pierre-Joseph Redouté (1759–1840) record her roses (and lilies), and prints of these works sell quite well, even today. She created an extensive collection of roses, gathering plants from her native Martinique and from other places around the world. She grew some 250 varieties of roses. From the foreword to Jardin de la Malmaison (1803):

You have gathered around you the rarest plants growing on French soil...as we inspect them in the beautiful gardens of Malmaison, an impressive reminder of the conquests of your illustrious husband.

Birds and animals of all sorts began to enrich her garden, where they were allowed to roam free among the grounds. At the height of her days at Malmaison, Joséphine had the company of kangaroos, emus, black swans, zebras, sheep, gazelles, ostriches, chamois, a seal, antelopes and llamas to name a few. Some were from the Baudin expedition.

After her divorce from Napoléon, Joséphine received Malmaison in her own right, along with a pension of 5 million francs a year, and remained there until her death in 1814. Napoléon returned and took residence in the house after his defeat at the Battle of Waterloo (1815), before his exile to the island of Saint Helena. After Josephine's death in 1814, the house was vacant at times, the garden and house ransacked and vandalised, and the garden's remains were destroyed in a battle in 1870.

In 1842, Malmaison was purchased by Queen mother Maria Christina, widow of King Ferdinand VII of Spain. She lived there with her second husband Agustín Fernando Muñoz, Duke of Riánsares (made a duke by his step-daughter, Isabella II of Spain, in 1844). In 1861, Maria Christina sold the property to Napoleon III, Josephine's grandson through her daughter Hortense. Damaged by fighting during the War of 1870, then by the installation of barracks in the château, the estate was sold by the State in 1877 to a goods merchant who gradually sold off parcels of land from the park. In 1896, the patron and philanthropist Daniel Iffla, known as Osiris, purchased the château along with its park, by then reduced to 6 hectares, and donated it to the State in 1903. A museum was opened on the estate in 1905. Malmaison was fully restored by the famous French architect Pierre Humbert in the early 20th century. It is now considered an important historical monument.

== Present times ==
The public can visit the manor house as a Napoleonic musée national. The museum lies on RN 13 (route nationale 13) from Paris and bus 258 from RER A "Grande Arche" station.

== Gallery ==
=== Exterior ===
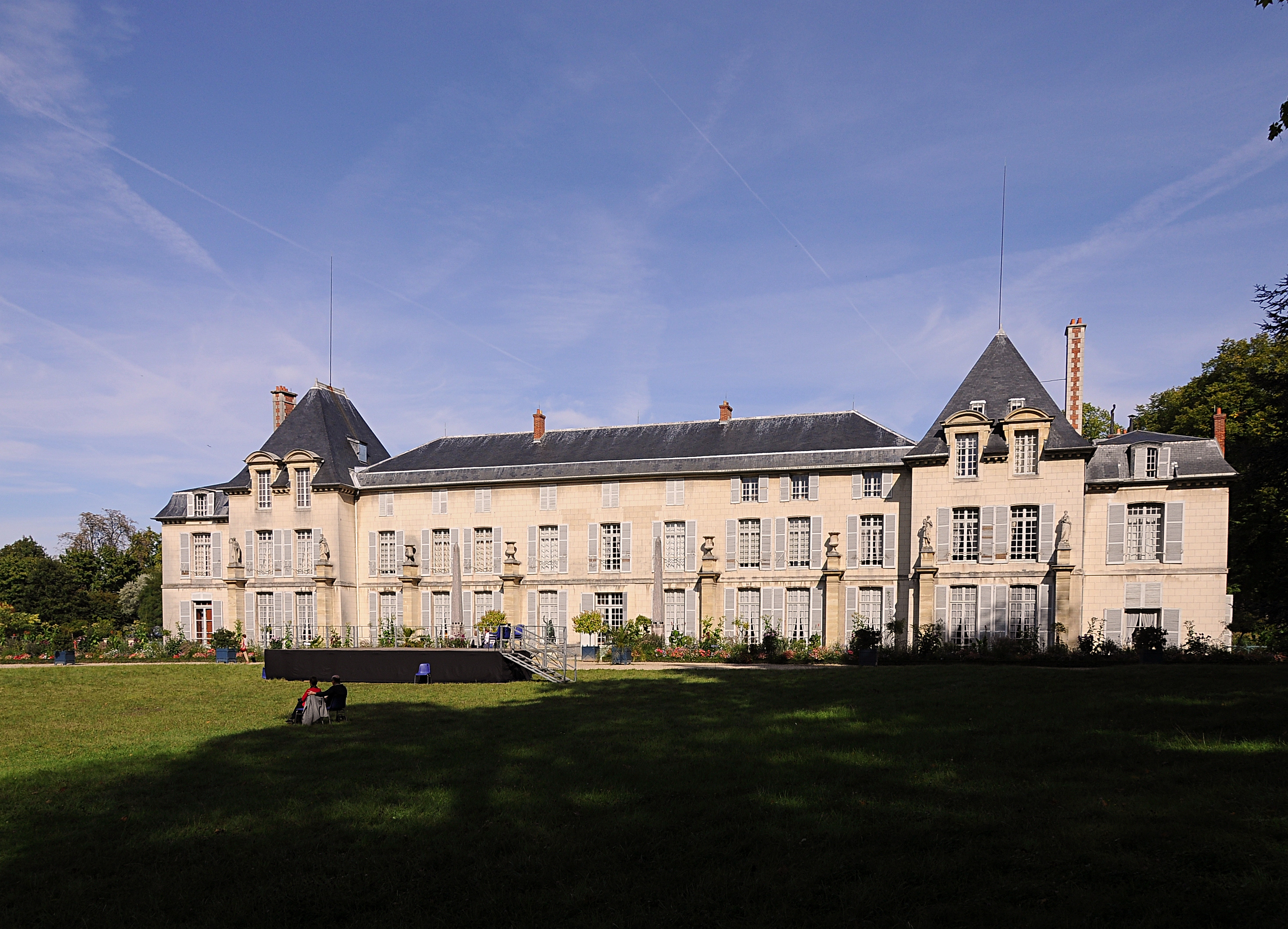
View of the southwest facade of the Manor House

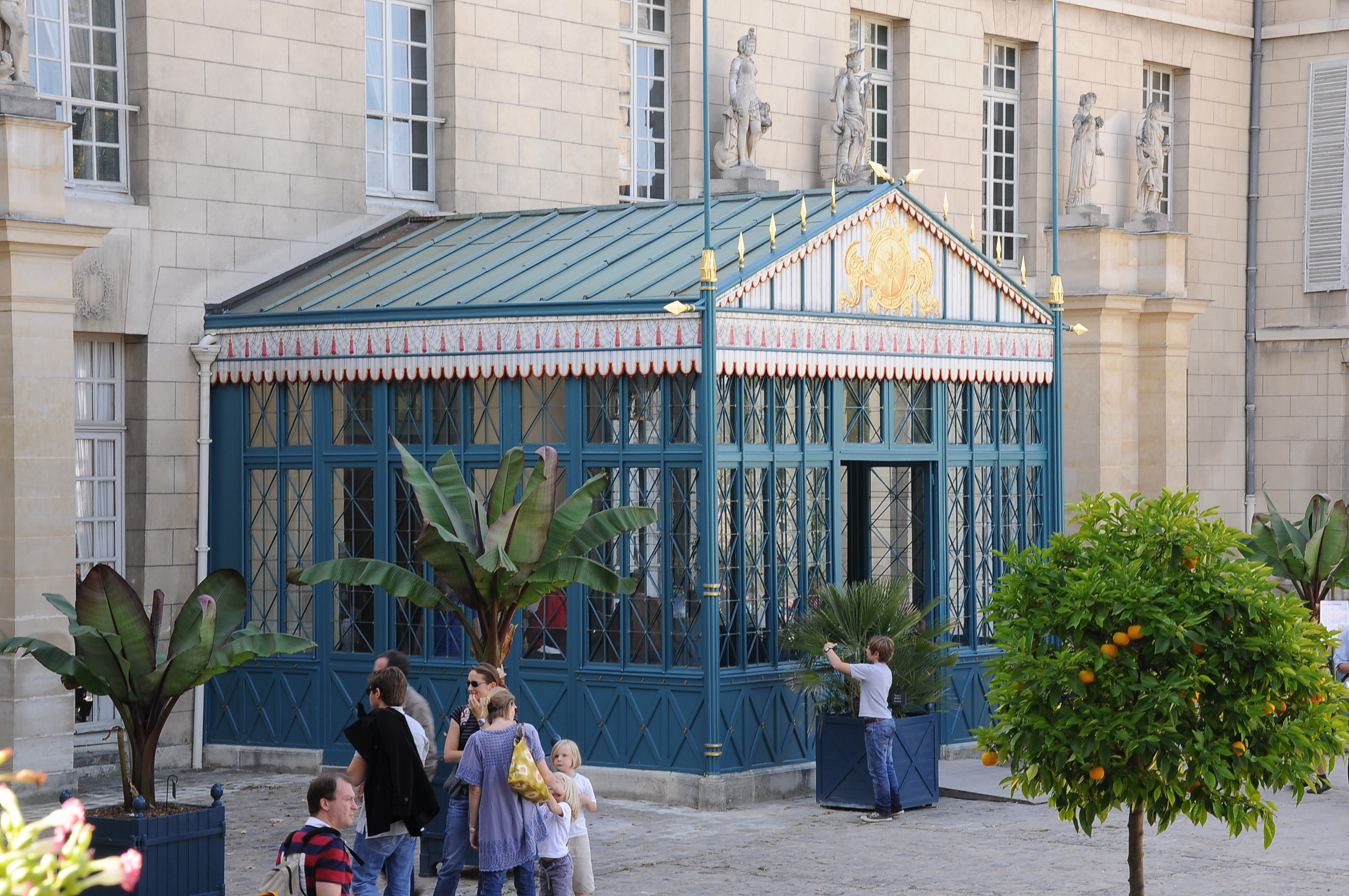
Main entrance in the Manor House

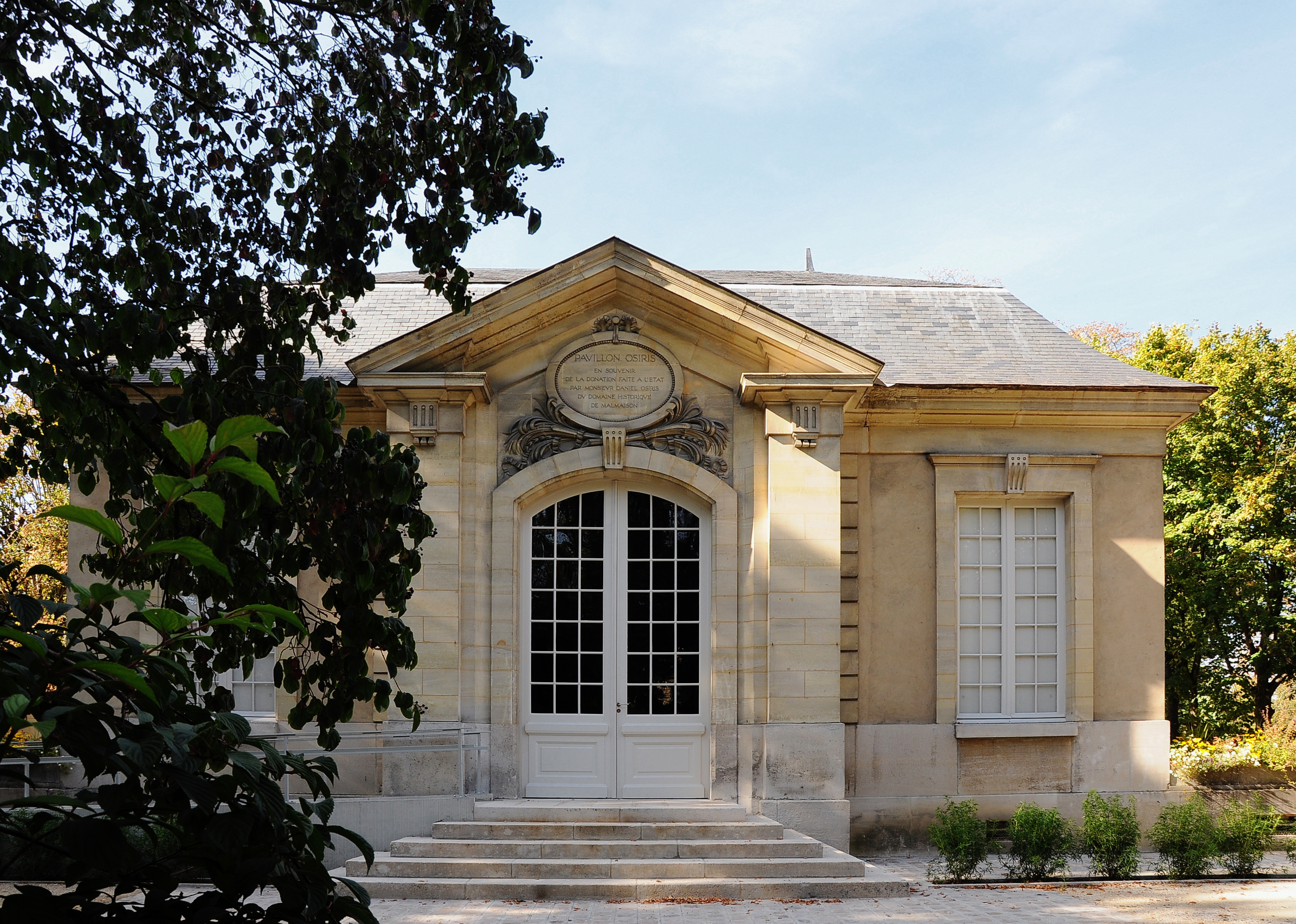
Pavillon Osiris in the Garden of Malmaison

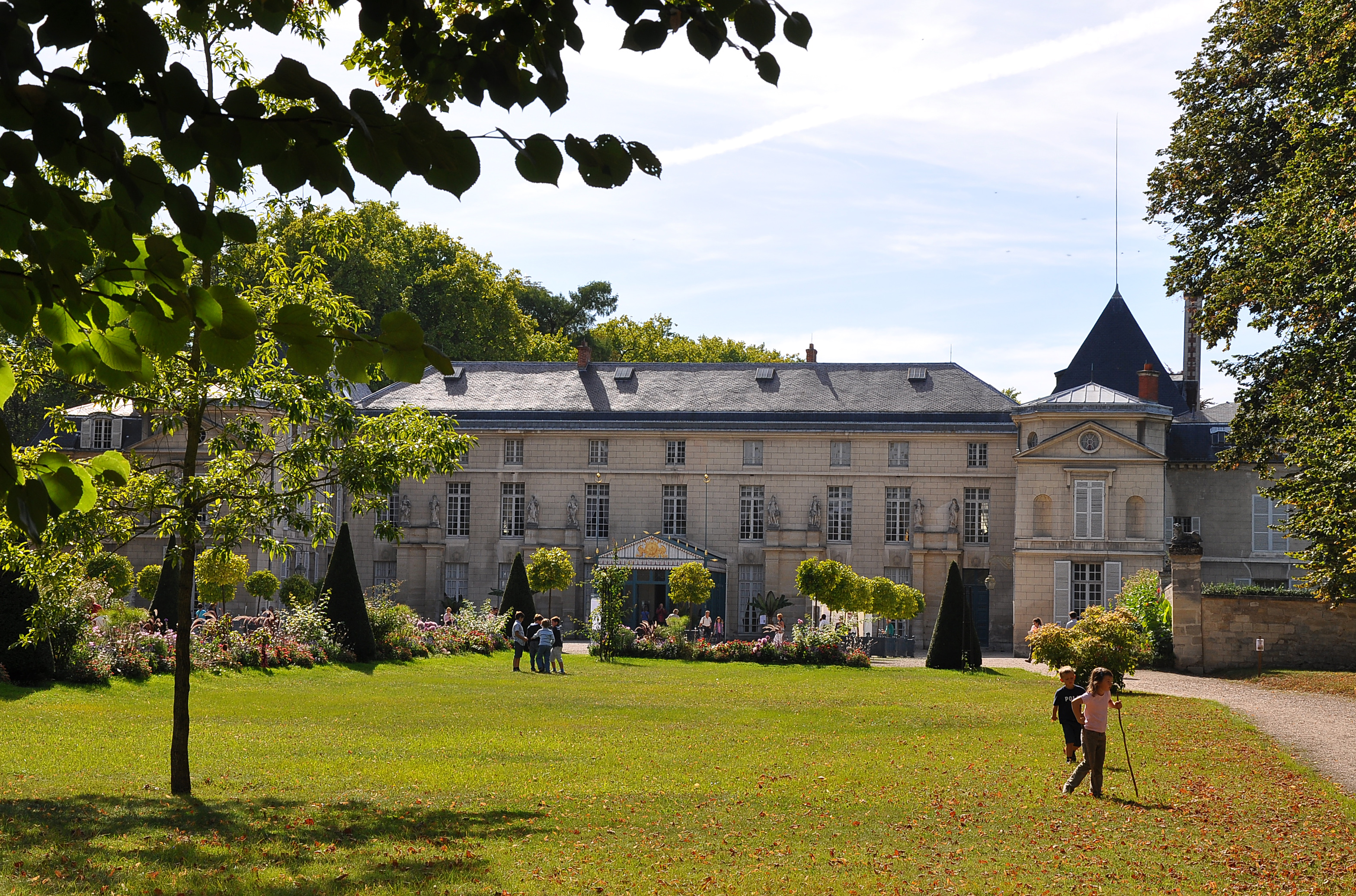
View of the main entrance and the main facade (northeast)

=== Interior ===
Assorted rooms

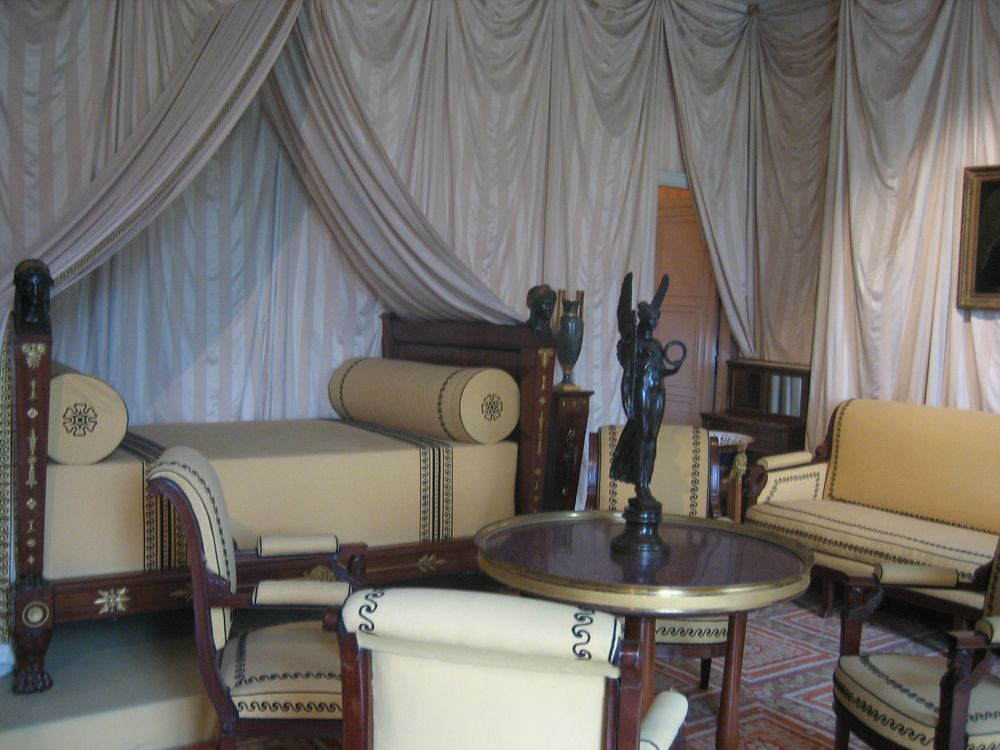
Chamber of Napoléon

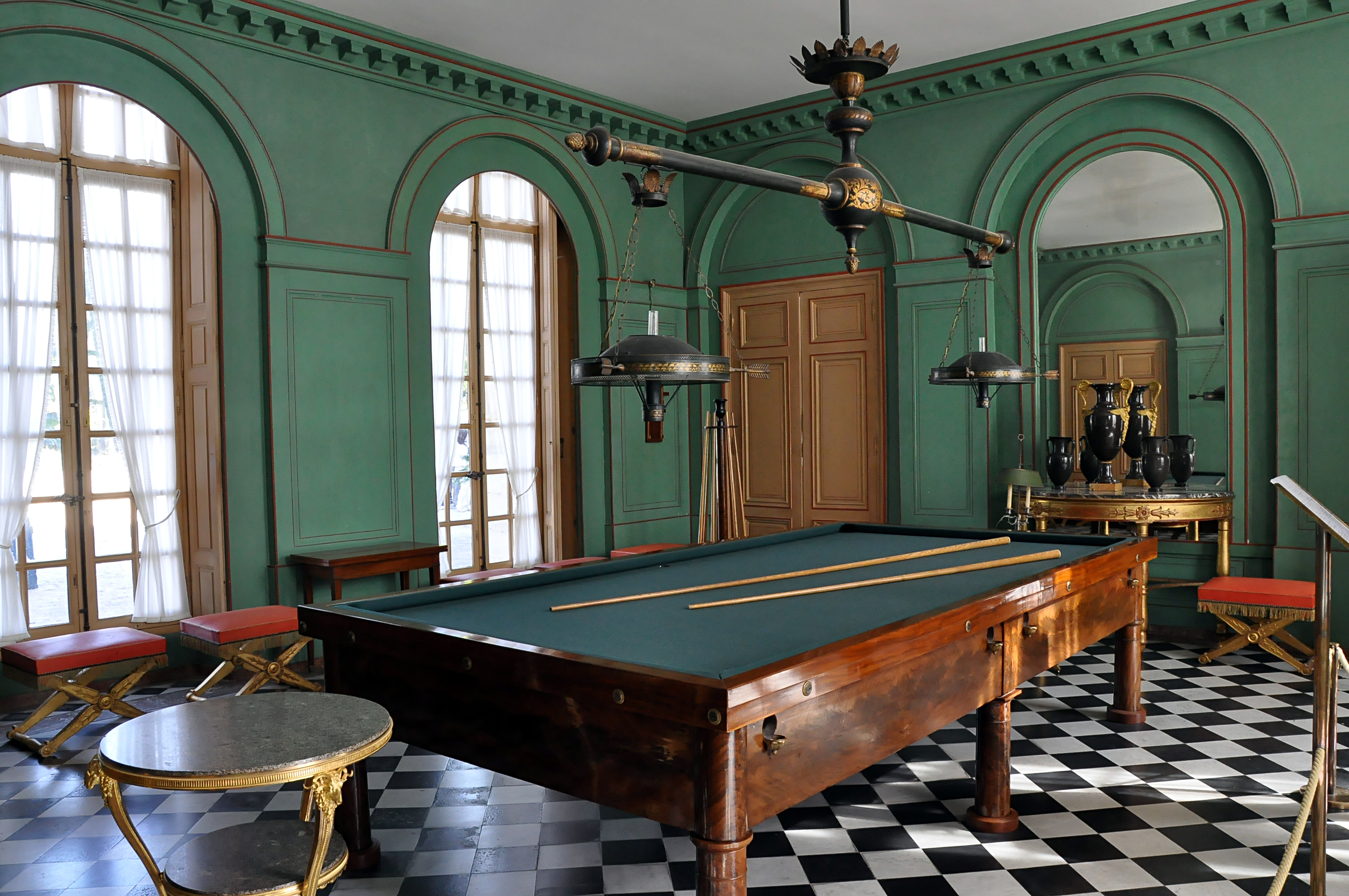
Billiard room

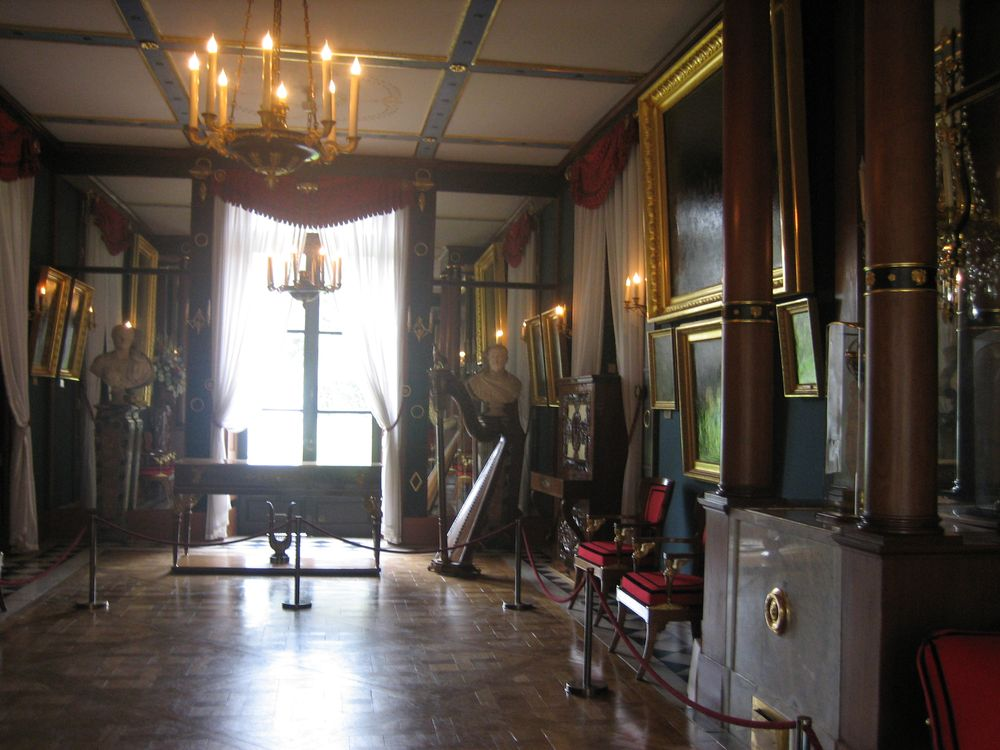
Music room

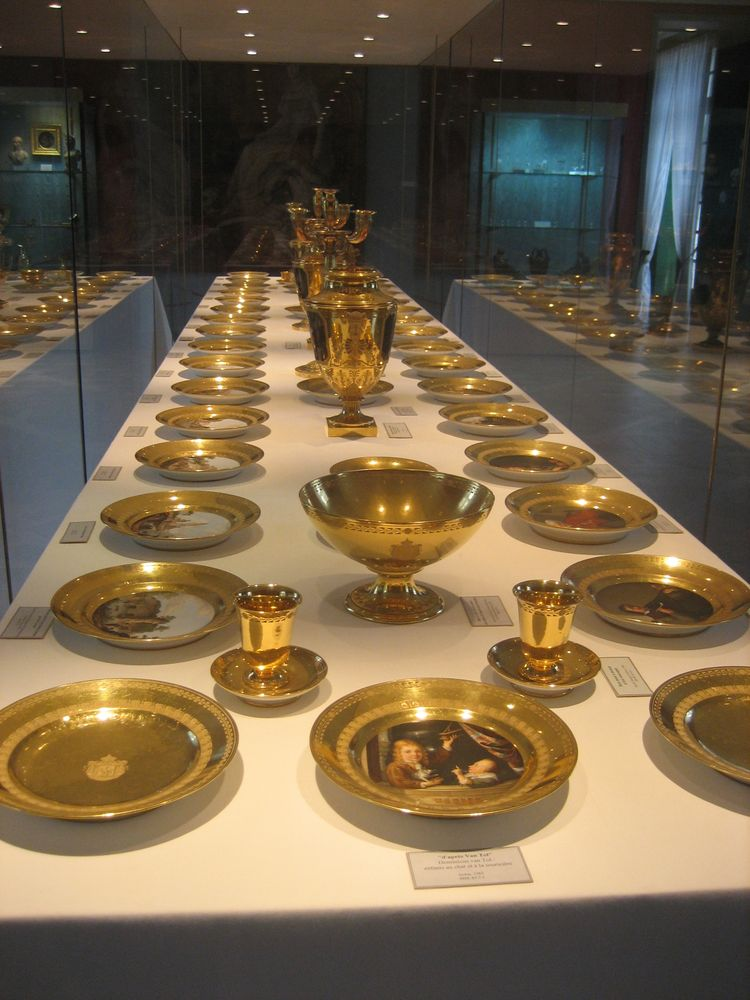
Joséphine's service - Sèvres porcelain
Library

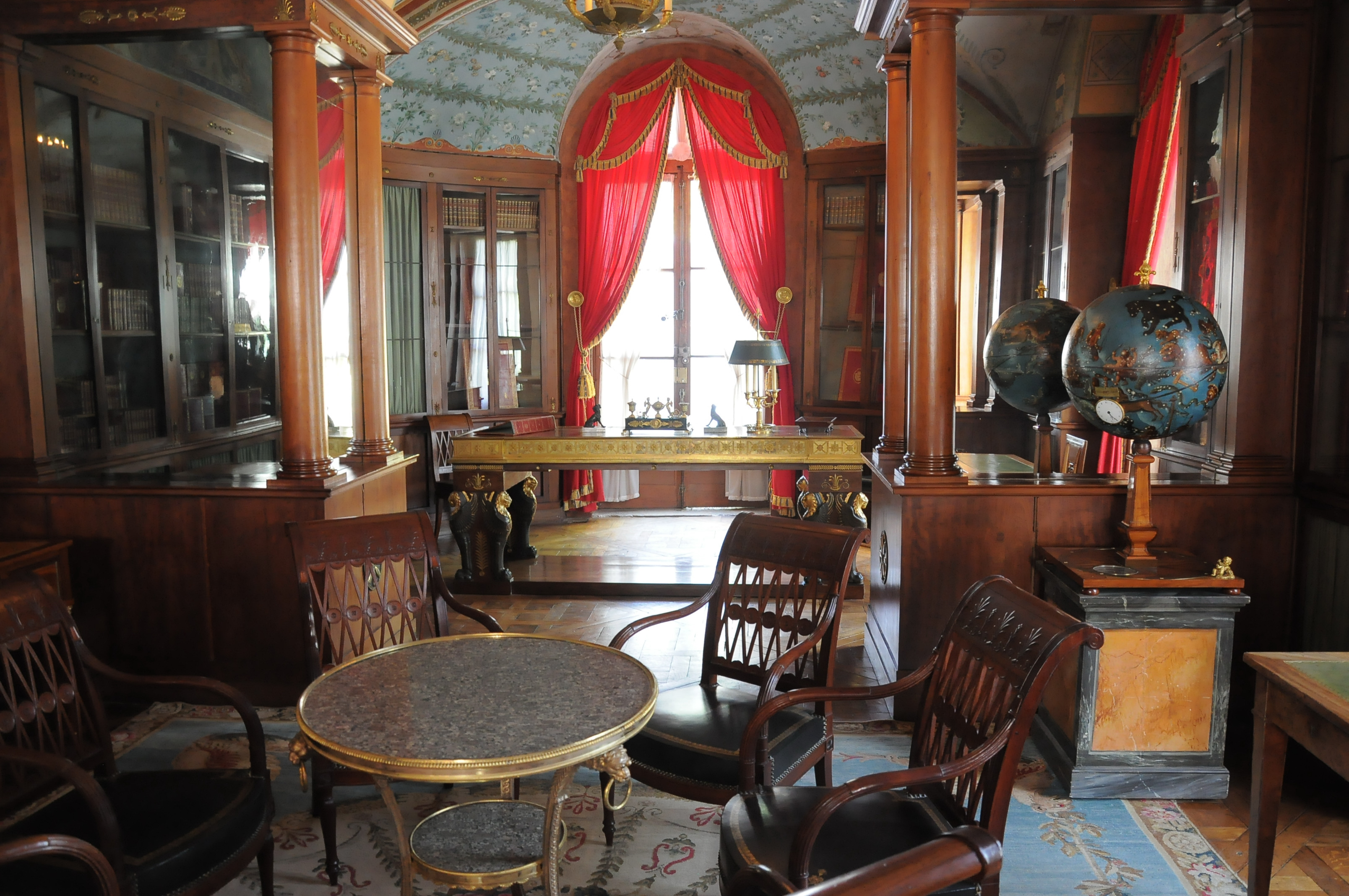
Library created in 1800 by Charles Percier and Pierre-François-Léonard Fontaine

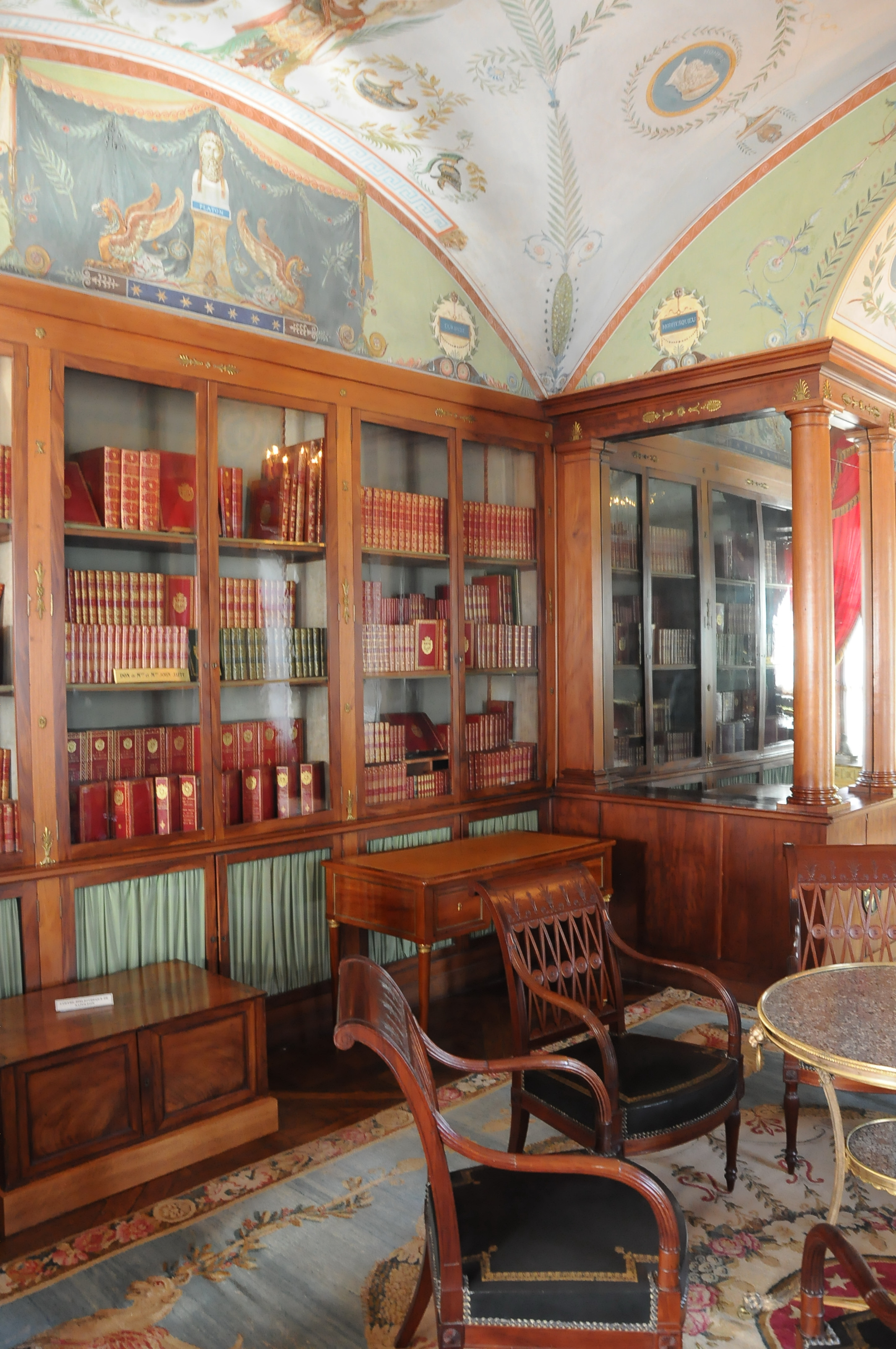
Furniture in mahogany is the creation of the brothers Jacob-Desmalter

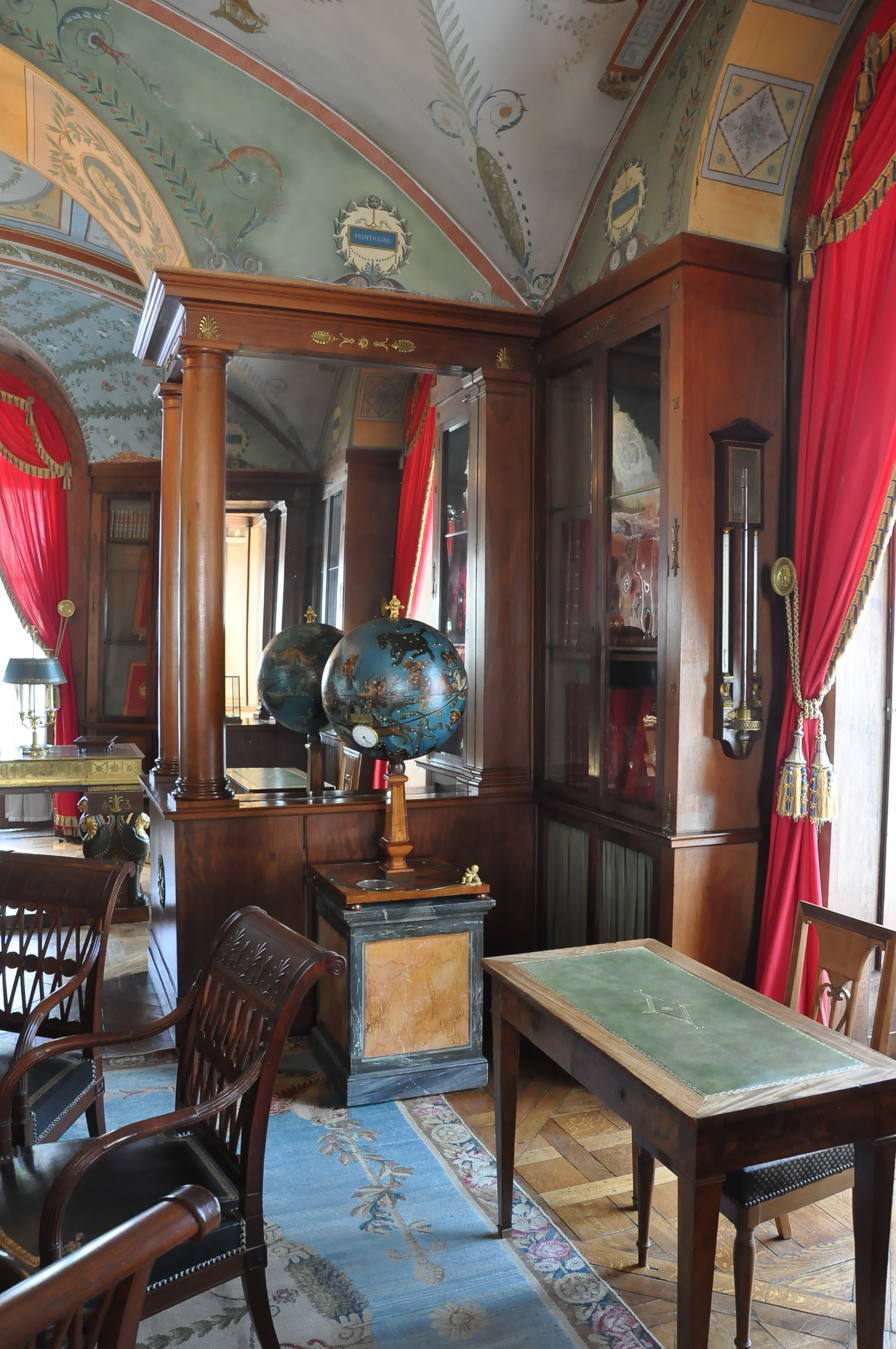
The celestial globe of Nicolas Constant Lemaire, dating from 1788
Apartment of Joséphine

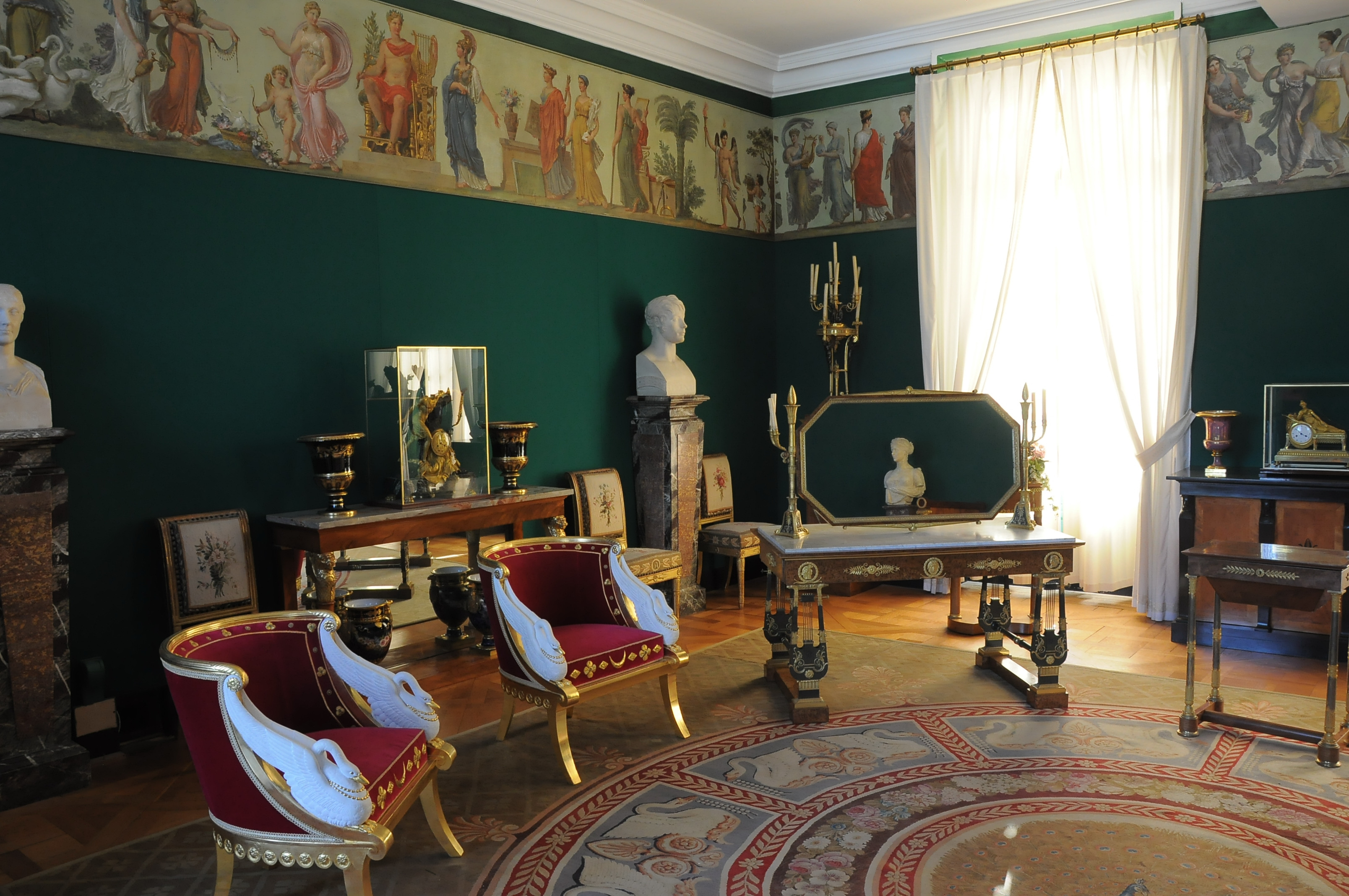
Simply decorated anteroom

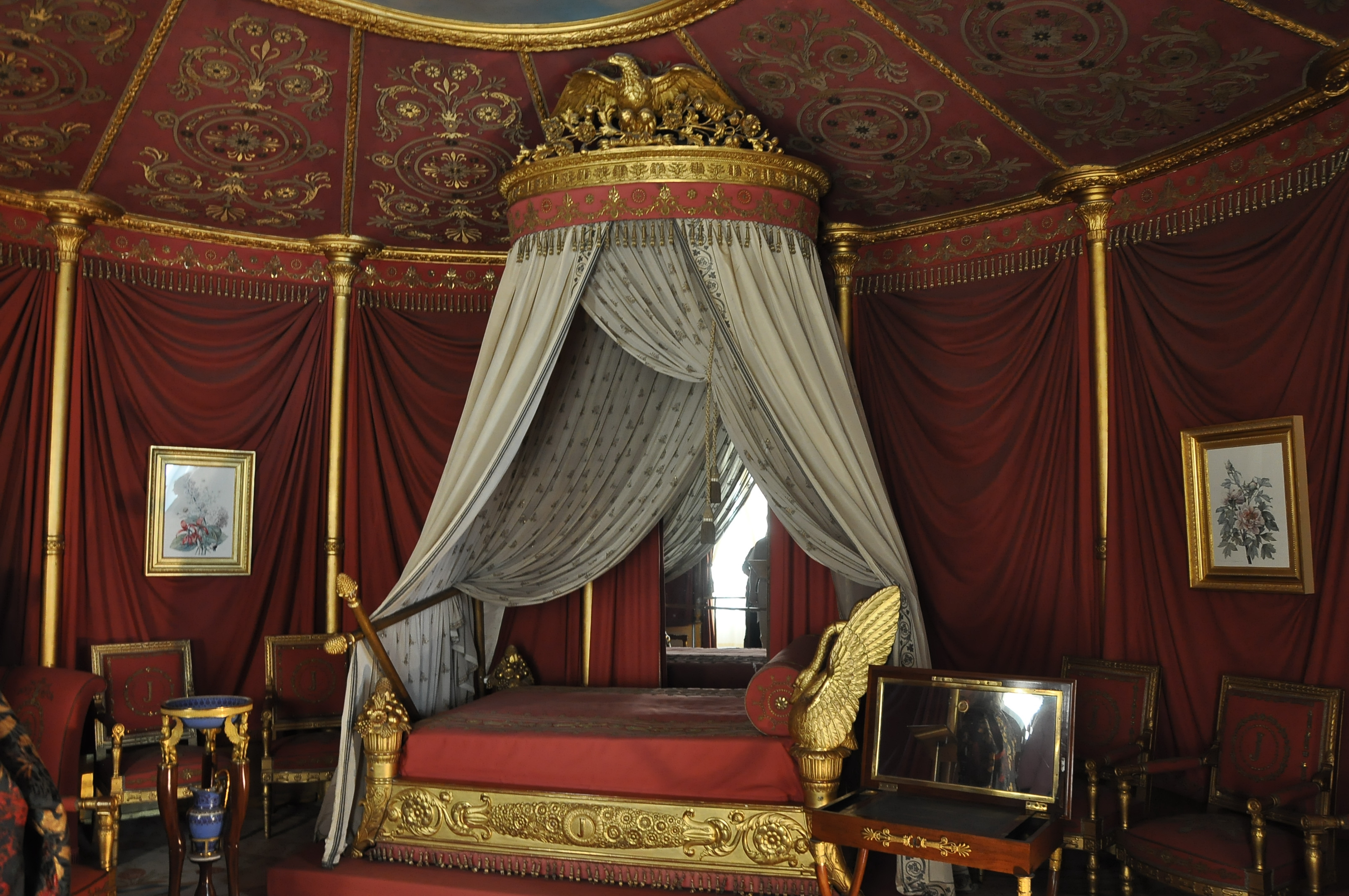
Luxurious chamber of Joséphine de Beauharnais with her original bed.

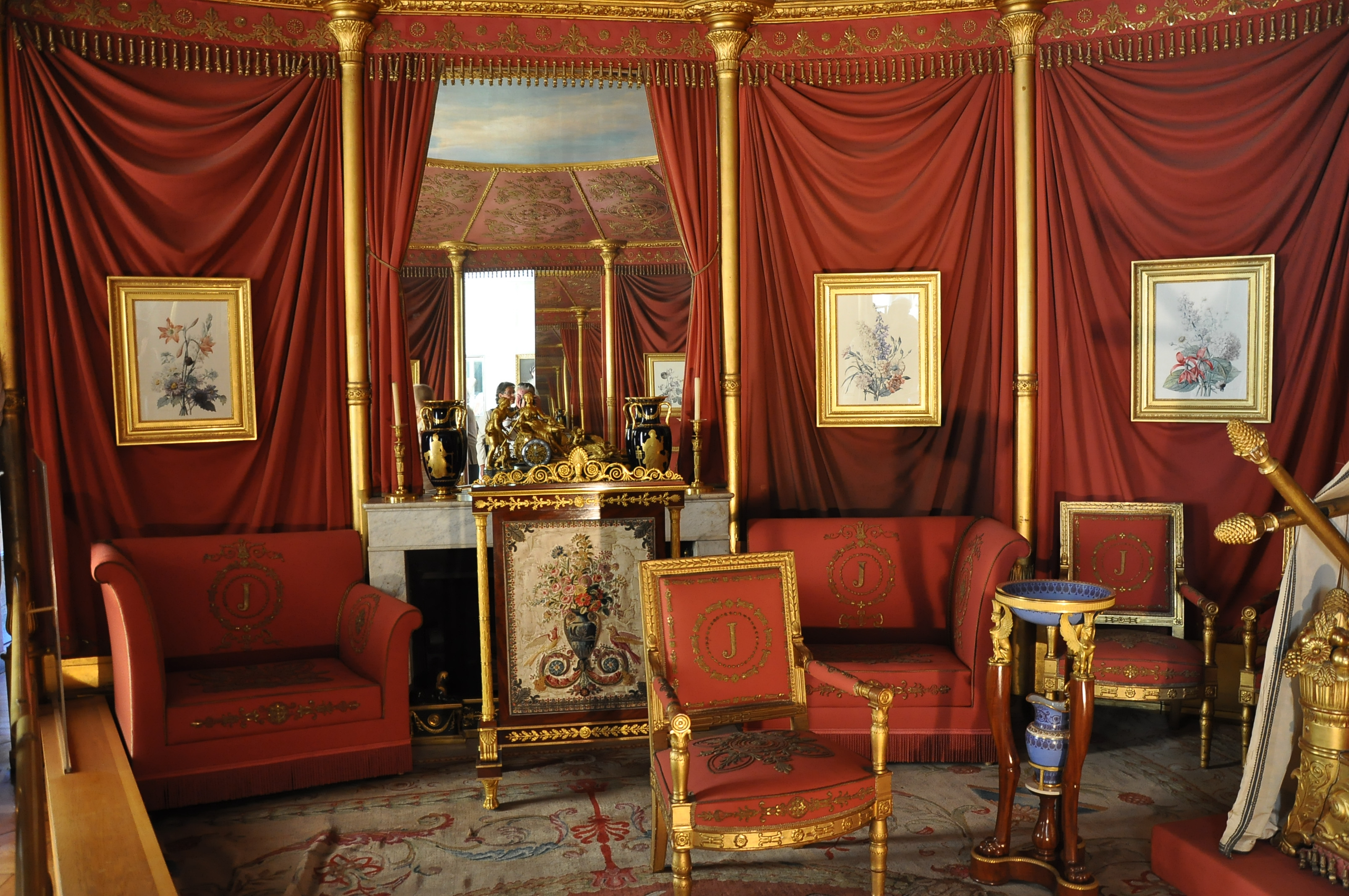
The wall decoration and the furniture were restored by Napoleon III in 1865

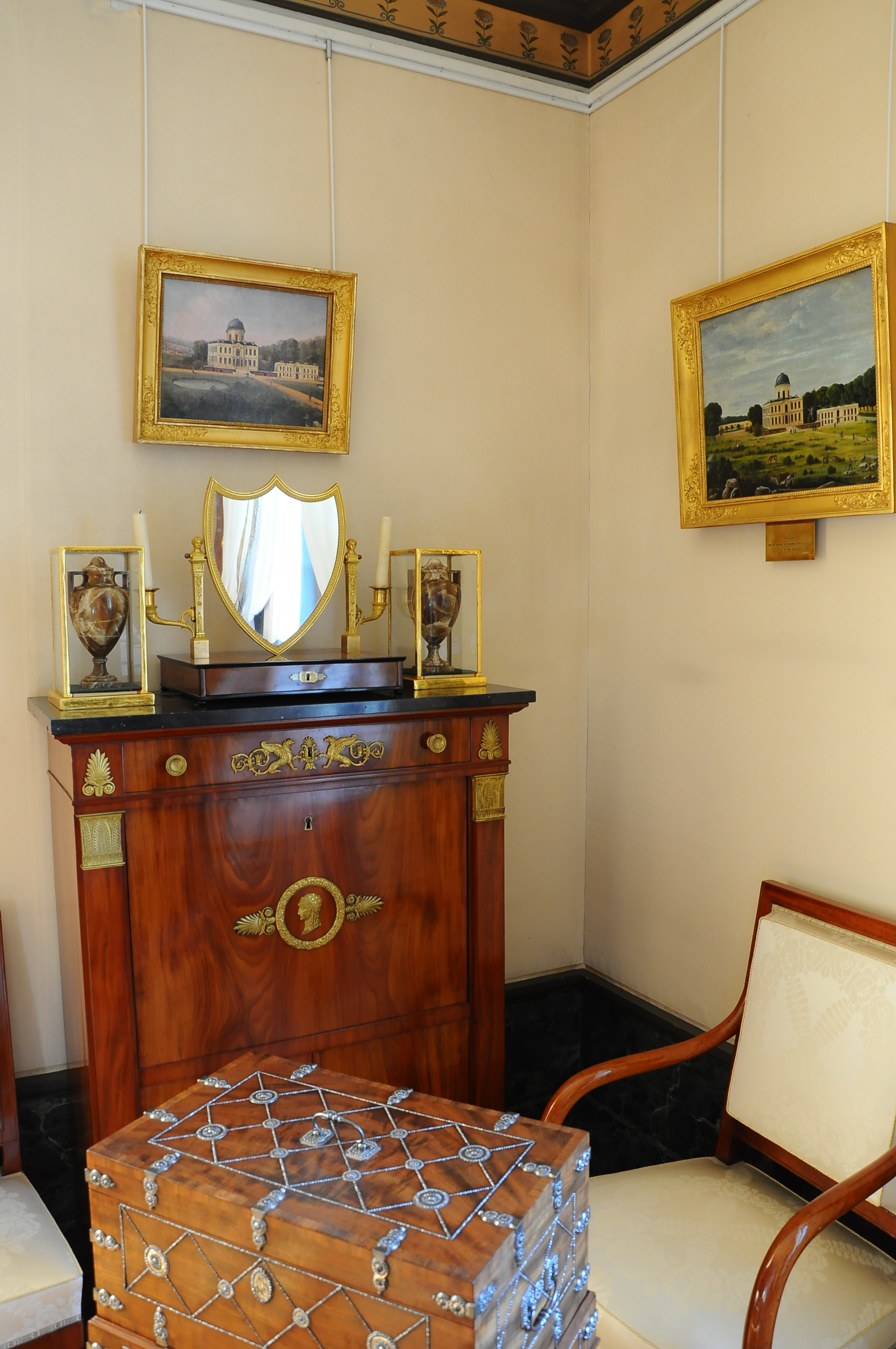
Common Chamber in Joséphine's apartment

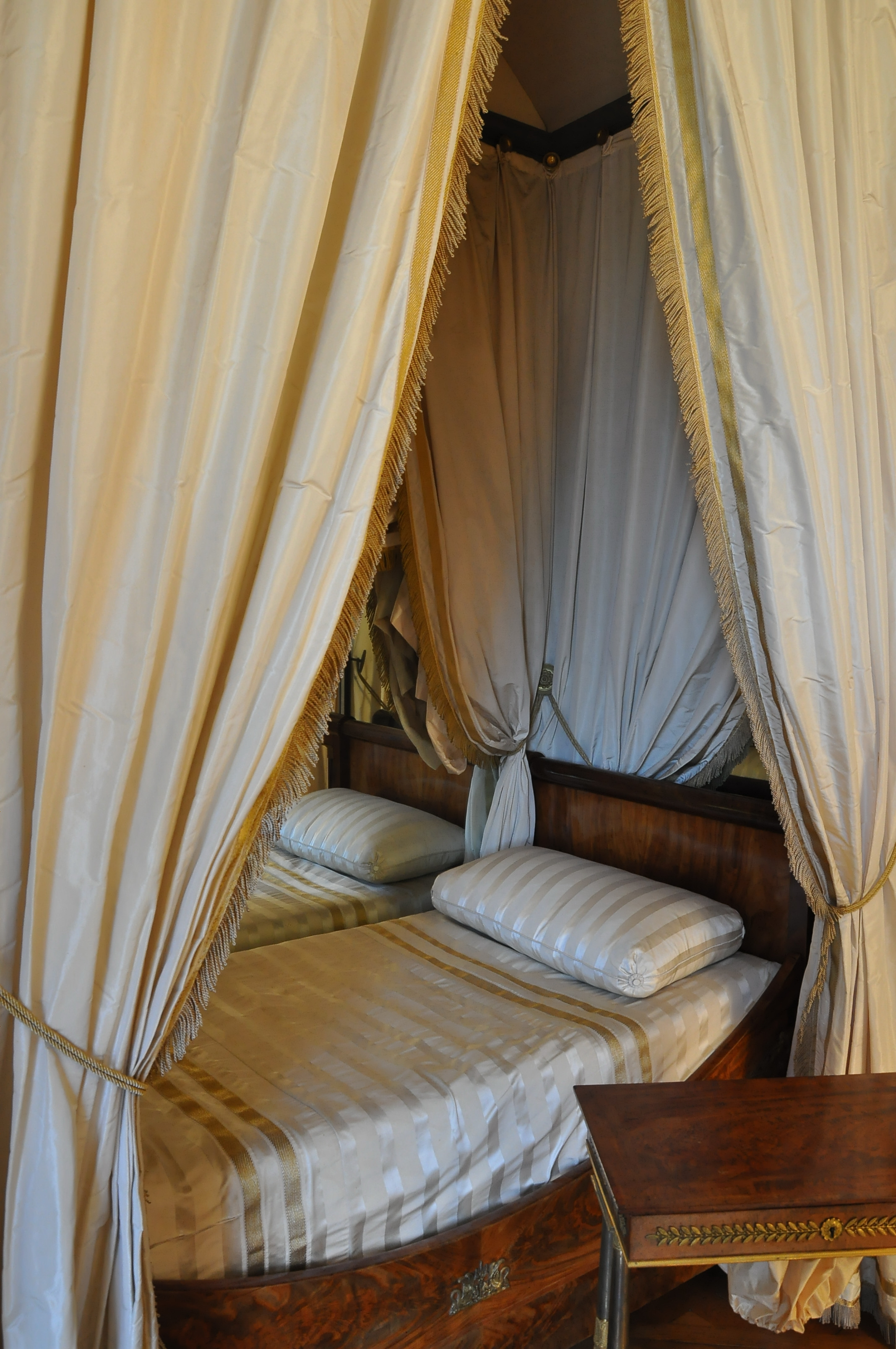
Bed in Joséphine's common chamber

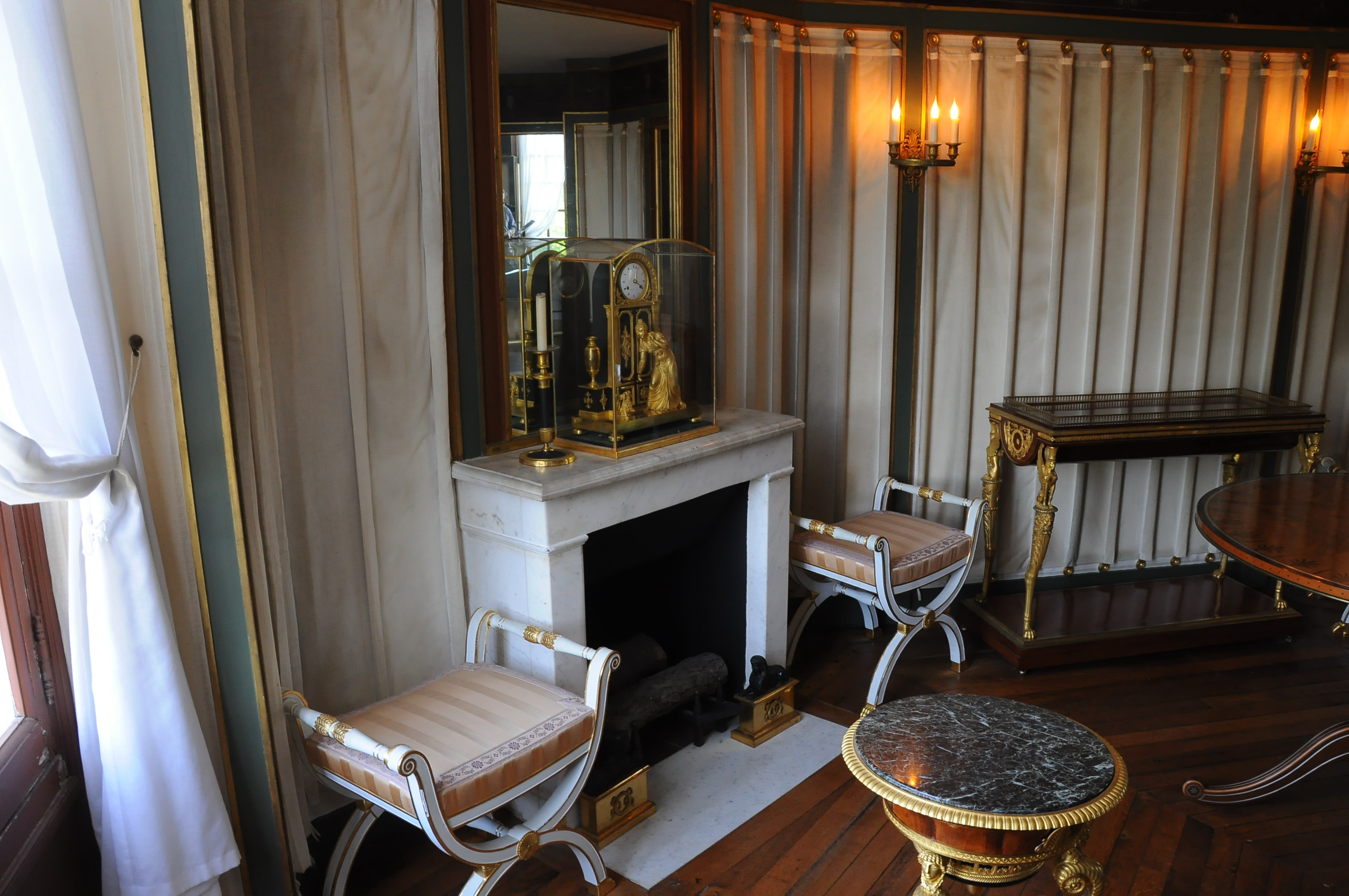
Bathroom in Joséphine's apartment
Dining room

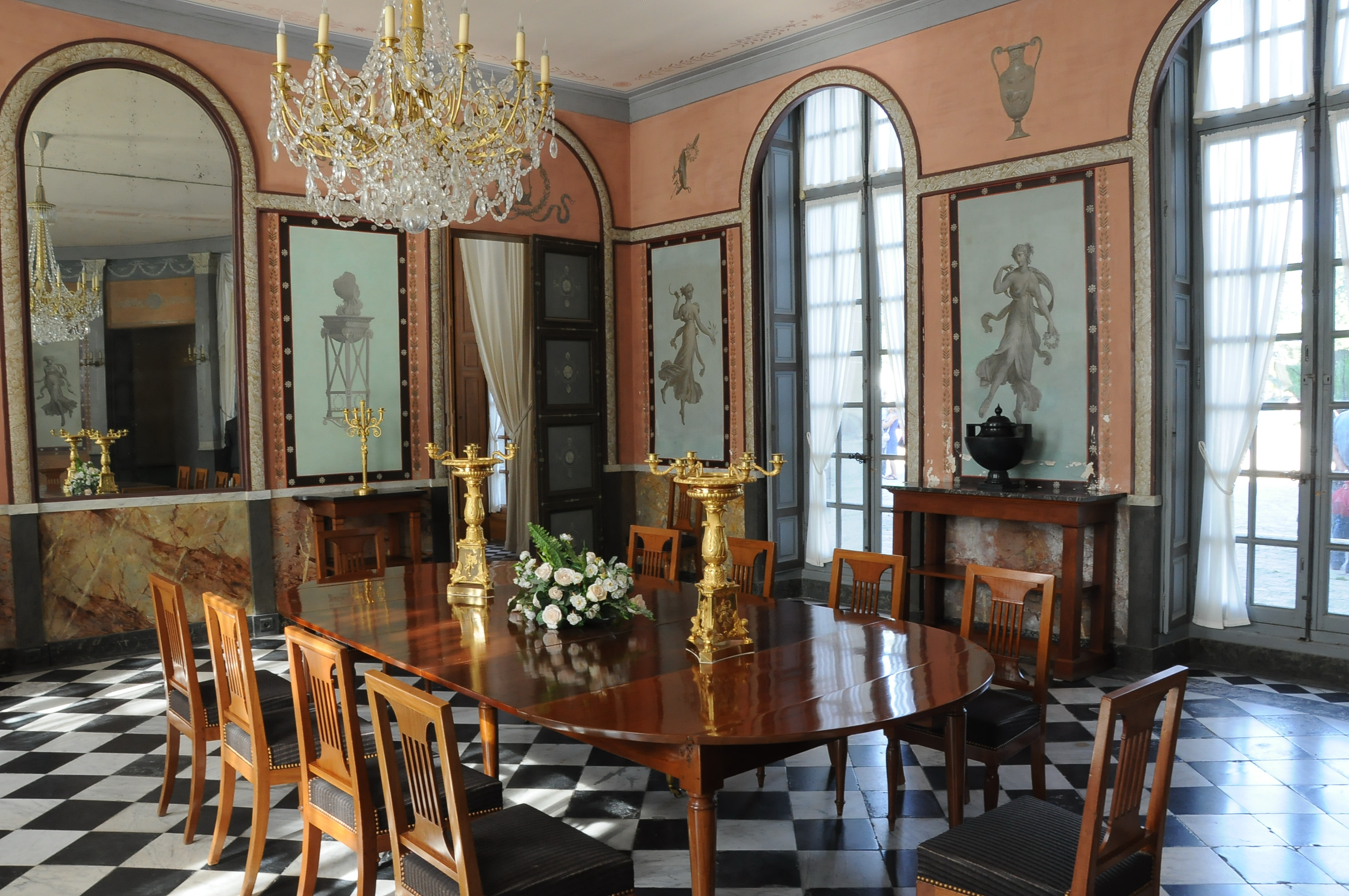
Decoration designed by Charles Percier and Pierre-François-Léonard Fontaine

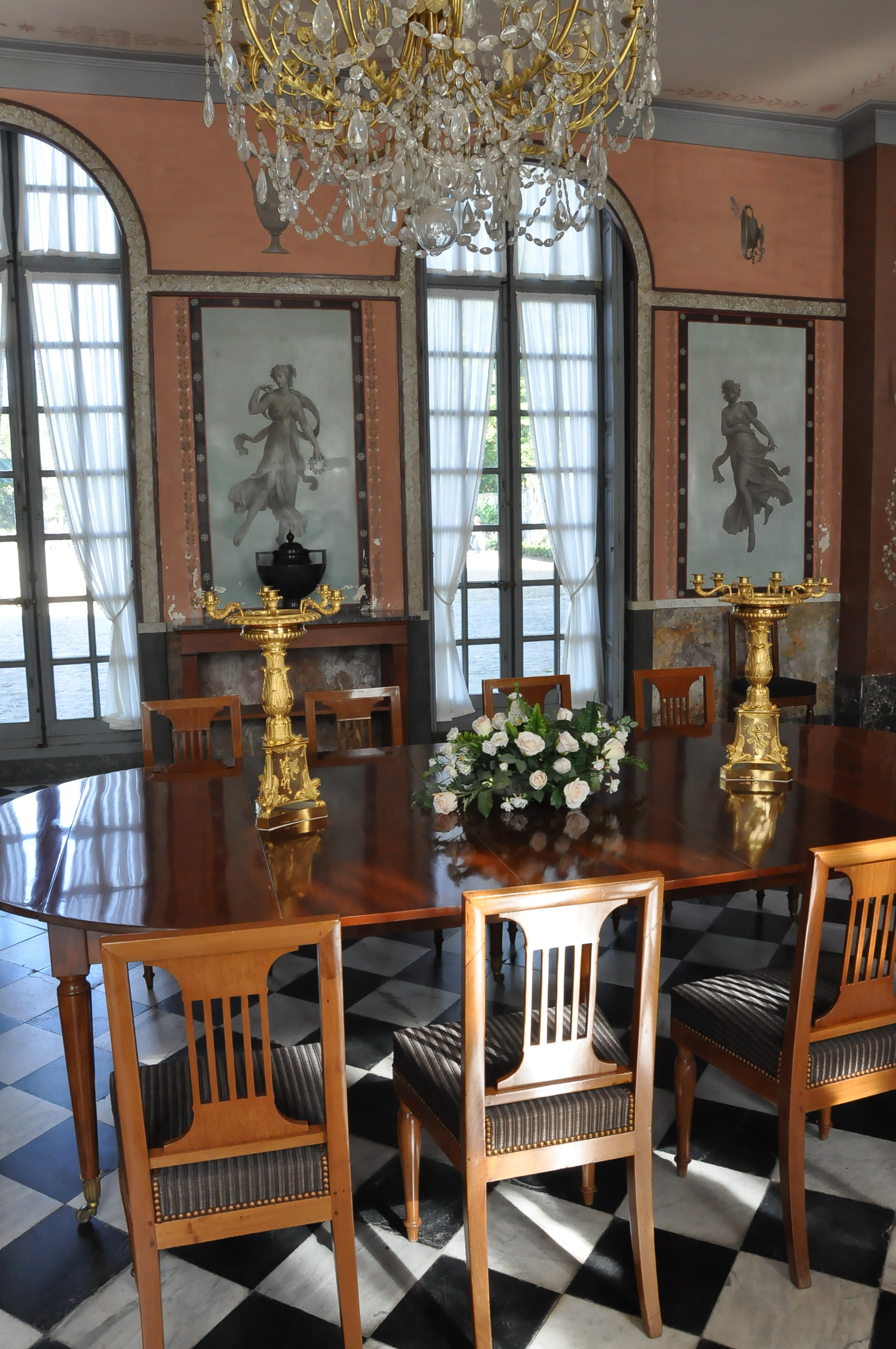
Murals paintings by Louis Lafitte (1800) represent six pompéiennes dancers

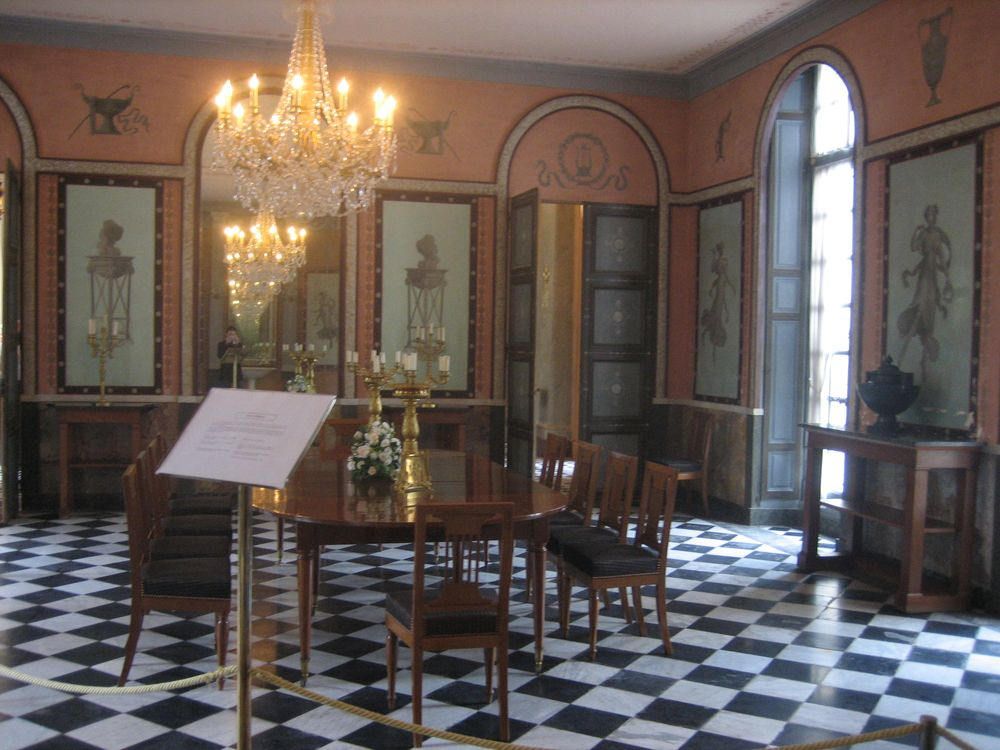
Dining room
