= Tea Rose =

Australian fashion company

Tea Rose is an Australian fashion label. Founded in 1981 by designer Rosemary Armstrong, the company specializes in formal wear.

Tea Rose has been featured in Australian media such as Vogue (including the 50th Anniversary Edition), In Style Magazine, and Madison Magazine.

Tea Rose participated in Australian Fashion Week in the early nineties.
