= Butterfly Summer =

2012 novel by Anne-Marie Conway

- Author: Anne-Marie Conway
- Language: English
- Genre: Children's novel
- Publisher: Usborne Publishing
- Publication date: 1 May 2012
- Publication place: United Kingdom
- Media type: Print (Ebook & paperback) and audiobook
- Pages: 256
- ISBN: 978-1409538592

Butterfly Summer is a 2012 children's book by British novelist Anne-Marie Conway. The novel revolves around Becky, who moves to the small village of Oakbridge and does not know anyone. Becky finds out that her mother is holding a secret and begins an intense friendship with Rosa May. Conway's inspiration for the novel's setting came from her friend talking about her day at Butterfly World, Hertfordshire. Butterfly Summer was well received by critics and won the 2013 Oxfordshire Book Award for secondary aged readers.

== Plot ==
Becky and her mother move to the small village of Oakbridge, where Becky's mother grew up, but Becky does not know anyone there. Becky then finds a photo of her mother holding a baby 12 years before she was born, which makes Becky think that her mum is hiding something from her. Becky becomes more alone due to her mum's depression and over-protectiveness, but she becomes friends with a girl called Rosa May at the local butterfly garden. Their friendship becomes intense and they spend a lot of time together. However, Rosa May becomes increasingly tempered and possessive and dislikes Becky hanging out with Mack, the son of Becky's mother's supportive friend Stella. Becky also wonders where her dad is, why she is not allowed to swim and why her mother is lying to her.

== Development ==
Butterfly Summer was written by Anne-Marie Conway. It was published by Usborne Publishing and came out on 1 May 2012. It is recommended for readers aged nine and over. The novel was dubbed as being a "gripping" yet "gentle" tale about the paranormal and friendship, and also described as "perfect" for readers of Cathy Cassidy and Karen McCombie. An excerpt of the novel was made available on The Guardian's website in May 2012.

Butterfly Summer was the first novel that Conway wrote and published that was not part of her Star Makers book series She got the idea for the novel after her friend told her about the day she spent at Butterfly World, Hertfordshire; Conway found the setting very idyllic and she decided to write a "really dark story set in a beautiful place". In Butterfly Summer, Becky and her mother move to a new village where Becky does not have any friends, and Conway compared this to when she moved to a different country at the same age as Becky where she did not know anyone or the language. In a 2015 interview, she said that Rosa May was her favourite of the characters she had written as Rosa May hates and loves Becky at the same time. The author explained that Rosa May is very bitter as "Becky is living the life that she thinks belongs to her". Conway said in 2015 that she was interested in writing a sequel to Butterfly Summer, but she had to see if her publishers were interested in that idea.

== Reception ==
Butterfly Summer won the 2013 Oxfordshire Book Award for secondary aged readers, which were nominated, shortlisted and voted for by primary school students in Oxfordshire.

Melissa Hyder from Books for Keeps called the story "seemingly gentle" and noted how it explored the themes of adolescent friendships, family secrets and parental depression; she wrote, "what makes this one special is the brooding atmosphere of secrets waiting to be discovered, which builds like a gathering summer storm". She compared the novel to those of Cathy Cassidy and she believed that Rosa May was "spirited" and had an intense friendship with Becky. Hyder wrote, "Answers are not easy and you really feel for neglected Becky who is continually left on her own and has to go through her own challenging re-evaluation of what she believes and who to trust". She added that whilst the revelations may not have surprised some readers, she thought they were handled well and went into "Revelations delve", commenting, "the intrigue is spot-on for younger readers and delivered through pitch-perfect drama and prose". Hyder also praised the portrayal of easy and "dominating" friendships, believing that they were "evocative" and that it would "resonate strongly" with the novel's readership.

Susan Elkin from The Independent dubbed the novel "compelling and moving" and praised the "Lovely" characters of Mr and Mrs Jackson, the "supportive" Stella and "common-sensible" Mack. Elkin noted how Becky is haunted "in every sense" by the past of her family and called Rosa May "demanding". She recommended the novel for "independent readers" in late Primary school and early Secondary school age. A child reviewer from The Guardian rated the novel five stars, calling it "Exciting, mesmerising and suspenseful" and one of the most enjoyable books they had ever read; they also noted how they could not put the novel down and wanted to learn more as they read along, though they called the adventure "pretty predictable". Another child reviewer from the same website dubbed the novel exciting and "suspenseful", in addition to slightly "worrying" at times; they rated the novel eight out of ten, writing that it had a "brilliant plot" but could have been a bit more engaging at the start of the novel. LoveReading4Kids called the book a "gripping story which catches the importance of friendship – even when there are dark, dark secrets".

Loralei Haylock from The Bookbag wrote that she was "completely swept up" in the tale from its first page, opining that children who have moved from home will empathise with Becky's journey and that the story is mainly about "that discovery that parents did once have a life before you came along". She wrote, "While Becky's mother has rather more secrets than I would hope most do, Conway perfectly captures that unsettling feeling of realising that your parents were once young, irresponsible, and did things that you didn't know about, wouldn't have thought they would. The setting is beautifully done, with the hot oppressive summer perfectly matching the tone of the story, and the butterfly garden itself embodying the relationship between Becky and Rosa May". Haylock praised the novel for its portrayal of the more serious themes such as depression for being dealt in a sensitive manner "without sugar coating", and she called Rosa May energetic, mysterious, unpredictable and slightly frightening, opining that the character's "changeable nature" made the novel have a "real sense" of tension and danger. She added, "It's really not the story of light and happiness suggested by the title, but a much more weighty read that will give readers something to really think about." However, Haylock criticised the proof copy's blurb for making the plot twist at the end of the story "really evident" as she guessed the twist quite early on when reading the novel, adding, "It's the sort of story where the less is said, the more readers will get out of it".
