= Rosa 'Silver Jubilee' =

Apricot blend hybrid tea rose

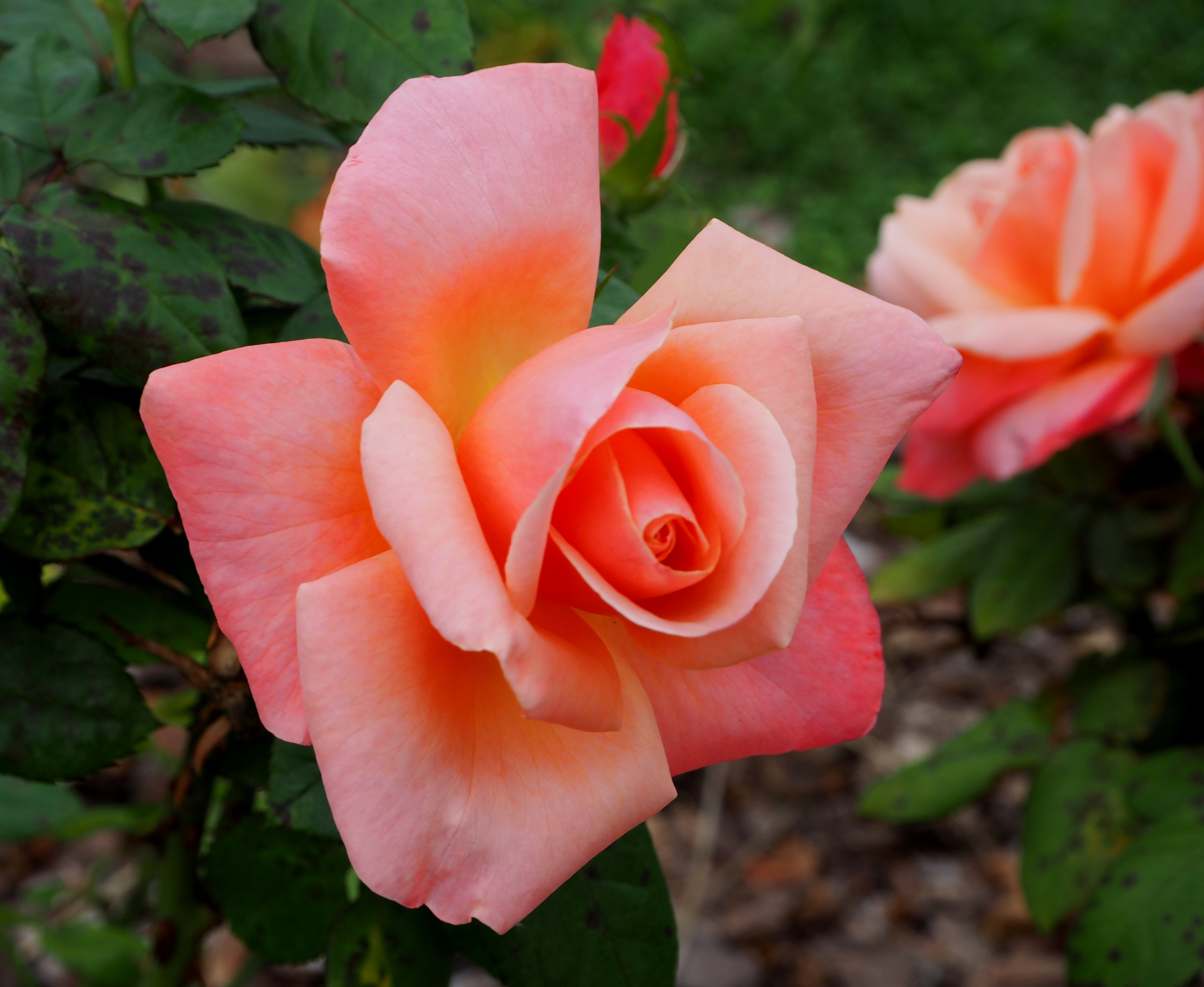
- Rosa 'Silver Jubilee'
- Genus: Rosa 'hybrid'
- Cultivar group: Hybrid tea
- Origin: Alec Cocker, (Scotland, 1978)

Rosa 'Silver Jubilee' is an apricot blend hybrid tea rose created by Scottish rose breeder, Alec Cocker. The rose was named in honour of the Silver Jubilee of Queen Elizabeth II in 1977. The rose was awarded the Royal National Rose Society's President's International Trophy, the Belfast Gold medal, the Portland Gold Medal and the James Mason Memorial Prize.

== Description ==
'Silver Jubillee' is a hybrid tea rose, It is a medium-sized shrub, 3 to 4 ft (90–120 cm) in height, with a 2 to 3 ft (60–90 cm) spread. Blooms have an average diameter of 5 inches (12 cm) and can have up to 40 petals. The rose has a large, full, high-centered bloom form. The color is apricot blend, varying from pink to apricot, and salmon with shades of peach. 'Silver Jubilee' blooms in flushes from spring to fall, but does not thrive in warmer climates. The plant has dark, glossy green leaves.

== History ==
=== James Cocker & Sons ===
James Cocker & Sons was established by James Cocker (1807-1880) in 1841 in Aberdeen, Scotland. He initially sold forest trees and herbaceous plants. Cocker's son, James (1832-1897), took over the company when his father died in 1880. Cocker's three sons, William, James and Alexander, joined the company in the 1880s. With the growing popularity of roses, the Cockers initiated a rose breeding program in the early 1890s. The three sons took over the management of the company after Cocker's death in 1897. The nursery's first commercially successful rose variety was 'Mrs. Cocker' (1899). Alexander became the sole owner of the company after the deaths of his two brothers. Alexander Cocker died in 1920 and the company was passed to his two young children, Margaret and Alexander Morison (Alec) (1907-1977), through a trust. The business was dissolved in 1923.

Alec Cocker reestablished the company as a general nursery in 1936. He rented a field in Aberdeen and initially grew perennials and roses. During the Second World War, Cocker joined the Civil Defence Service, where he met Anne Rennie (1920-2014). Cocker and Anne became engaged, and after the war formed a new nursery business using Anne's £80 war grant. Alec and Anne began specialising in growing and breeding roses in the 1960s. Their first rose varieties included 'Morning Jewel' (1968), and 'White Cockade' (1969). The hybrid tea, 'Alec's Red' (1970), was awarded the Royal National Rose Society's (RNRS) President's International Trophy in 1970.

=== Silver Jubilee ===
Alec Cocker's most famous rose variety was the hybrid tea, 'Silver Jubilee'. The new rose variety was named with permission of the Queen to commemorate her 25-year reign. The rose was created from a cross between (floribunda, 'Highlight' and hybrid tea, 'Colour Wonder) and (floribunda, 'Parkdirector Riggers' and hybrid tea, 'Piccadilly'). The new rose made its debut at the 1977 Chelsea Flower Show. Alec died of a heart attack in 1977 and did not live to see his rose's success. Anne introduced the rose commercially in Britain in 1978. 'Silver Jubilee' won the Royal National Rose Society (RNRS) President's International Trophy (Britain) in 1977, the Portland Gold Medal (United States) in 1981, the Belfast Gold Medal (Northern Ireland) in 1985 and the James Mason Memorial Prize (Britain) in 1981.

=== Anne Cocker ===
After Alec's death, Anne managed the company until she was in her eighties. She continued the rose breeding program, developing new rose varieties, including 'Remember Me' (1979), 'Braveheart' (1993), and 'Heart of Gold' (2001). She won multiple horticultural awards during her career. She died in 2014. The business continues today under the management, of Alec Cocker Jr.

=== Child plants ===
- Rosa 'Remember Me' (1984)
- Rosa 'Abbeyfield Rose' (1985)
- Rosa 'Fyvie Castle' (1985)
- Rosa 'Lincoln Cathedral' (1985)
- Rosa 'Wandering Minstrel' (1986)
- Rosa 'Rosa Armada' (1988)
- Rosa 'High Sheriff' (1992)
- Rosa 'Tina Turner' (1992)
- Rosa 'American Honor' (1993)
- Rosa 'Aladdin's Dream' (1995)
- Rosa 'Super Hero' (1996)
- Rosa 'Daybreaker' (2003)

== See also ==
- Garden roses
- Rose Hall of Fame
- List of Award of Garden Merit roses
