= James Cocker & Sons =

Rose nursery in Aberdeen, Scotland

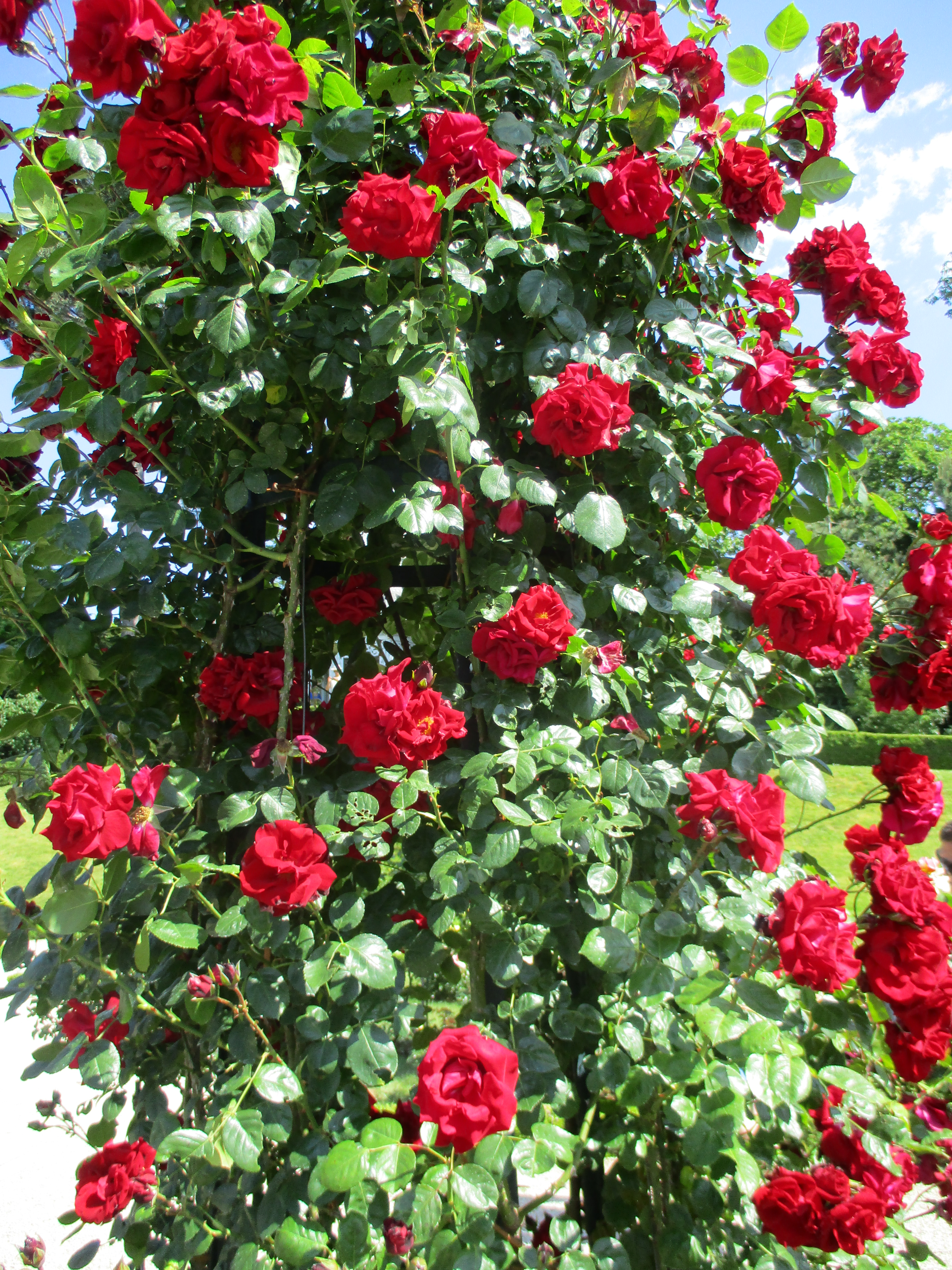
Rosa Morning Jewel (1968)

James Cocker and Sons is a nursery business located in Aberdeen, Scotland. Founded in 1841 (185 years ago) by James Cocker, the company has been owned by the Cocker family for five generations. During the last seventy years, the nursery has introduced more than 100 new rose varieties and holds Royal Warrants from Queen Elizabeth, the Queen Mother, and the Prince of Wales. James Cocker & Sons is best known for creating the hybrid tea rose, 'Silver Jubilee', the popular rose named in honour of the Queen's 25 years reign. The rose was developed by Alec Cocker, and introduced by his wife, Anne Cocker, after Alec's death in 1977. Anne continued to breed roses and manage the company until she was in her eighties. She won multiple horticultural awards and was internationally recognized for her work.

== History ==
=== 1841 to 1929 ===
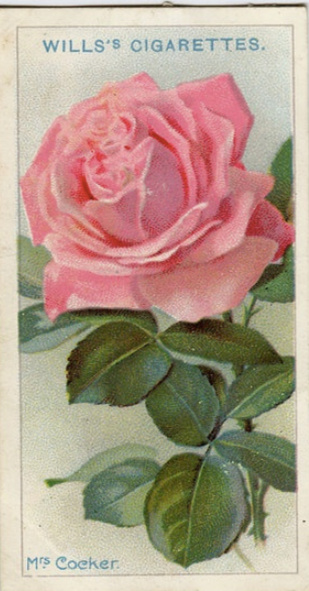
'Mrs Cocker' cigarette rose card, 1912

James Cocker & Sons was founded by James Cocker (1807-1880) in 1841 in Aberdeen, Scotland. Cocker established the nursery after he left his job as head gardener at Castle Fraser. Cocker originally sold forest trees and herbaceous plants. He later acquired additional property nearby and set up a seed warehouse on Union Street, in Aberdeen. Cocker's son, James (1832-1897), took over the company when his father died in 1880.

Cocker's three sons, William, James and Alexander, joined the company in the 1880s. With the growing popularity of roses, the Cockers initiated a rose breeding program in the early 1890s. After Cocker died in 1897, his three sons took over the management of the company. The nursery's initial rose introductions in 1892, were two sports out of the Hybrid perpetuals, 'Duke of Fife' and 'Duchess of Fife'. The nursery's first commercially successful rose variety was 'Mrs. Cocker' (1899). Alexander became the sole owner of the company after the deaths of his two brothers. Alexander Cocker died in 1920 and the company was put into a trust for his two young children, Margaret and Alexander Morison (Alec) (1907-1977). The nursery was closed in 1923.

=== 1930 to 1977 ===
Alec Cocker reopened the business as a general nursery in 1936. He rented a field in Aberdeen and initially grew perennials and roses. During the Second World War, Cocker joined the Civil Defence Service, where he met Anne Rennie (1920-2014). Cocker and Anne became engaged, and after the war formed a new nursery business using Anne's £80 war grant. The young couple delayed their marriage until 1952, waiting until their new company was thriving. Cocker and Anne expanded their business in 1959, when they bought a larger property on the outskirts of Aberdeen.

The Cockers began specialising in breeding new rose varieties in the 1960s. Their first rose varieties include, 'Morning Jewel' (1968), 'Rosy Mantle' (1968) and 'White Cockade' (1969). The hybrid tea, 'Alec's Red' (1970), was awarded the Royal National Rose Society's (RNRS) President's International Trophy in 1970. In 1976, Cocker was granted a Royal Warrant by the Queen. Cocker's' most celebrated rose variety, an apricot blend hybrid tea, 'Silver Jubilee', was named with permission of the Queen to celebrate her 25-year reign. Cocker died of a heart attack in 1977 and did not live to see his rose's success.

=== 1978 to 2020 ===
Anne introduced 'Silver Jubilee' in 1978, the year after Cocker's death. She continued to manage the nursery, and later expanded the business. She was granted Cocker's Royal Warrant as supplier to the Queen of bare root roses. She managed the rose breeding program at the company, creating new rose varieties well into her eighties.

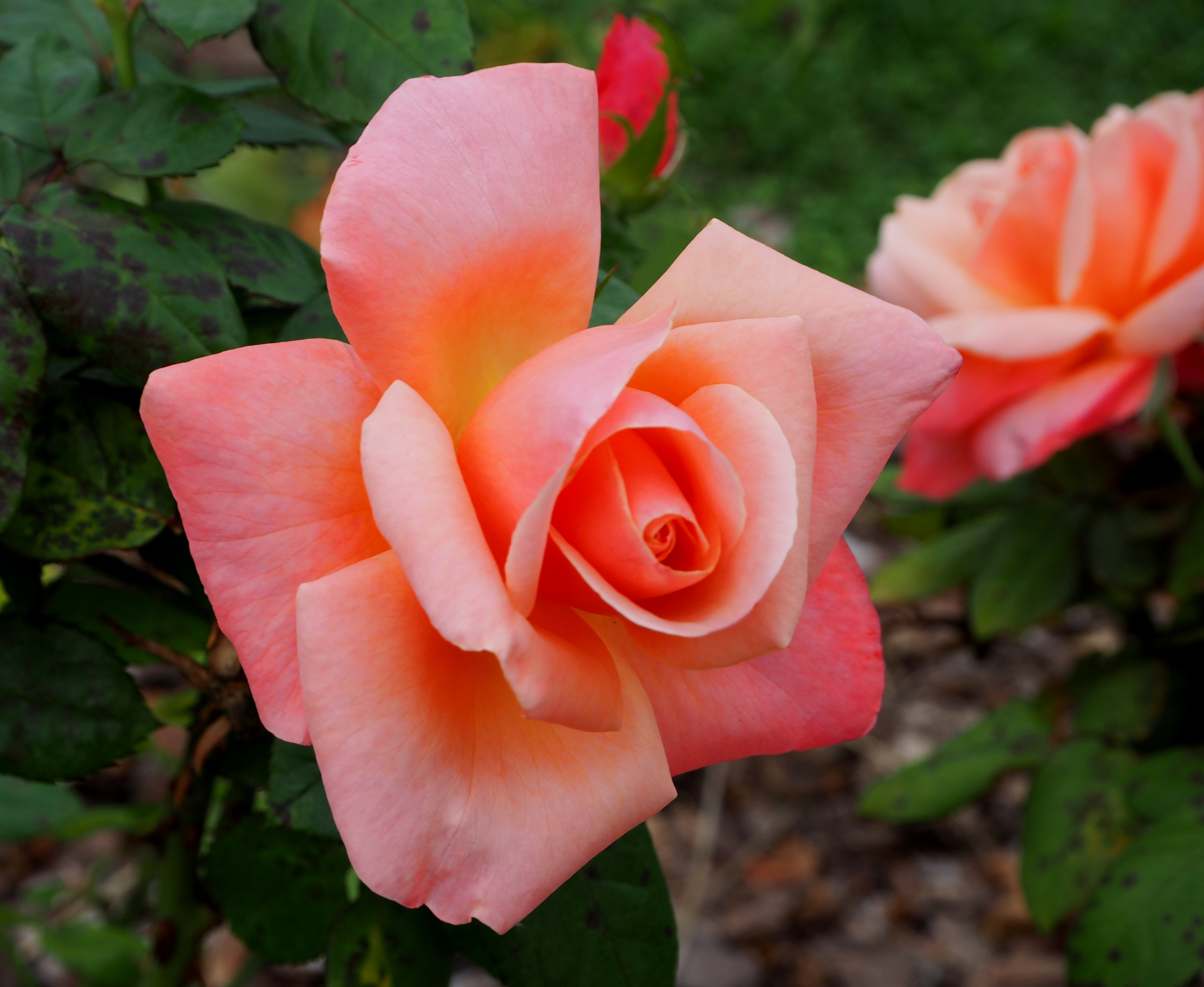
Rosa 'Silver Jubilee', 1978

Anne gained an international reputation for her outstanding rose varieties including, 'Remember Me' (1979), 'Braveheart' (1993), and 'Heart of Gold' (2001). Cocker specialised in unusually coloured and patterned rose varieties. In 1995, the Royal Caledonian Horticultural Society awarded Cocker the Scottish Horticultural Medal for outstanding services to Scottish horticulture. In 1999, Cocker was the recipient of the RNRS's most prestigious award, the Dean Hole Medal. In 2001 she was awarded The Queen Mother's Royal Warrant, thought to be the last Royal Warrant granted by the Queen Mother.

Anne died in 2014, at the age of 94. Her son, Alec Cocker Jr. and his wife, Leanne, are the current owners of the family rose business. He was awarded the Royal Warrant from Prince of Wales in 2018.

== Selected roses ==
- 'Duke of Fife (1892)
- 'Mrs. Cocker' (1899)
- 'Morning Jewell' (1968)
- 'Northern Lights' (1969)
- 'Alec's Red' (1970)
- 'Anne Cocker' (1971)
- 'Glenfiddich' (1976)
- 'Silver Jubilee' (1977)
- 'Honey Bunch' (1990)
- 'Myriam' (1991)
- 'Alison' (1996)

== Rose gallery ==
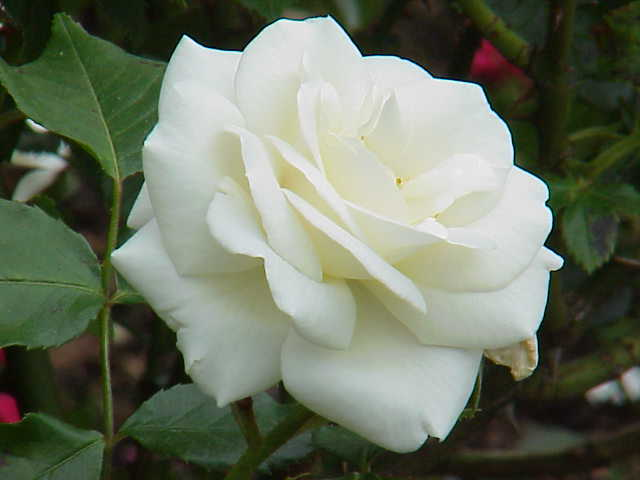
'White Cockade', (1969)

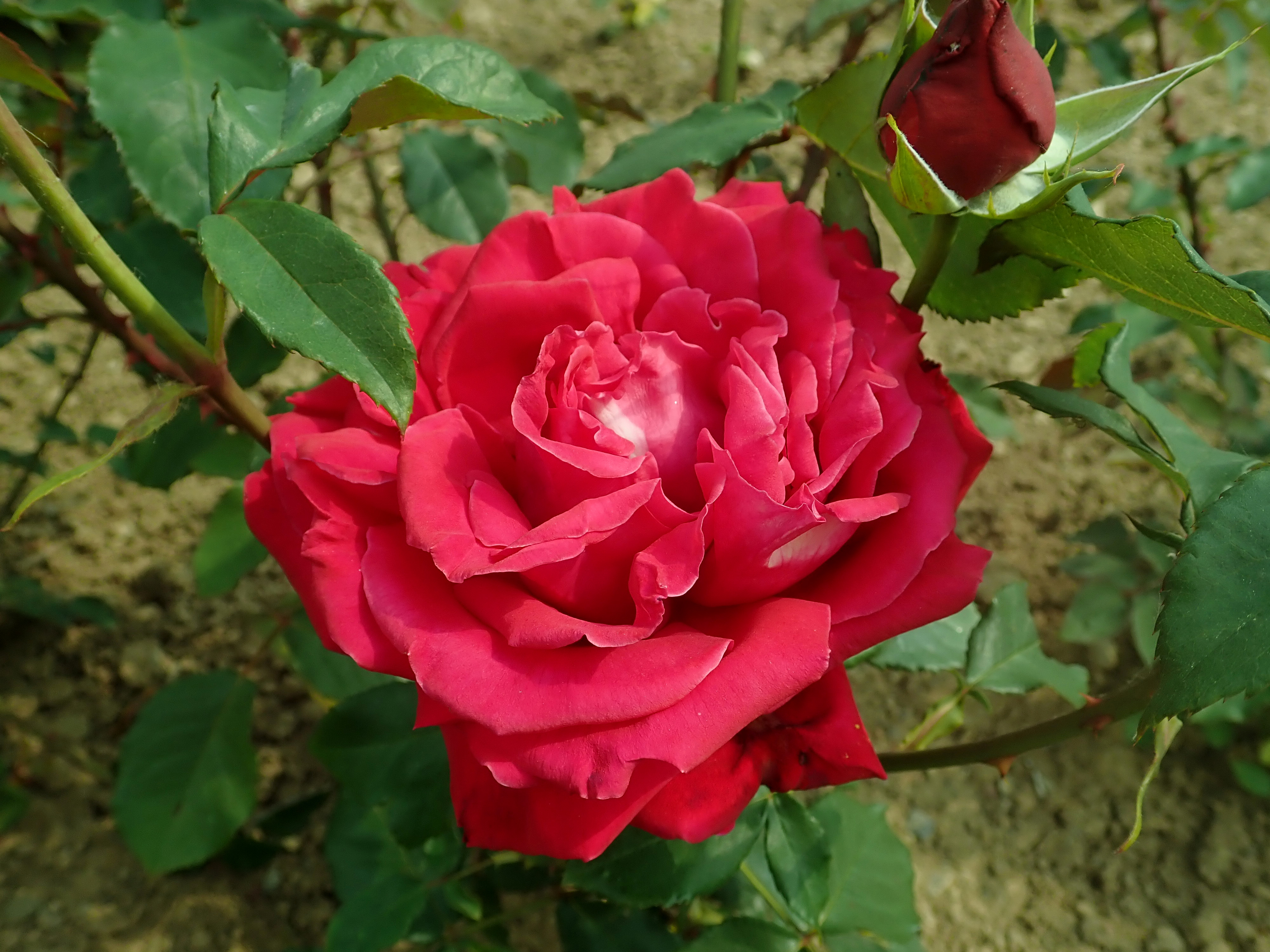
Alec's Red' (1970)

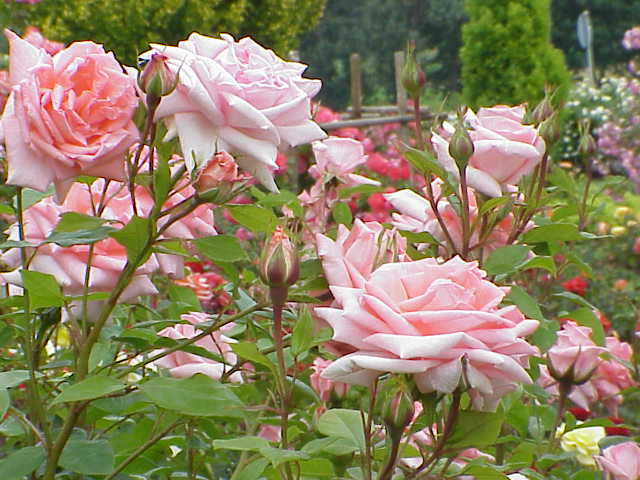
'Gloriette' (1979)

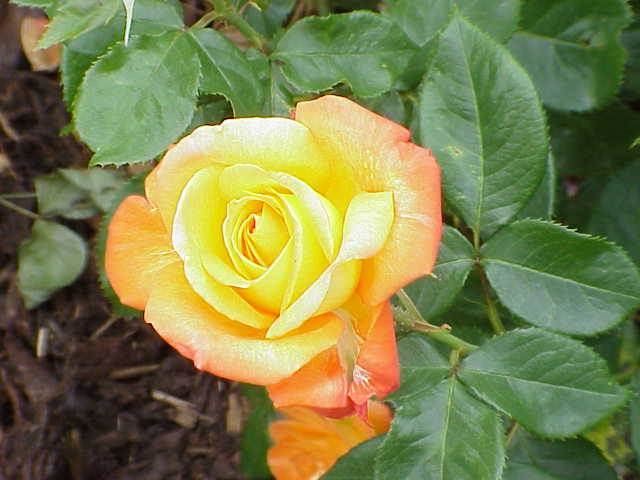
'Berliner Luft (1985)

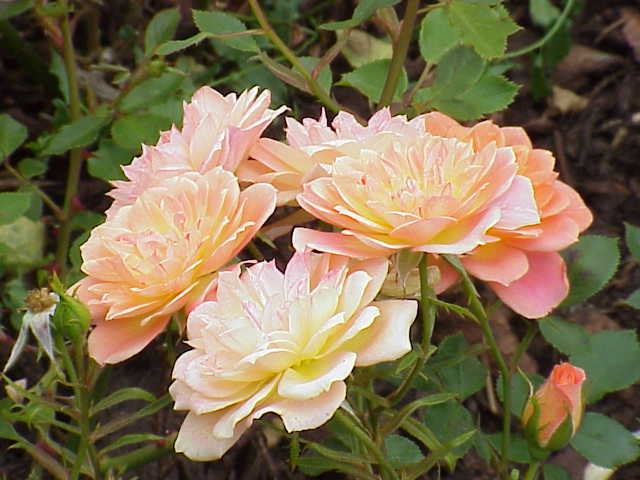
'Honey Bunch' (1990)
