= Anne Cocker =

Scottish rose hybridizer

Anne (Nan) Cocker
- Born: Anne Gowens Rennie; 25 May 1920; Aberdeen, Scotland
- Died: 21 November 2014 (aged 94); Banchory, Scotland
- Other names: Nan Cocker
- Occupations: Rose breeder James Cocker & Sons
- Known for: Multi-coloured and patterned rose varieties
- Spouse: Alec Morison Cocker
- Awards: RNRS Dean Hole Medal; Scottish Horticultural Medal

Anne Cocker (born Anne Gowen Rennis; 25 May 1920 – 21 November 2014) was a Scottish rose breeder from Aberdeen, Scotland. Cocker and her husband, Alexander Morison Cocker, were owners of the nursery, James Cocker & Sons. From the 1960s to the 2000s, the Cockers introduced more than 100 new rose varieties. Cocker continued to breed roses until her eighties, winning multiple horticultural awards.

== Early life ==
Cocker was born on 25 May 1920, in a tenement in Aberdeen, Scotland, the daughter of John and Barbara Rennie. Her father worked as a granite mason and draughtsman. Cocker attended Aberdeen Grammar School, while also working at Milne's licensed grocers. After graduating from school, she was hired full-time at the grocers. At the beginning of World War II, Cocker joined the Civil Defence Service, serving as an ambulance driver. Through her volunteer work, she met Alexander Morrison Cocker, a fellow Civil Defense Service volunteer, and the owner of James Cocker & Sons, an Aberdeen nursery. They later became engaged, and after the war formed a new nursery business using Cocker's £80 war grant. The couple delayed their marriage until 1952, waiting until their new company was thriving. Cocker and Alec expanded their business in 1959, when they bought a larger property on the outskirts of Aberdeen.

== Rose breeding ==
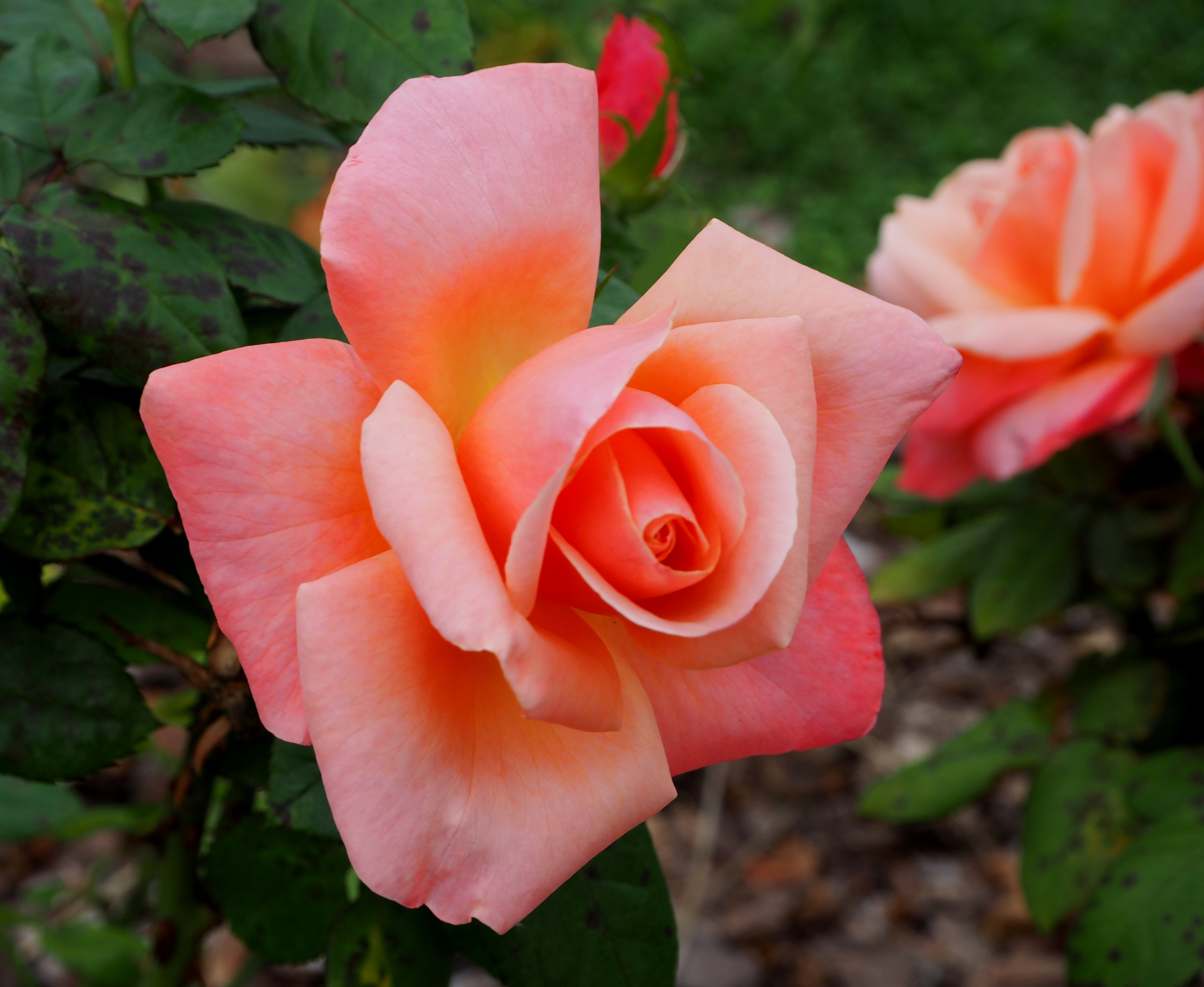
Rosa 'Silver Jubilee', 1978

In the early 1960s, the Cockers decided to specialise in the breeding and growing of new rose varieties. Their early rose breeding successes include, 'Morning Jewel' (1968), 'Rosy Mantle' (1968) and 'White Cockade' (1969). The bright red hybrid tea rose, 'Alec's Red' (1970), won the Royal National Rose Society's (RNRS) President's International Trophy in 1970. In 1976, Alec was granted a Royal Warrant as supplier of the Queen's bare root roses. Alec's most famous new rose variety, 'Silver Jubilee', was named with permission of the Queen to celebrate her 25-year reign. Anne introduced the new rose variety in 1978, the year after Alec died of a heart attack. After Alec's death, she assumed sole ownership of the nursery, later expanding the business. She continued to develop new rose varieties well into her eighties.

Cocker won awards for her successful new rose varieties. She inherited Alec's Royal Warrant, and later served as president of the Aberdeen Association of Royal Warrant Holders. Cocker earned an international reputation for her roses, including 'Remember Me' (1979), 'Braveheart' (1993), and 'Heart of Gold' (2001). Cocker specialised in unusually coloured and patterned rose varieties. Her work had a major influence on Tom Carruth, an American, award-winning rose hybridizer.

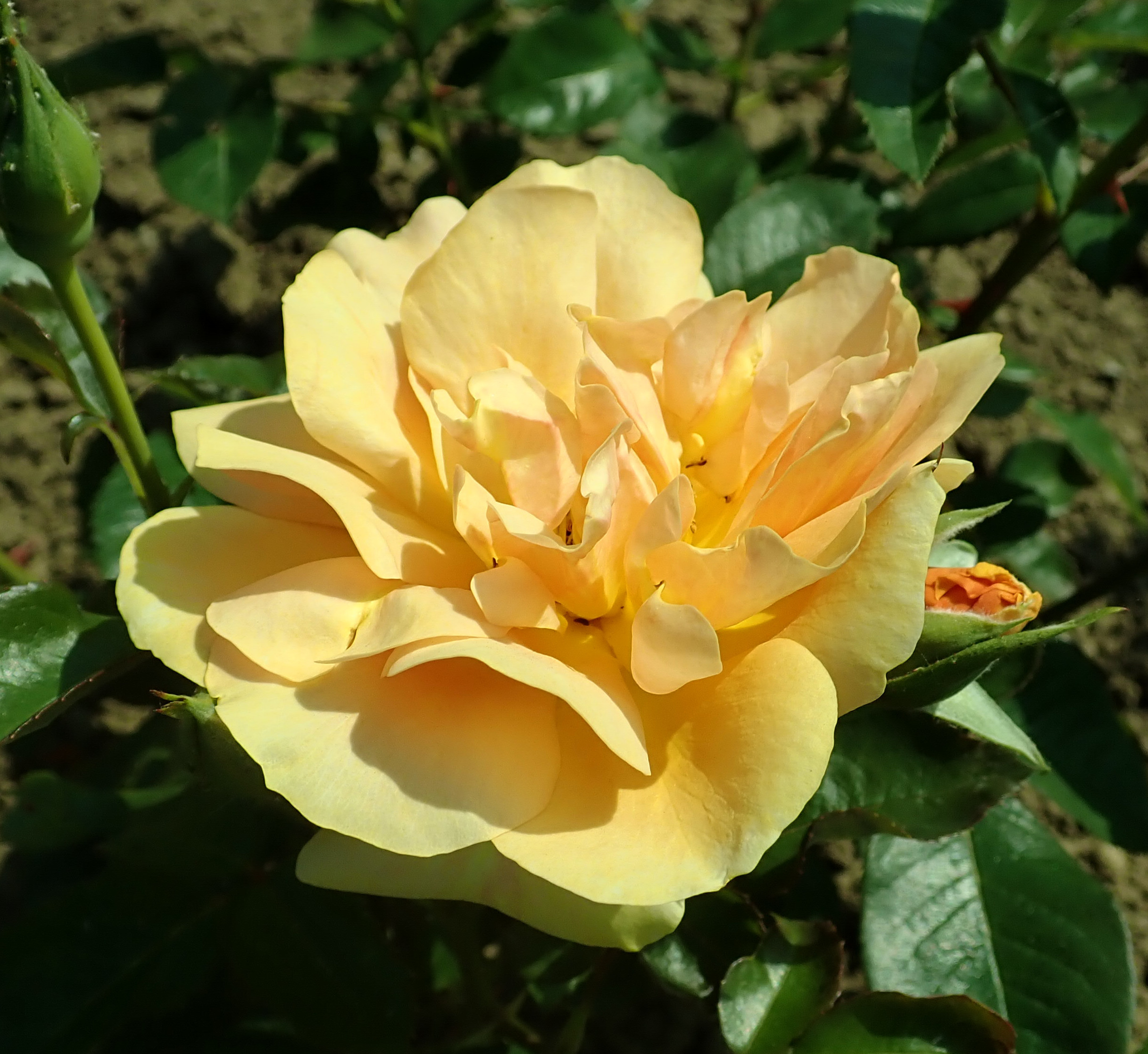
Rosa 'Alison', 1996

Cocker was appointed Burgess of the Guild of Aberdeen in 1983. In 1995, the Royal Caledonian Horticultural Society awarded Cocker the Scottish Horticultural Medal for outstanding services to Scottish horticulture. In 1999, Cocker was the recipient of the RNRS's most prestigious award, the Dean Hole Medal. In 2001 she was awarded the Queen Mother's Royal Warrant, thought to be the last Royal Warrant granted by the Queen Mother. In 2009, Cocker was awarded the People's Choice Award, at the Glasgow International Rose Trials, for her hybrid tea rose, 'With All My Love'.

Cocker died 21 November 2014, at the age of 94, in Banchory, Scotland. Her son, Alec Cocker Jr. and wife are the current owners of the family rose business.

== Selected roses ==
- 'Coronation Gold' (1978)
- 'Remember Me' (1979)
- 'Golden Jubilee' (1981)
- 'Copper Gem' (1983)
- 'Duftes Berlin' (1988)
- 'Honey Bunch' (1990)
- 'Myriam' (1991)
- 'Braveheart' (1993)
- 'Alison' (1996)
- 'Evita' (2000)
- 'Heart of Gold' (2001)
- 'With All My Love' (2005)

== Rose gallery ==
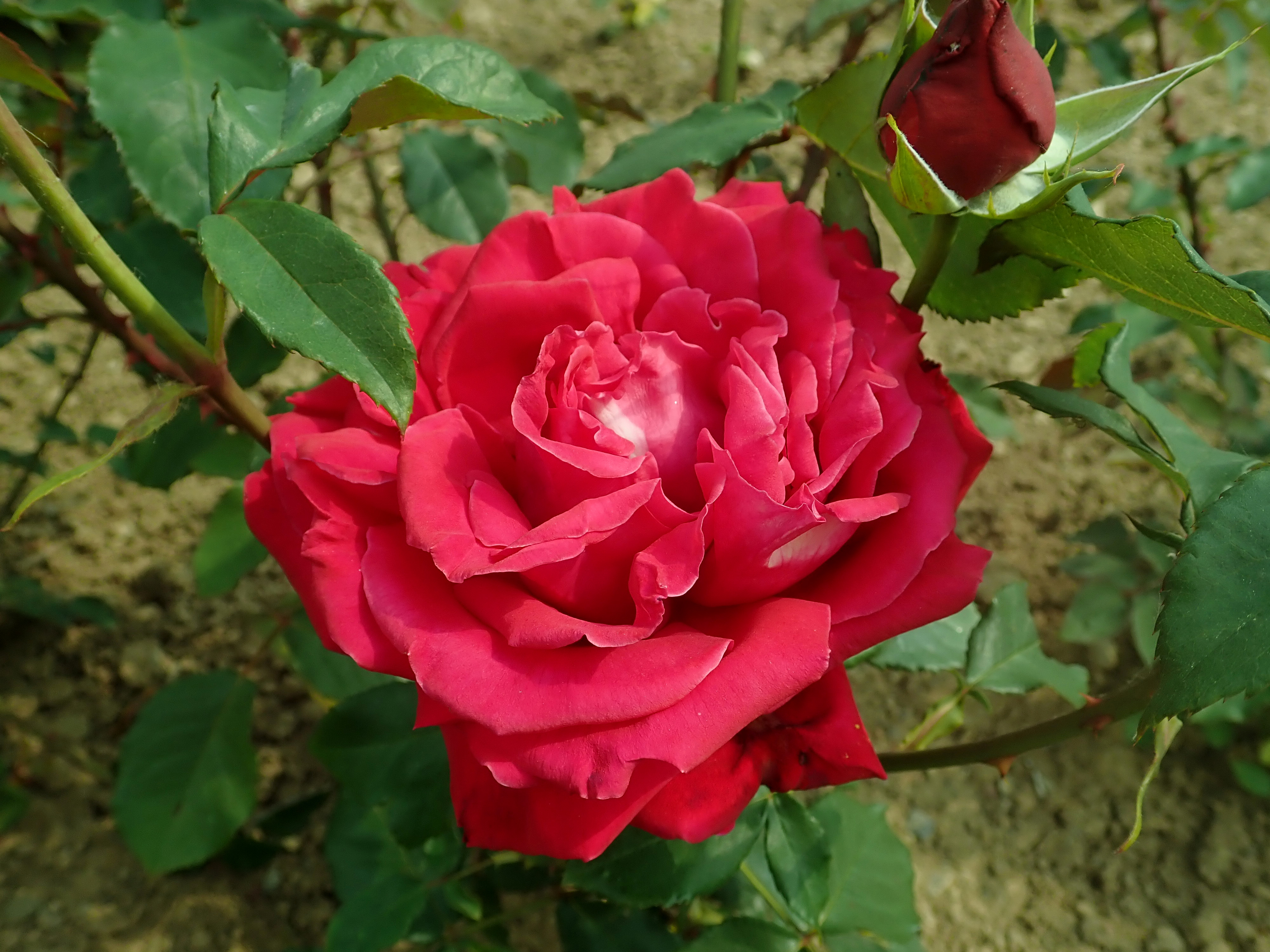
'Alec's Red' (1970)

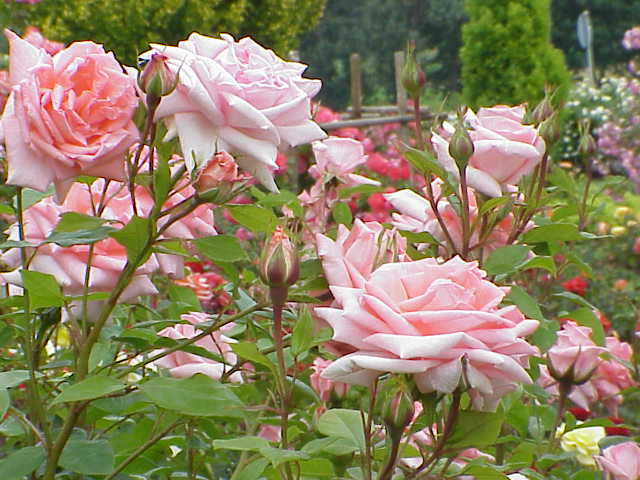
'Gloriette' (1979)

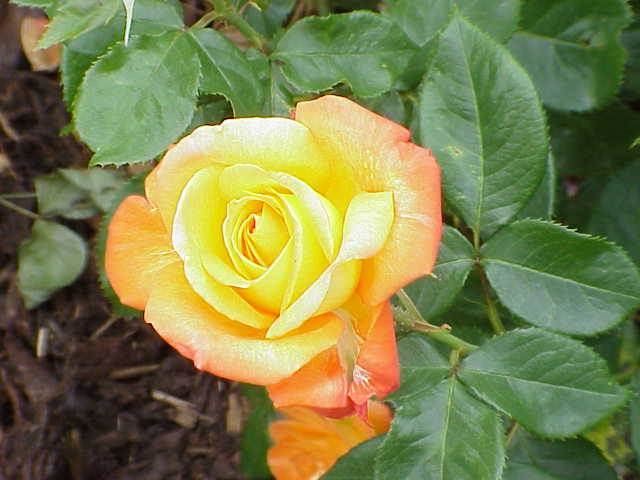
'Berliner Luft' (1985)

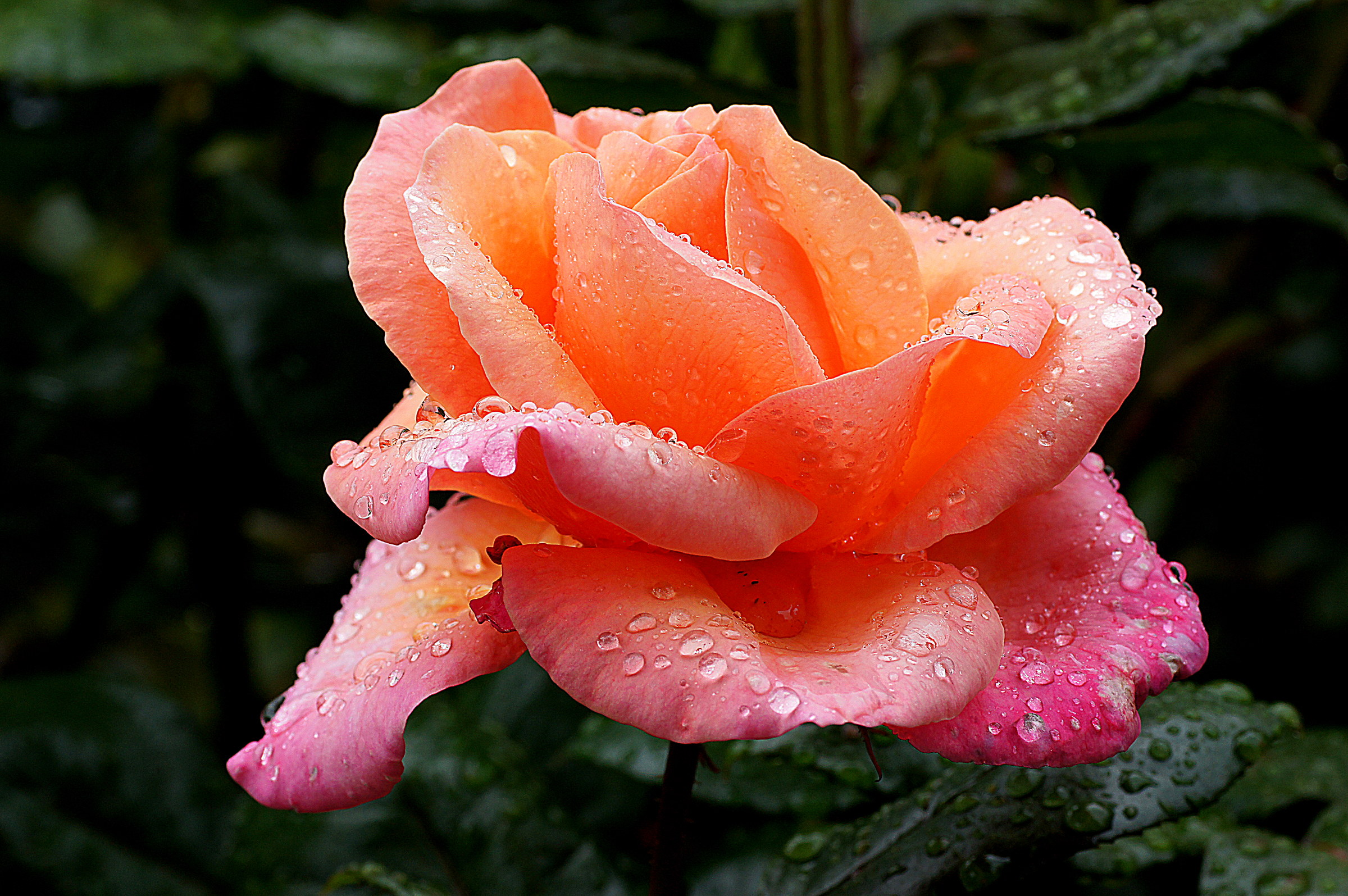
'Fyvie Castle' (1985)

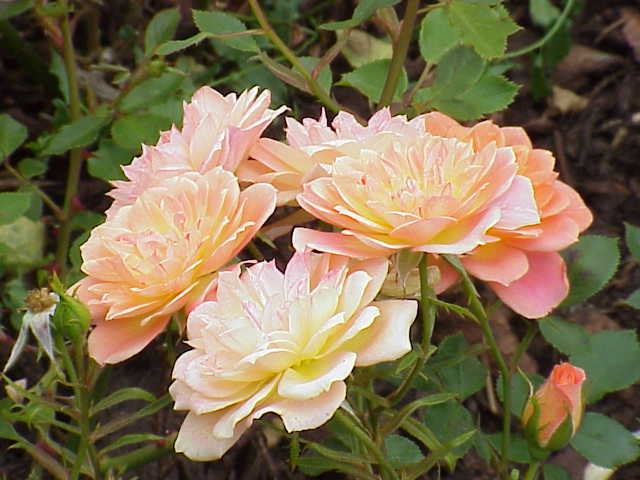
'Honey Bunch' (1990)

== See also ==
- Garden roses
- Harkness Roses
- Sam McGredy
