= Clive Farrell =

British lepidopterist and real estate developer

- Relatives: Luke Farrell (son)

Clive Farrell is a British lepidopterist and real estate developer. In 1981, Farrell established the London Butterfly House in Syon Park, West London. Farrell founded Butterfly World, Hertfordshire in 2008, the largest butterfly education and conservation center. Farrell owns butterfly farms in Belize, Stratford-upon-Avon, and Fort Lauderdale, Florida.
