= Royal National Rose Society Gardens =

Rose gardens in St Albans, England

Coordinates: 51.727182°N 0.371943°W

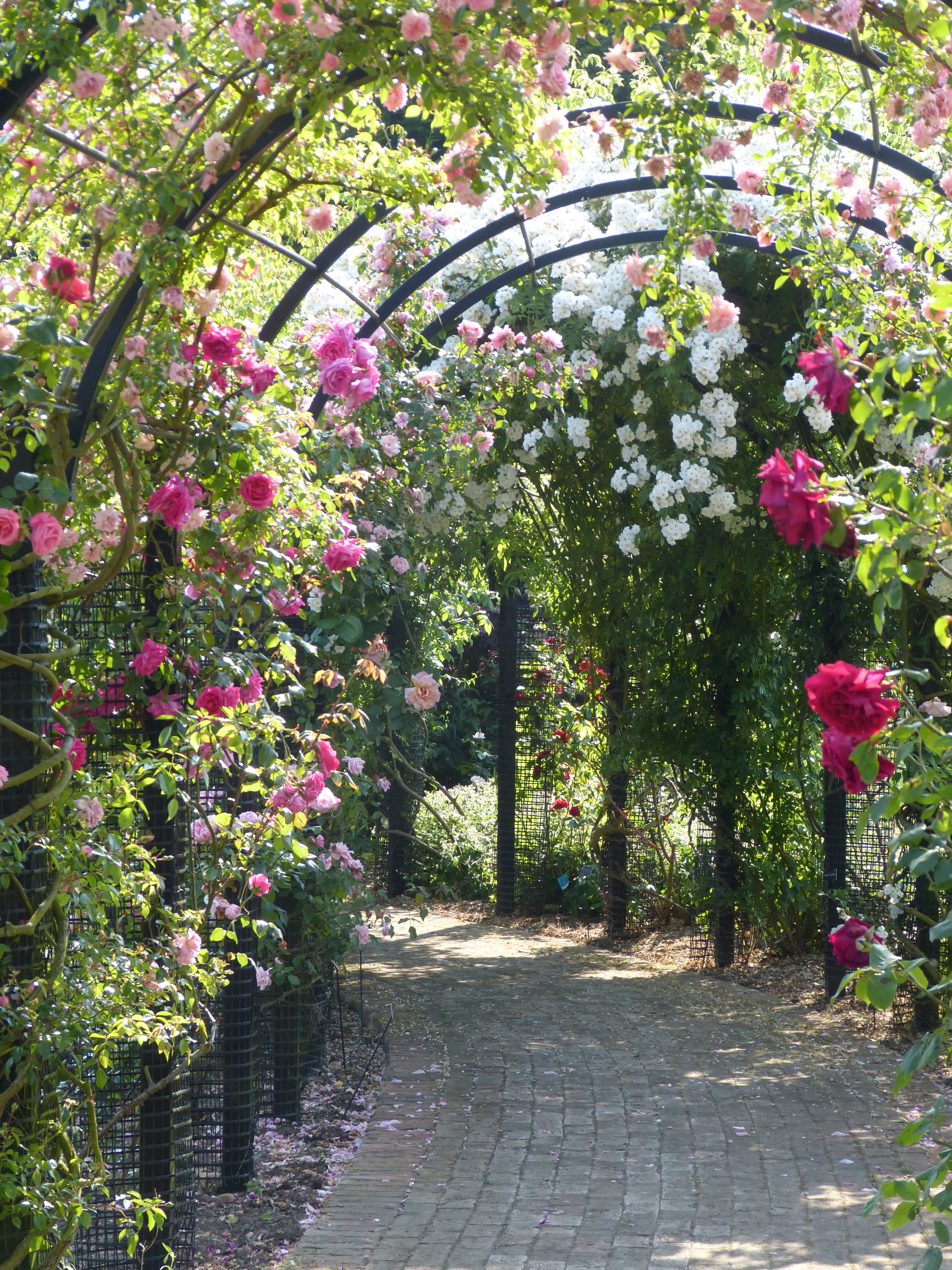
Pergola at the Gardens of the Rose

The Royal National Rose Society Gardens, also known as The Gardens of The Rose, were the gardens and headquarters of The Royal National Rose Society at Bone Hill, Chiswell Green, St Albans, Hertfordshire in the United Kingdom. The Royal National Rose Society was established in 1876 and the gardens were opened over 50 years ago by Mary, Princess Royal who was a Patron of the society at the time. The Society's stated aim was to create a "living dictionary" of roses. The gardens contain 2,500 different rose cultivars among 15,000 rose bushes.

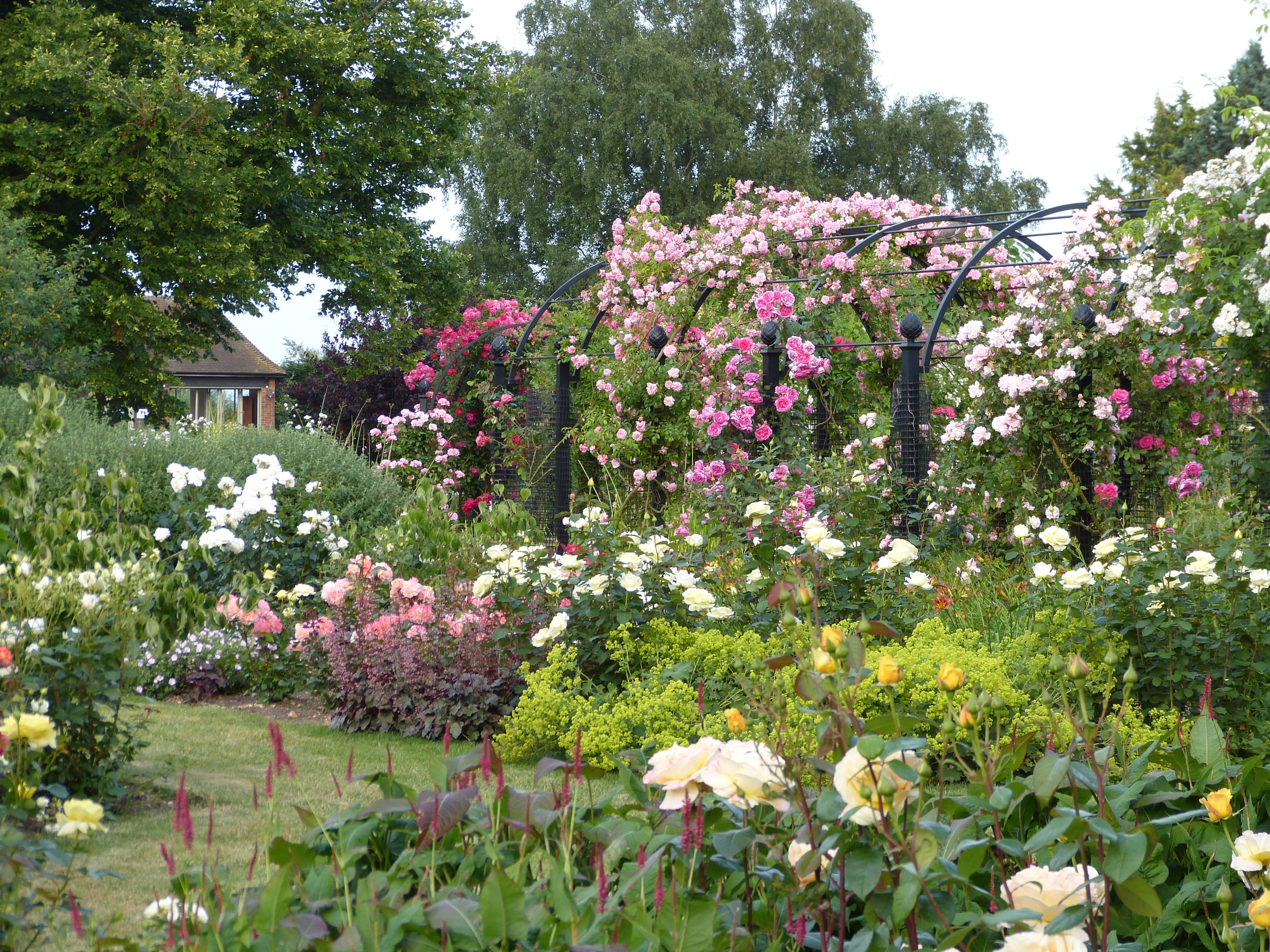
Royal National Rose Society Gardens (2013)

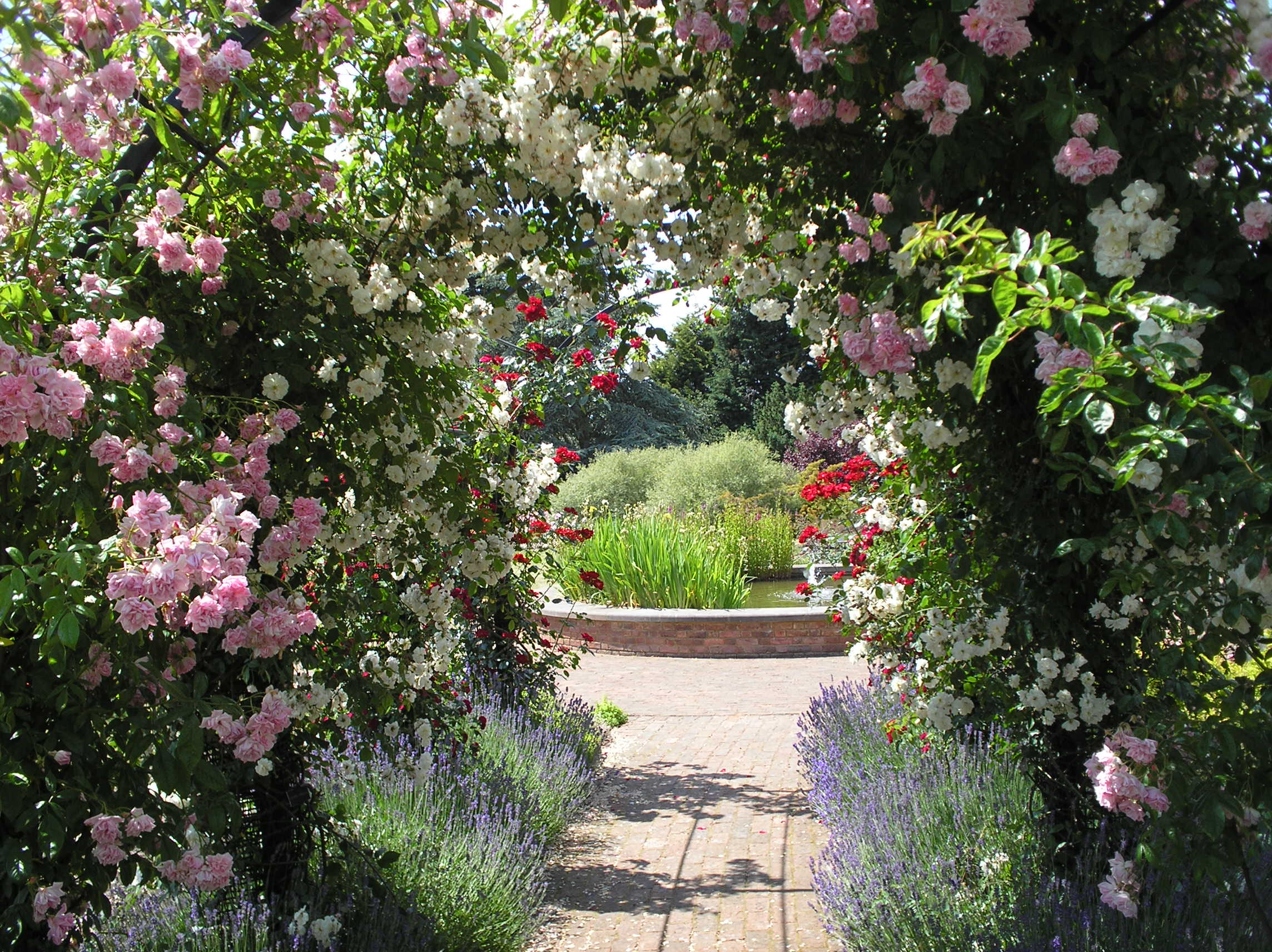
Royal National Rose Society Gardens (2010)

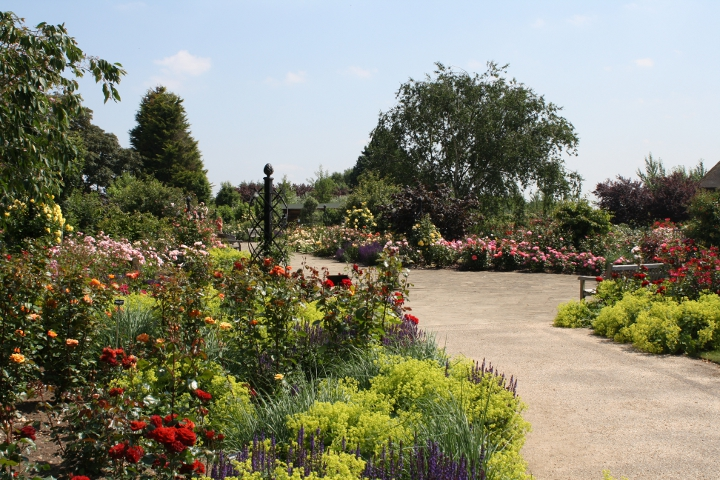
Royal National Rose Society Gardens (2013)

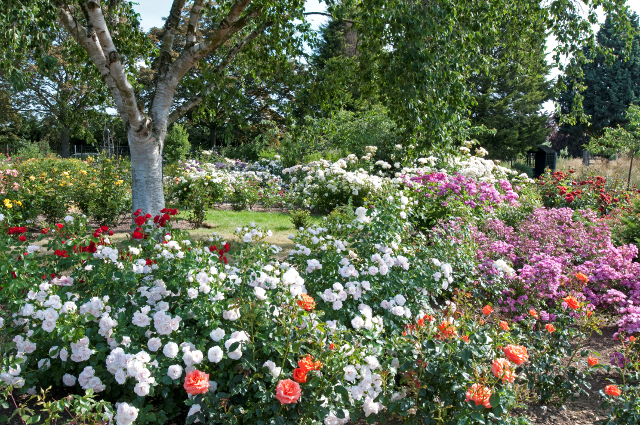
Royal National Rose Society Gardens (2010)

The Royal National Rose Society went into administration on 15 May 2017. The Gardens are permanently closed.

== Royal Entomological Society ==
The Royal Entomological Society refurbished the mansion at Bone Hill to become the society's headquarters known as Butterfly World. Following a £27 million build, the project was launched in March 2008 at an event at the Royal Society in London. In December 2015, it was closed.
