= Luke Farrell (chef) =

British chef

- Occupations: Chef and restaurateur
- Relatives: Clive Farrell (father)

Luke Farrell is a British chef and restaurateur. Farrell operates four restaurants in London specializing in Southeast Asian cuisines, including Plaza Khao Gaeng and Speedboat Bar (Thai), Viet Populaire (Vietnamese), and Bebek!Bebek! (Indonesian). Plaza Khao Gaeng is inspired by the traditional rice-curry shops of Southern Thailand. Speedboat Bar serves dishes from Bangkok's Chinatown.

Farrell also operates three tropical greenhouses growing speciality Asian produce and herbs at Ryewater Nursery, his family's 40 hectares (99 acres) farm in Dorset. The greenhouses supply produce to London restaurants, including Nahm, Som Saa, Kiln, and Ikoyi.
