= Stella Etc =

Stella Etc.
- Frankie, Peaches And Me; Extra Special Stella Etc; Sweet-talking TJ; Amber and The Hot Pepper Jelly; Twists, Turns and 100% Tilda; Forever and Ever and Evie; Truly, Madly Megan; Meet the Real World, Rachel
- Author: Karen McCombie
- Illustrator: Spike Gerrell
- Country: United Kingdom
- Genre: Children's novel
- Publisher: Scholastic
- Media type: Print (paperback)
- Preceded by: Ally's World

Stella Etc. is a children's book series by British author Karen McCombie. It was published between 2004 and 2007, with an omnibus edition published in 2010.

The series is about a girl called Stella, her family and her friends. After moving from London, Stella lives in the seaside town of Portbay with her family, including twin brothers Jamie (who bites) and Jake (who has ginger hair). Stella is a friendly girl who is always ready to give people a chance, no matter what they have been like in the past. She is always on the lookout for possible new friends, and one new friend is added to the group in each book. Stella has brown hair and freckles and a stutter that comes and goes.

Peaches, a strange ginger cat, wanders through the series, giving Stella mysterious signs and bringing the scent of peaches and cream.

Throughout the series, Stella uncovers secrets about Joseph's House, the servant, Joseph, and his best friend, Elize Grainger.

Title	Author	Publisher	Date	Genre	Length
Frankie, Peaches and Me	Karen McCombie	Scholastic	2004	Children's novel	224 pages
Shy Stella Stansfield has moved from the bustling London to the sleepy town of Portbay, leaving her friends and crush, Seb, behind. Struggling to make friends, Stella uncovers secrets of Joseph's House, and finds a friend in a fat ginger cat, Peaches. When her best friend Frankie comes to visit, she's shocked to learn that she is going out with Seb behind her back, however the two reconcile and Stella decides Portbay isn't as bad as she originally thought.
Sweet-Talking TJ	Karen McCombie	Scholastic	2004	Children's novel	208 pages
Stella thinks she's found a friend in TJ, a short boy the same age as her. The two get on really well, but TJ's too afraid to stand up to his bully friends. TJ steals Stella's phone for a dare, and although they temporarily fall out, they later become friends when TJ leaves his 'meathead' mates.
Meet the Real World, Rachel	Karen McCombie	Scholastic	2004	Children's novel	208 pages
Mean girl Rachel Riley's world is turned upside down when she discovers she has epilepsy. Rachel's friends turn against her and go out of her way to make her life a misery. Although Rachel's never been nice to her, Stella feels sympathy towards her and tries to befriend her, against TJ's wishes. Although Rachel struggles to get out of her bitchy habits, with Stella and TJ's help, she comes to terms with her epilepsy.
Truly, Madly, Megan	Karen McCombie	Scholastic	2005	Children's novel	208 pages
Stella, TJ and Rachel befriend the crazy Megan, who's on holiday with her family (although Rachel is at first reluctant). Megan takes the blame for stuff her wildchild older sister, Naomi, does. Stella and the gang discover that Megan's older sister is secretly going out with Si, Rachel's cool older brother, and drinking underage with him. Naomi blames Megan for drinking when their parents find a bottle of cider in her bag. Megan is banned from hanging out with Stella etc., however, with their help, she proves to her parents that Naomi's been lying to them.
Amber and the Hot Pepper Jelly	Karen McCombie	Scholastic	2005	Children's novel	208 pages
Stella and the shy waitress Amber share a friendly moment and Stella thinks she may have found a new member of Stella Etc. But Amber seems to be hot and cold. She tells lies of illnesses she apparently has, much to Rachel's anger, who has an illness herself. Amber later reveals she told her family she had a date to a wedding she's been invited to, and Stella and the gang accept her as their friend. Rachel provides her brother, Si, as Amber's date. Also in the story, the Shingle Cafe is renamed to the Hot Pepper Jelly.
Twists, Turns and 100% Tilda	Karen McCombie	Scholastic	March 2006	Children's novel	224 pages
Stella and the gang find spooky notes all over town and think that the people behind them could be Tilda and Si. They find out they're right. None of the gang particularly want to befriend Tilda except Stella, who's always willing to give people a chance. Tilda is jealous of Amber, thinking she has a crush on Si. They later accept Tilda as their friend.
Forever and Ever and Evie	Karen McCombie	Scholastic	February 2007	Children's novel	224 pages
Stella visits London in the holidays and catches up with all her old friends. However, things are awkward when Stella sets off to search for her granddad and Frankie's boyfriend and Stella's ex-crush, Seb, wants to help. Stella grows more and more apart from her friends as she spends more time with Seb and texts her Portbay friends. Frankie grows cold towards Stella; it's later revealed she thinks Seb fancies Stella. The two have a massive argument similar to the one at the start of the series. They make friends again after Stella proves Seb doesn't fancy her. Stella also finds her granddad.
Extra Special Stella Etc	Karen McCombie	Scholastic	September 2010	Children's novel	432 pages
Omnibus edition: two novels in one. Stella and her family have just moved from buzzy London to the sleepy seaside town of Portbay. Not only has she had to leave her best mate Frankie behind but she's also kissed goodbye to the only guy she's ever liked.
