= Butterfly World, Hertfordshire =

Butterfly World Project
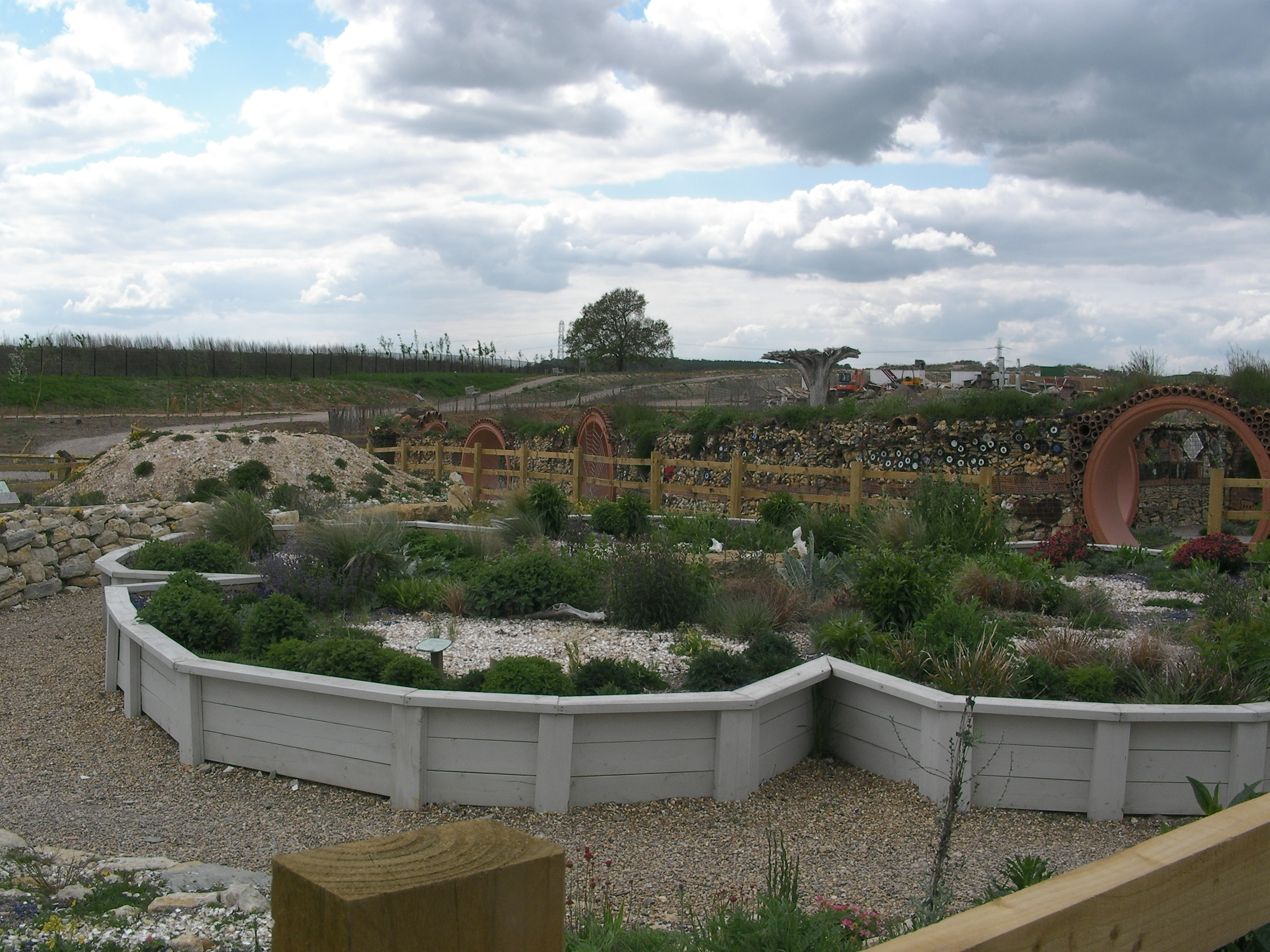
- Interactive map of Butterfly World Project
- 51°43′37″N 00°22′07″W
- Date opened: 2009
- Date closed: 2015
- Location: Chiswell Green, St Albans, England
- Land area: 27 acres (11 ha)
- Memberships: Butterfly World Trust dead link
- Major exhibits: Tropical Butterfly House, Ant World, Insect Study
- Website: Butterfly World Project links to online gambling

The Butterfly World Project was a visitor attraction in the village of Chiswell Green, on the outskirts of St Albans in Hertfordshire, UK, dedicated to showcasing and promoting learning about butterflies. It closed permanently in 2015.

== History ==
The project was started by lepidopterist Clive Farrell, and was launched in 2008 at the Royal Society in London. Farrell secured a number of high-profile patrons for the scheme, including naturalists Sir David Attenborough and Professor David Bellamy, gardener and broadcaster Alan Titchmarsh, actress Emilia Fox, and barrister and politician Baroness Helena Kennedy.

Construction began at the site at Chiswell Green, adjacent to the Gardens of the Rose, in 2009. Terra Firma landscape architects worked with client Clive Farrell, artist and garden designer Ivan Hicks and Chrysalis Architects on the project masterplan and detailed proposals.

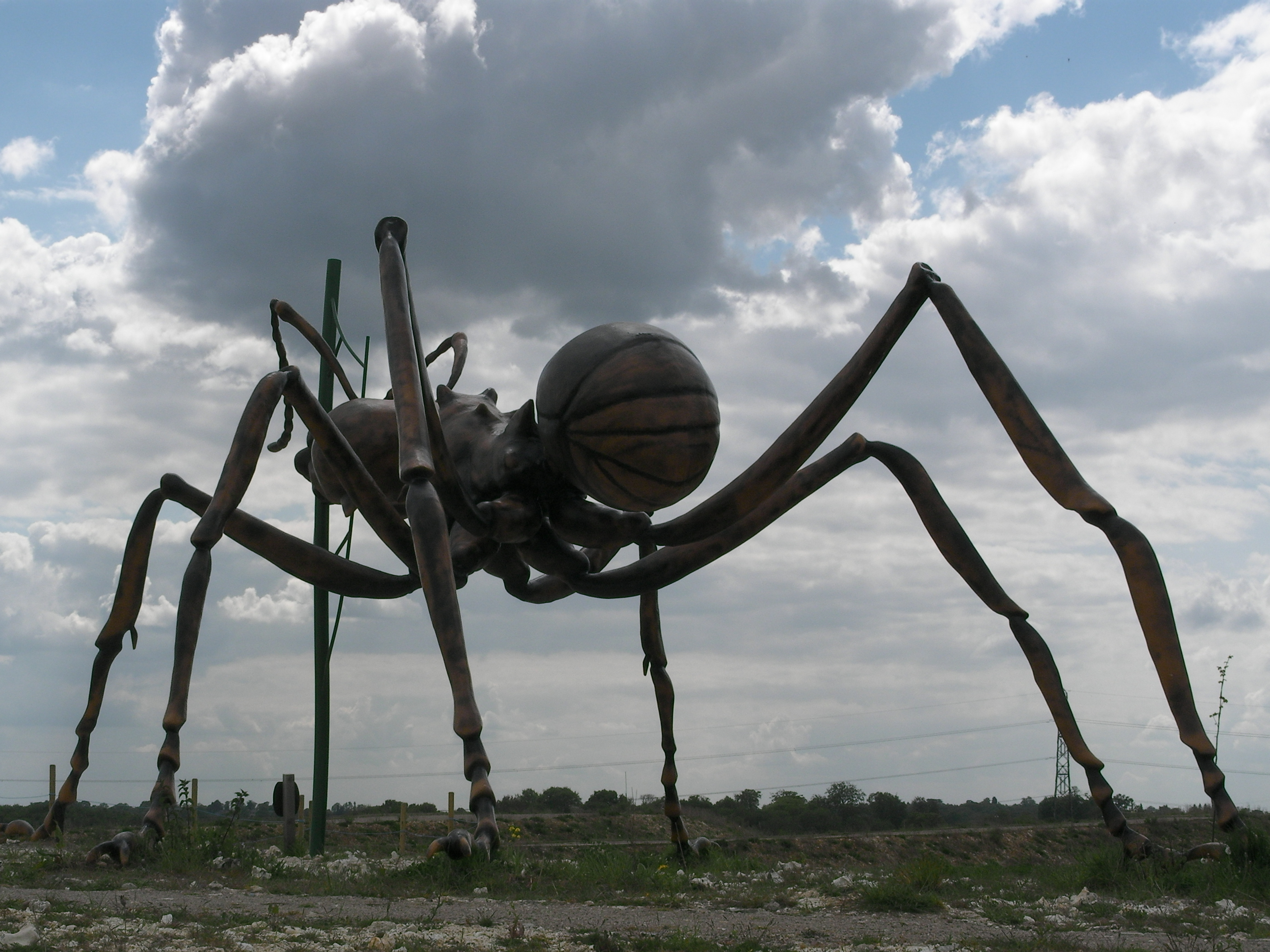
A giant ant sculpture at the park

The Butterfly World site opened to the public in spring 2009. The site comprised a butterfly-shaped chalk garden, wildflower meadows designed to provide a habitat for butterflies, a shop, cafe and plant boutique.

In phase 2, a breeding centre was opened, together with an artificial lake in the shape of a chrysalis, a study centre, picnic areas and a children's play area. The cafe and visitor centre was also enlarged and upgraded. 250,000 sunflowers were planted in the field that would have eventually hosted the rainforest biome.

Plans for the third phase of development included the opening of a leafcutter ant exhibition, as well as expansion of the children's play area and a redevelopment of the butterfly house and designer gardens. The final phase of development would have seen the construction of a 100-metre-wide rainforest biome, which would have provided a habitat for butterflies as well as hummingbirds, insects, spiders and tropical plants. The biome was planned to include a public walkway, caves and watercourses, but was never built.

On 14 December 2015 the owners, Breheny Construction, announced that the project would close permanently.
