= Chiswell Green =

Village in Hertfordshire, England

Coordinates: 51.7277°N 0.3580°W

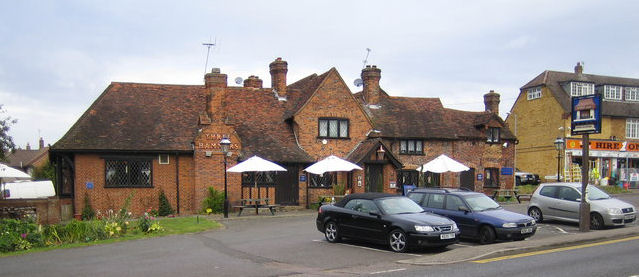
- The Three Hammers, Chiswell Green

- Location within Hertfordshire
- Population: 2,802
- OS grid reference: TL135045
- Civil parish: St Stephen
- District: St Albans
- Shire county: Hertfordshire
- Region: East
- Country: England
- Sovereign state: United Kingdom
- Post town: ST ALBANS
- Postcode district: AL2
- Dialling code: 01727
- Police: Hertfordshire
- Fire: Hertfordshire
- Ambulance: East of England
- UK Parliament: St Albans

Chiswell Green is a village, on the southern outskirts of St Albans, in the parish of St Stephen and district of the City of St Albans in Hertfordshire. It has a population of approximately 2,800.

It is located on the North Orbital Road, close to Junction 21A of the M25, and is separated from much of (the rest of) the St Albans urban area by the A414.

To the south east of Chiswell Green is Park Street, and to the south, Bricket Wood.

There is one pub in Chiswell Green, The Three Hammers. There is one school in West Avenue: Killigrew Primary and Nursery School. This was formed by the amalgamation of two separate schools.

Originally positioned on Old Watford Road around The Three Turnips public house, Chiswell Green was much extended between the wars and shortly afterwards. It now is a medium-sized suburb.

== Locality ==
Nearby places outside the district include Hatfield to the east, Welwyn Garden City to the northeast, Luton and Dunstable to the northwest, Hemel Hempstead to the west, Watford to the southwest and Borehamwood to the south.

== Royal National Rose Society Gardens ==
The Royal National Rose Society Gardens (formerly the Gardens of the Rose) were the headquarters of The Royal National Rose Society located at Chiswell Green. The gardens contained thousands of rose varieties and was normally open to the public. They were closed for four years while the landscape gardener Michael Balston remodelled them. They reopened in June 2007 but however closed in 2017 when the Society went into administration.

== Royal Entomological Society ==
The Royal Entomological Society moved its headquarters to the Mansion House on Chiswell Green lane in 2007 from Queen's Gate in Central London, the society is "devoted to the promotion and development of entomological science".
