= Karen McCombie =

Scottish writer

- Born: Aberdeen, Scotland, U.K.

Website
- karenmccombie.com

Karen McCombie is a Scottish author of children's books and young adult novels. McCombie has published more than 100 books. In 2021, Waterstones described her as "one of children's fiction's most accomplished authors".

== Life ==
McCombie was born in Aberdeen, Scotland. Growing up, her favorite book series was Laura Ingalls Wilder's Little House series. McCombie wrote her first book at age 34, at which time she was working as a magazine journalist.

== Series ==
=== Ally's World ===
1. The Past, the Present and the Loud, Loud Girl. Scholastic. 2001. ISBN 9780439998680.
2. Dates, Double Dates and Big, Big Trouble
3. Butterflies, Bullies and Bad, Bad Habits
4. Friends, Freak-outs and Very Secret Secrets
5. Boys, Brothers and Jelly-Belly Dancing
6. Sisters, Super-creeps and Slushy, Gushy Love Songs
7. Parties, Predicaments and Undercover Pets
8. Tattoos, Tell-tales and Terrible, Terrible Twins
9. Mates, Mysteries and Pretty Weird Weirdness
10. Daisy, Dad and the Huge, Small Surprise
11. Rainbows, Rowan and True, True Romance (?)
12. Visitors, Vanishings and Va-Va-Va Voom
13. Crushes, Cliques and the Cool, School Trip
14. Hassles, Heart-pings!, and Sad, Happy Endings
15. Sunshine, Sunburn And Not-So-Sweet-Nothings (Summer special)
16. Angels, Arguments and a Furry, Merry Christmas (Christmas special, prequel to main series)

Plus:

1. A Guided Tour of Ally's World
2. My V. Groovy Ally's World Journal

=== Stella Etc. ===
1. Frankie, Peaches and Me
2. Sweet-Talking TJ
3. Meet The Real World, Rachel
4. Truly, Madly Megan
5. Amber and the Hot Pepper Jelly
6. Twists, Turns and 100% Tilda
7. Forever and Ever and Evie

=== Indie Kidd ===
1. How to be Good(ish)
2. Oops, I Lost My Best(est) Friends
3. Being Grown-Up Is Cool (Not)
4. Are We Having Fun Yet? (Hmm?)
5. Wow, I’m a Gazillionaire! (I Wish...)
6. My Big (Strange) Happy Family
7. Me and the School (un)Fair
8. I Spy a (Not So) White Lie

Specials:

1. My (Most Excellent) Pet Project
2. Indie Kidd's (Most Excellent) Best Friend Guide
3. Indie Kidd's (Most Excellent) Guide to Fun for Free

=== Sadie Rocks! ===
1. Happiness, And All That Stuff
2. Deep Joy, Or Something Like It
3. It's All Good (In Your Dreams)
4. Smile! It's Meant To Be Fun

=== You, Me and Thing ===
1. The Curse of the Jelly Babies
2. The Dreaded Noodle-doodle
3. The Legend of the Loch Ness Lilo
4. The Mummy That Went Moo

=== Angels Next Door ===
1. Angels Next Door
2. Angels in Training
3. Angels Like Me

=== St Grizzle's ===
1. St Grizzle's School for Girls, Goats and Random Boys
2. St Grizzle's School for Girls, Ghosts and Runaway Grannies
3. St Grizzle's School for Girls, Geeks and Tag-along Zombies
4. St Grizzle's School for Girls, Gremlins and Pesky Guests

=== Trilogy ===
- My Funny Valentine
- Bliss...
- Wonderland

== Stand-alone novels ==
- An Urgent Message Of Wowness
- Marshmallow Magic And The Wild Rose Rouge
- The Seventeen Secrets Of The Karma Club
- The Raspberry Rules. Scholastic. 2010. ISBN 978-1-4071-1553-5.
- Six Words And A Wish
- In Sarah's Shadow
- Love is the Drug
- My Sister, the Superbitch
- The Girl Who Wasn't There. Scholastic UK. 7 August 2014. ISBN 978-1-4071-4421-4.
- Catching Falling Stars. Scholastic Fiction. 4 June 2015. ISBN 978-1-4071-5514-2.
- Little Bird Flies. Nosy Crow. 10 January 2019. ISBN 978-0-85763-951-6.
- The OMG Blog
