= Royal National Rose Society =

Specialist horticultural society in the United Kingdom

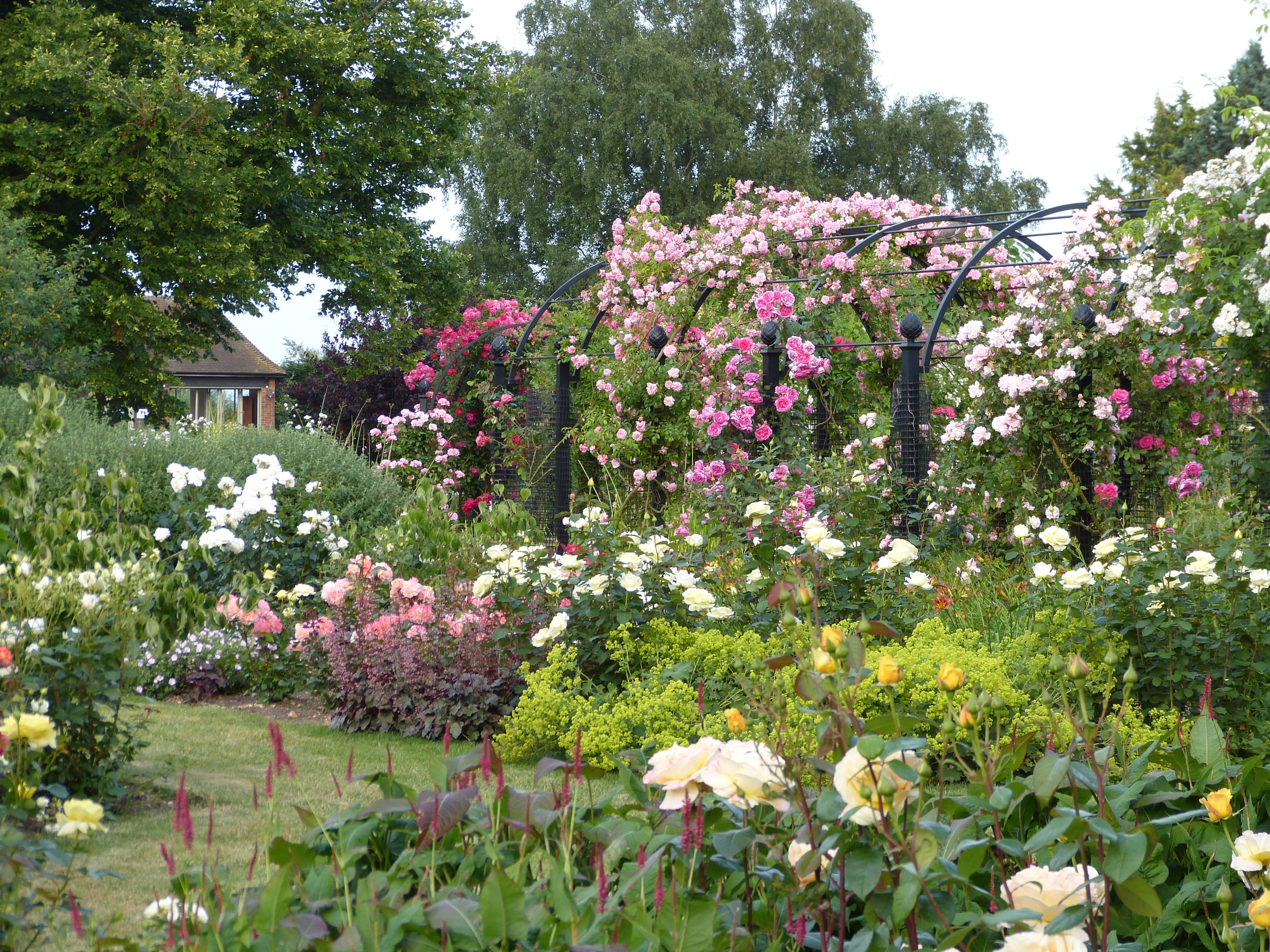
Royal National Rose Society Gardens in 2013

The Royal National Rose Society (RNRS) (1876–2017) was a specialist horticultural organization in the United Kingdom dedicated to the cultivation and appreciation of roses. Founded in 1876 as the "National Rose Society", it was the world's oldest plant society. It was a membership organisation, with members drawn from professional and amateur gardeners and horticultural businesses. Originally based in London, the rose society moved its headquarters to Chiswell Green, near St Albans, Hertfordshire in 1959, where it created the Royal National Rose Society Gardens. In 1965, the society changed its name to the "Royal National Rose Society" (RNRS). At the height of its popularity, the RNRS had 100,000 members and its gardens contained 30,000 rose shrubs. The organisation was dissolved in May, 2017 and the gardens were closed permanently.

== History ==
=== The National Rose Society ===
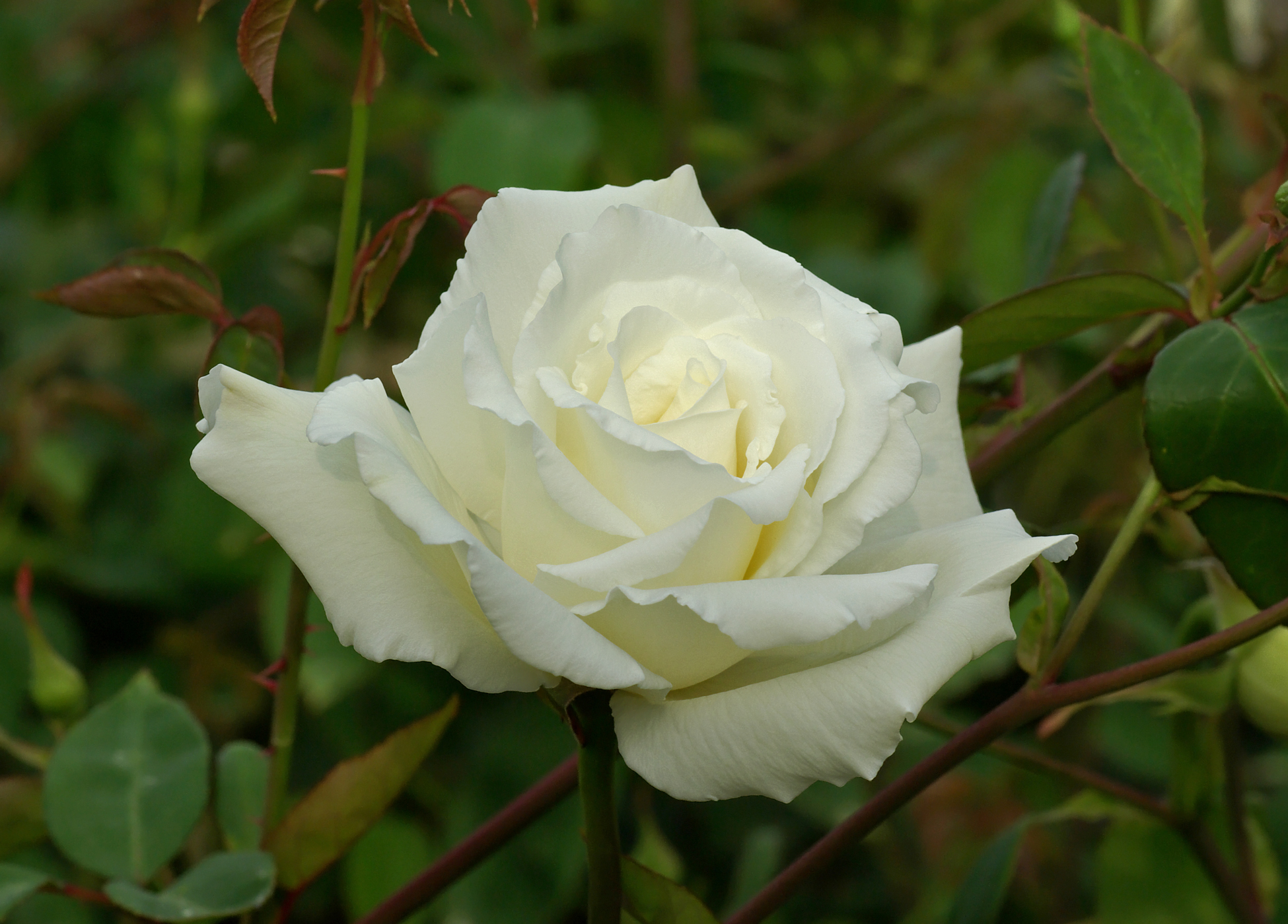
'Mrs. Herbert Stevens', 1910 Gold Medal

The Royal National Rose Society, originally named "The National Rose Society", was the inspiration of Rev Dr Reynolds Hole, an Anglican priest, author and horticulturalist. In 1858, he founded the first National Rose Show at St James's Hall on Piccadilly, London. The show was considered a great success with 2000 attendees. By 1860, the popular rose exhibition was being held at the Crystal Palace, with 16,000 rose enthusiasts in attendance.

Because of the growing interest in roses by the general public, a meeting of leading rose enthusiasts, including Rev Hole, was held on 9 December 1876, and the "National Rose Society" was created. Rev Hole was elected the society's first President. The Rev Henry Honeywood D’Ombrain was appointed the society's first Secretary. From 1877 to 1902, D'Ombrain edited the society's yearly first publication, The Rosarian's Yearbook. The organisation initially opened an office in central London. Rose exhibitions were the primary focus of the society for its first twenty-five years. It also provided advice to its members with rose related questions, such as finding a specific rose or identifying roses, as well as providing general and specific rose care advice.

=== The Gold Medal award ===
The public's growing interest in roses, specifically the new rose cultivars introduced at rose exhibitions, inspired the creation of the society's Gold Medal Award in 1883. Rose breeder and former wheat farmer, Henry Bennett, won the first and second Gold Medals awarded, with Rosa 'Her Majesty' (Hybrid Perpetual) in 1883 and Rosa 'Mrs. John Laing' (Hybrid Perpetual) in 1885. In later years, an important role of the society was to supervise trials of new rose varieties that were submitted to the society's test gardens by rose breeders from around the world. A committee of twenty judges evaluated the rose cultivars periodically throughout the season from June to September over two or three successive years. The Gold Medal was generally awarded each year to two or three roses of exceptional quality. There were several years when no roses would meet the strict guidelines for the award and no gold medal is awarded.

=== Royal patronage ===
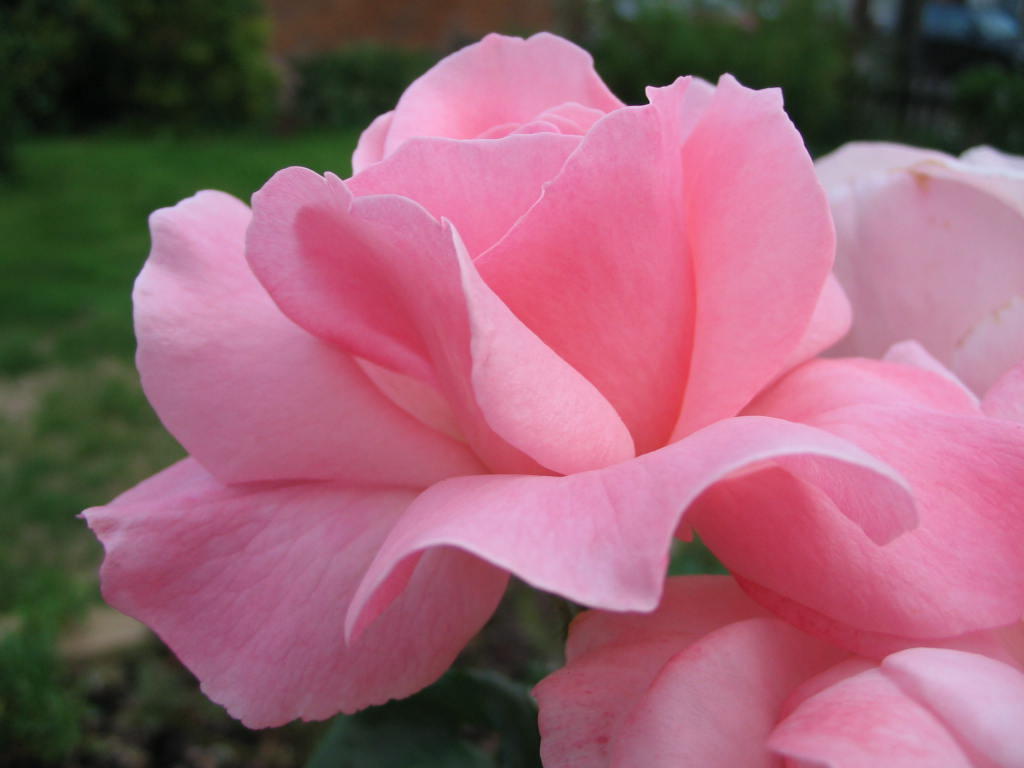
'Queen Elizabeth', 1955 Gold Medal

In acknowledgement of the Society's important work, Queen Alexandra established the first Royal Patronage in 1888. The society's membership grew steadily from 900 in 1888 to 16,000 in 1926. The annual journal sponsored by the society, The Rose Annual was first published in 1907, and was issued yearly until 1984. In 1925, Queen Mary was appointed Royal Patron of the society. Membership dropped to 11,500 during World War II, but increased to 15,000 by 1947. When Queen Mary died in 1953, the Princess Mary became the society's Royal patron.

The society's headquarters was moved from London to its new location at Bone Hill, Chiswell Green, near St Albans, Hertfordshire in 1959. The society created new rose gardens designed to accommodate the International Rose Trials at the eight-acre property. The gardens were named the Royal National Rose Society Gardens. The rose gardens grew to a collection of 30,000 rose bushes and gained an international reputation. The rose society grew quickly to 100,000 members by the 1960s. In 1965, Queen Elizabeth issued a command to add the "Royal" pretext to the society's title, and the name was changed to the "Royal National Rose Society" (RNRS). After the death of Princess Mary, the Queen Mother became the RNRS patron and held the position until her death in 2002.

=== The golden years ===
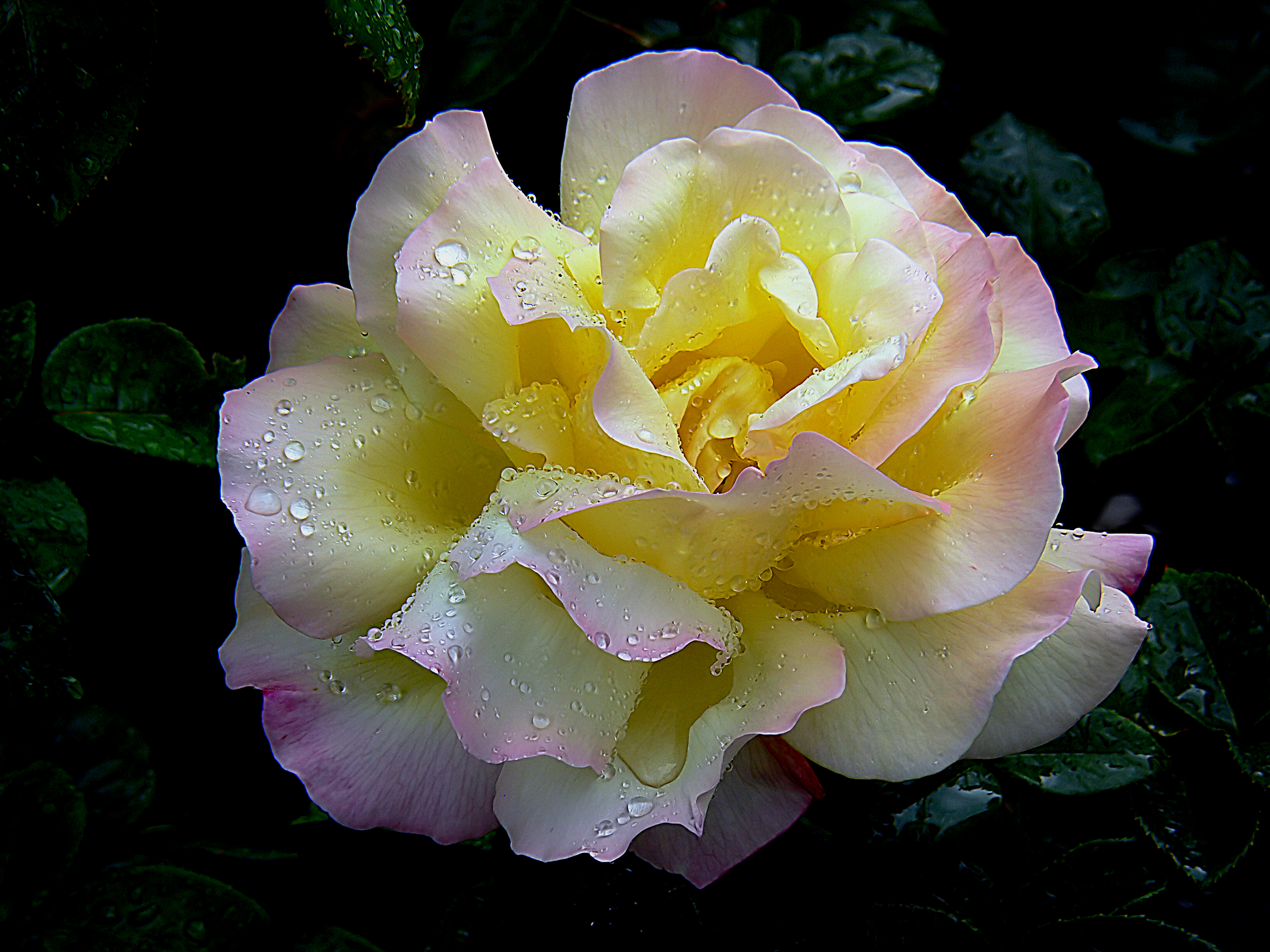
'Peace', 1947 Gold Medal

The 1960s and the 1970s were the rose society's best years. In 1968, an International Rose Conference was held by the RNRS in London. A decision was made at the conference to create a coalition of national rose societies. From that meeting, the World Federation of Rose Societies was established. In 1976 The Queen Mother attended the society's centenary reception at St. James's Palace. To celebrate the occasion, ten thousand rose boutonnières were distributed to the general public in Trafalgar Square; The Post Office in Britain issued a new commemorative set of rose stamps.

In 1978, the traditional Westminster rose exhibition was moved to St Albans, where it was refashioned into a different, updated rose show. Along with the rose exhibition, the two-day festival included live musical performances, craft fairs and trade stands. The show attracted 25,000 attendees and afterwards, the RNRS rose gardens were known as the Gardens of the Rose. Beginning in the 1990s, the public's interest in roses declined and membership numbers gradually fell, with fewer people attending the Gardens of the Rose. The society's Trustees made the decision to close the gardens and develop a new garden in 2005. The old garden was dismantled and a renovated garden was opened to the public in June, 2007. The new design included 20,000 rose cultivars with new companion plantings. The RNRS continued to struggle financially and finally dissolved the organization in May, 2017. The gardens were permanently closed.

== See also ==
- World Federation of Rose Societies
- International Rose Test Garden
- Georgiana Burton Pittock
