= Heist, Germany =

Municipality in Schleswig-Holstein, Germany

Heist
- Municipality
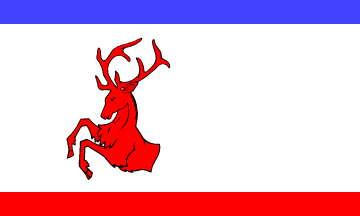
- Flag Coat of arms

- Location of Heist within Pinneberg district
- Interactive map of Heist
- Location within Germany Location within Schleswig-Holstein
- Coordinates: 53°39′N 9°39′E
- Country: Germany
- State: Schleswig-Holstein
- District: Pinneberg
- Municipal assoc.: Geest und Marsch Südholstein

Government
  - Mayor: Jürgen Neumann (CDU)

Area
  - Total: 9.96 km^{2} (3.85 sq mi)
- Elevation: 6 m (20 ft)

Population (2025-12-31)
  - Total: 3,016
  - Density: 303/km^{2} (784/sq mi)
- Time zone: UTC+01:00 (CET)
  - Summer (DST): UTC+02:00 (CEST)
- Postal codes: 25492
- Dialling codes: 04122
- Vehicle registration: PI
- Website: www.amt-moorrege.de

Heist (German pronunciation: [haɪst]) is a municipality in the district of Pinneberg, in Schleswig-Holstein, Germany.

== Geography ==
Heist is located on the Geestrand adjacent to the Haseldorfer Marsch, in which the municipality also has a share. The municipality borders Holm in the south, Hetlingen, Haseldorf and Haselau in the west, Moorrege in the north and Appen in the east.
