= Haseldorf (Amt) =

Former Amt in the district of Pinneberg, in Schleswig-Holstein, Germany

Coordinates: 53.617°N 9.600°E

Haseldorf is a former Amt ("collective municipality") in the district of Pinneberg, in Schleswig-Holstein, Germany. On 1 January 2017, it merged into the Amt Moorrege, which changed its name to Geest und Marsch Südholstein. The seat of the Amt was in Uetersen.

== Municipalities ==
The Amt Haseldorf consisted of the following municipalities:

1. Haselau
2. Haseldorf
3. Hetlingen
