= Uetersen Airfield =

Airport in Germany

Uetersen Airfield Flugplatz Uetersen-Heist
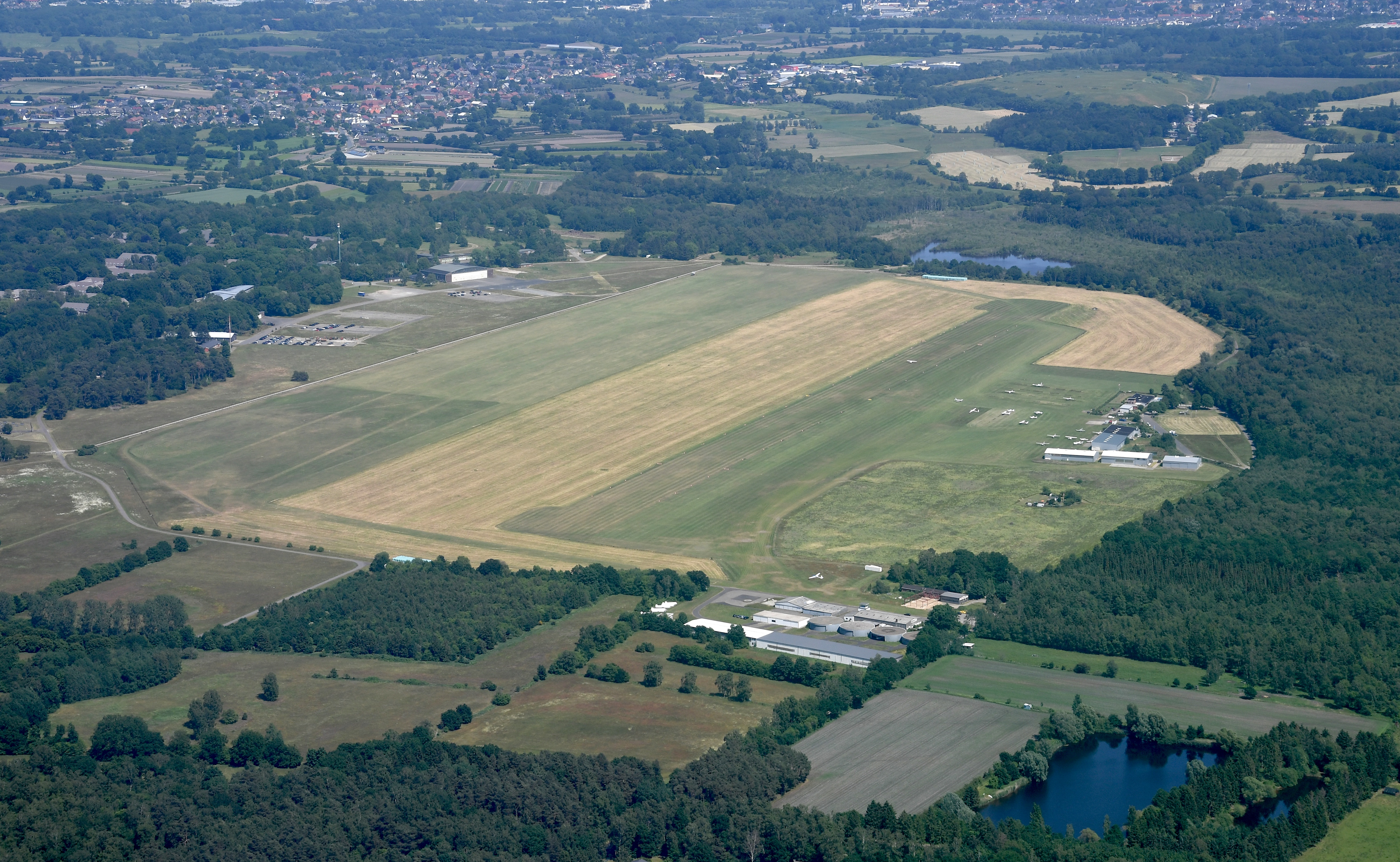
- IATA: none; ICAO: EDHE

Summary
- Airport type: Public
- Operator: Flugplatz Uetersen GmbH
- Location: Heist, Germany
- Elevation AMSL: 23 ft (7.0 m)
- Coordinates: 53°38′49″N 009°42′16″E
- Website: www.edhe.de

Map
- Location of EDHE

Runways
Direction	Length		Surface
Direction	m	ft	Surface
09/27	900	2,952	Grass
09/27	1.100	3,608	Grass

Uetersen Airfield is an aerodrome near the town of Uetersen in the district of Pinneberg within the municipalities of Heist and Appen.

== History ==
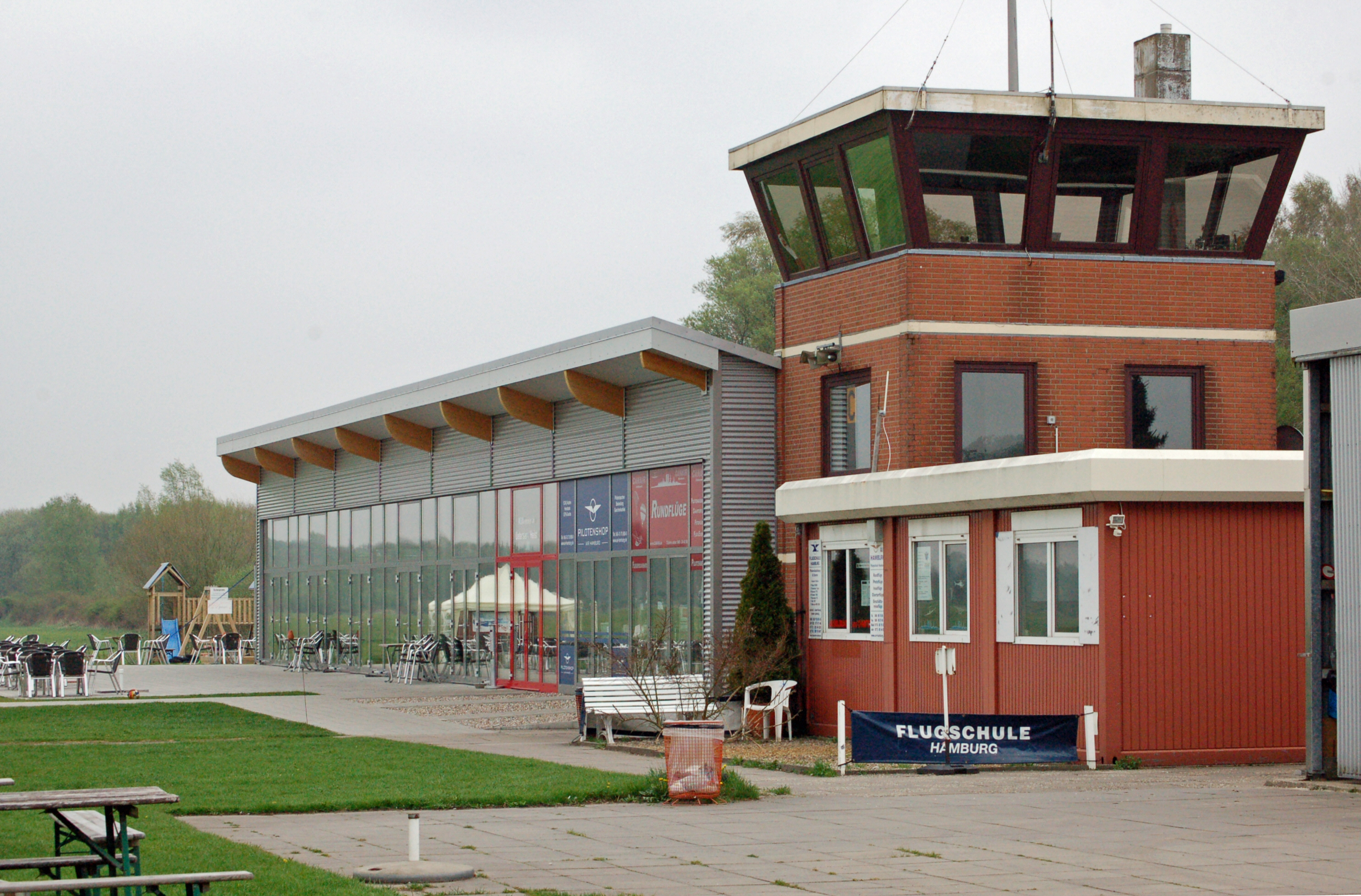
Main building and control tower

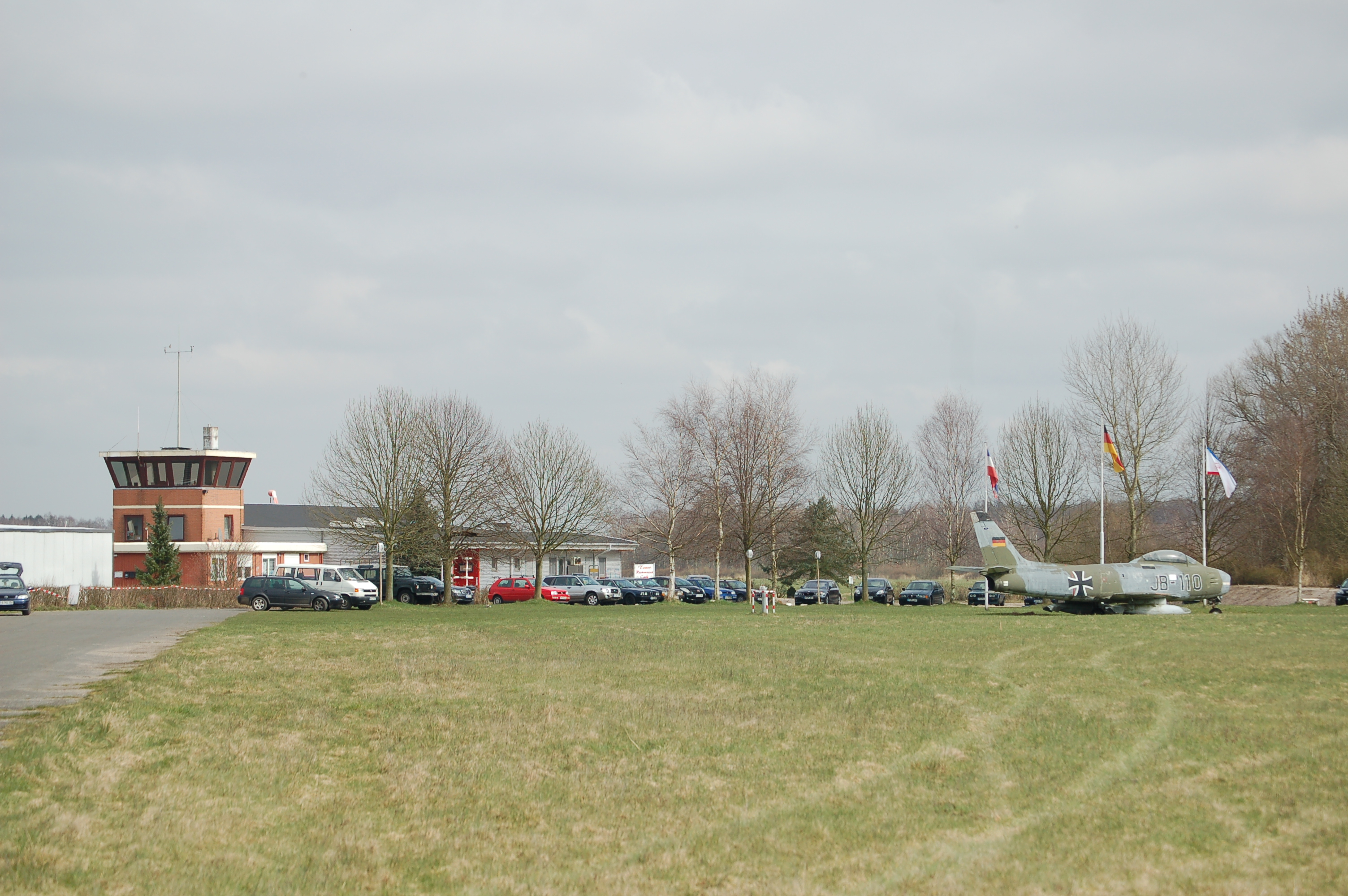
Entrance

As early as 1928, there were deliberations to construct a glider landing field in Uetersen, but it took several years before the first aircraft would take flight. In June 1933 the first glider lifted off and 69 gliders were started until 1934. The biggest challenge, however, was that the sports grounds had to share with the local sports clubs and a large number of people were always present.

The airfield was transformed into a military airfield in the summer of 1935 when the runway was completed. On July 25, 1936, the first motor aircraft landed, piloted by a flight-student of the Flying School Magdeburg. The military-airfield was used in World War II by the Ju 52, Heinkel He 111, Messerschmitt Bf 109 and Bf 110 and several crashes occurred, killing people.

It was also connected to the international airfreight network. The German Lufthansa began operating the air cargo route Uetersen-Copenhagen on January 29, 1940.

The Royal Air Force remained here until the end of November 1955.

The airfield was renamed Marseille Barracks (Marseille-Kaserne) on October 24, 1975, named after German World War II fighter pilot Hans-Joachim Marseille.

On May 13, 1987, private pilot Mathias Rust took off from Uetersen, flying a Cessna F172P, registration D-ECJB, and eventually landed in Red Square Moscow.

The airfield was also home of German Air Force Museum Uetersen from 1956 until 1995, when Luftwaffenmuseum der Bundeswehr was relocated to Berlin-Gatow.

In the 1970s, a Goodyear Blimp N2A airship was a guest.

Today's airfield is used exclusively for civil purposes.

The wings & wheels event was done annually here.

== Airlines companies, clubs and destinations ==
The following airlines offer charter flights at Uetersen Airfield:

- It is the homebase for the business charter operations of Air Hamburg, the biggest company located at the airfield.
- Luftsportverein Kreis Pinneberg e. V. LSV (gliding flight)
- Sailing club Uetersen e.V. SCU (gliding flight)
- Aero-Club Pinneberg e.V. (motor flight)
- Motorfluggemeinschaft Hamburg e.V. (motor flight)
- Hamburger Luftsport e.V. (roof club of some Hamburg air sports clubs, motor and gliding flight)
- Canair aviation company and pilot training,
- Nordcopters GmbH (Helicopter Flight School & Aviation Company),
- HanseAIR, flying school for private pilots, aerobatics and airplane,
- AerialSign, (aerial advertising).

== Major incidents ==
1. On July 29, 1999, a Cessna 152 crashed while attempting a go-around during landing. The flight instructor died, the student survived but was seriously injured.
2. On February 12, 2000, a Ruschmeyer R90 crashed on runway 27. All 3 occupants were killed.
3. On September 2, 2009, a Robinson R22 being used for training crashed shortly after takeoff. The helicopter was completely destroyed, the pilot survived.
4. On March 18, 2010, a Cessna 152 crashed on the runway during landing. One of the two occupants was lightly injured in the accident.
5. On August 7, 2013, a Cessna 172 crashed into a nearby forest after takeoff. Both occupants were killed.
6. On March 22, 2019, a Van's RV 12 crashed into trees during landing with engine problems. Both occupants were uninjured.
7. On September 2, 2021, a B&F Technik FK-9 Mark II D-MNOM at the north south direction curve made a too close approach at the wrong side of the airfield building, crashed on the Trees at Parking Lot and felt to ground, suffered serious injuries and ultralight airplane was complete destroyed.
8. On August 9, 2026, a French Dyn'Aéro MCR4S F-PGRJ aircraft crashed on approaching Heist when it apparently tilted and the engine stopped. It was complete destroyed and one person died.

== Curiosities ==
- The former German Air Force Canadair Sabre CL-13B Mk.6 JB+110 Luftwaffe, Construction Number 1643, with its Turbine removed remains on display in the parking lot. It was on exhibit at the museum until the relocation of the museum to Berlin.

== See also ==
- Transport in Germany
- List of airports in Germany
