= Heidgraben (disambiguation) =

Heidgraben is a municipality in the district of Pinneberg, in Schleswig-Holstein, Germany.

Heidgraben may also refer to two tributaries of the Pinnau in Schleswig-Holstein:

- Heidgraben (Moorrege), left tributary near Moorrege
- Heidgraben (Uetersen), right tributary in Uetersen
