= Johann Georg Christian Lehmann =

German botanist (1792–1860)

- Born: 25 February 1792; Haselau, Duchy of Holstein
- Died: 12 February 1860 (aged 67); Hamburg, German Confederation
- Scientific career
- Fields: Botany
- Institutions: Alter Botanischer Garten Hamburg
- Author abbrev. (botany): Lehm.

Johann Georg Christian Lehmann (25 February 1792 – 12 February 1860) was a German botanist.

Born at Haselau, near Uetersen, Holstein, Lehmann studied medicine in Copenhagen and Göttingen, obtained a doctorate in medicine in 1813 and a doctorate in philosophy from the University of Jena in 1814. He spent the rest of his life as professor of physics and natural sciences, and head librarian, at the Gymnasium Academicum in Hamburg.

A prolific monographist of apparently quarrelsome character, he was a member of 26 learned societies and the founder of the Hamburg Botanical Garden (Botanischer Garten Hamburg, now the Alter Botanischer Garten Hamburg). Lehmann died at Hamburg in 1860.

Some of Lehmann's later illustrations were executed by the German entomologist Johann Wilhelm Meigen. Botanical specimens collected by Lehmann are cared for at institutions including the National Herbarium of Victoria (MEL), Royal Botanic Gardens Victoria.

== Publications ==
- Generis Nicotiniarum Historia Hamburg 1818
- Plantae e Familiae Asperifoliarum Nuciferae 1818
- Monographia Generis Primularum Lipsiae 1819
- Monographia Generis Potentillarum 1820 Supplement 1836
- Semina in Horto Botanico Hamburgensi 1822-1840
- Icones et Descriptiones Novarum et Minus Cognitarum Stirpium in 5 parts of 10 plates each 1: 1821 2: 1822 3: 1823 4: 1823 5: 1824
- Novarum et Minus Cognitarum Stirpium Pugillus I-X Addita Enumeratione Plantarum Omnium in his Pugillus Descriptarum. Hamburgi 1828-1857
- Delectus Seminum quae in Horto Hamburgensium Botanico e Collectioni Anni1830-1840; 1849–1852
- Plantae Preissianae Hamburg 1844-1847
- Index Seminum in Horto Botanico Hamburgensi A. 1851 Collectorum Hamburg 1851-1855
- Revisionem Potentillarum 1856
- Observationes zoologicae praesertim in faunam hamburgensem. Pugillus primus. Indicem scholarum publice privatimque in Hamburgensium Gymnasio Academico 1822
