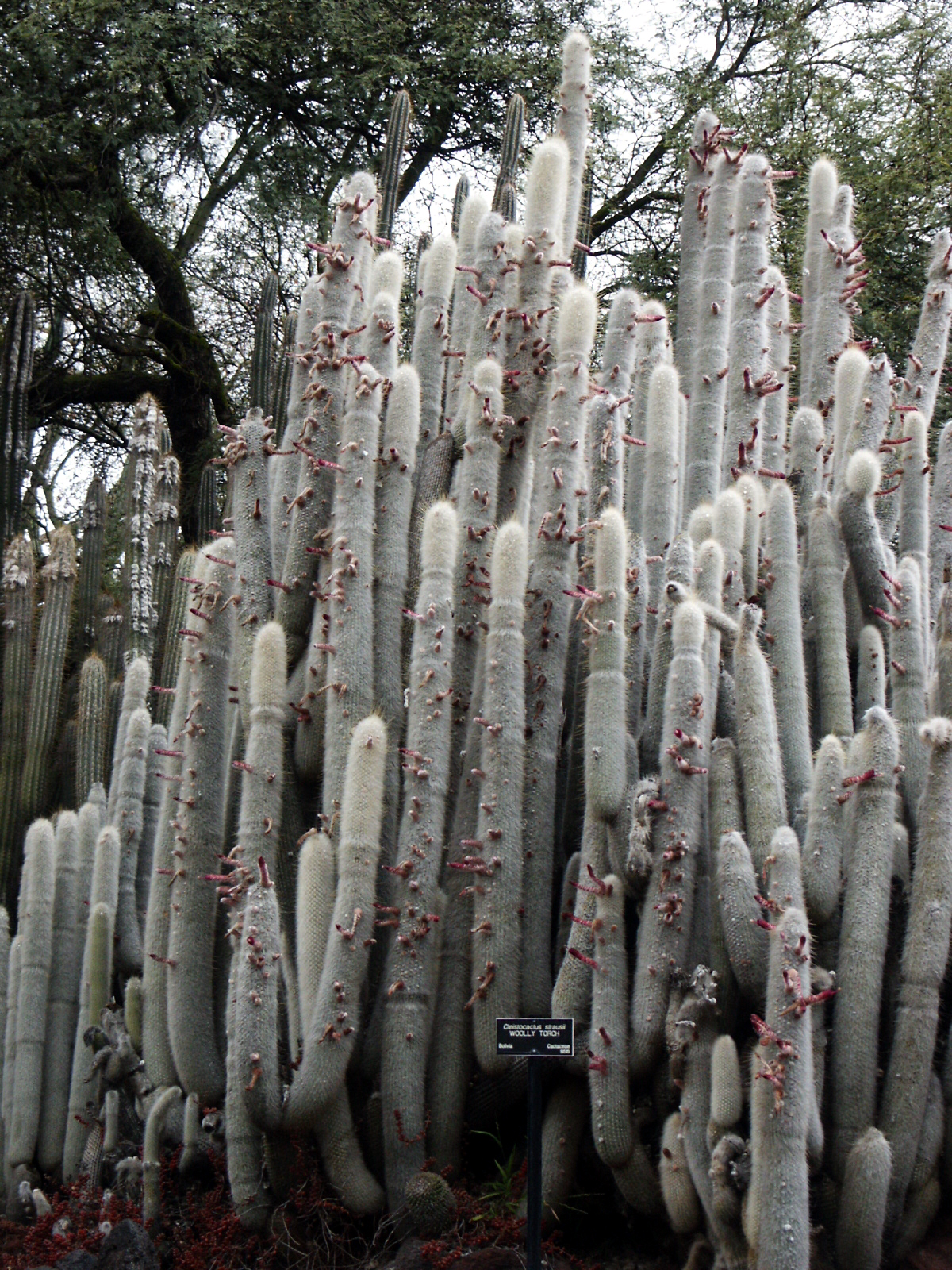

Conservation status
- Least Concern (IUCN 3.1)

Scientific classification
- Kingdom: Plantae
- Clade: Tracheophytes
- Clade: Angiosperms
- Clade: Eudicots
- Order: Caryophyllales
- Family: Cactaceae
- Subfamily: Cactoideae
- Genus: Cleistocactus
- Species: C. strausii

Binomial name
- Cleistocactus strausii (Hesse) Backeb.

Synonyms
- Borzicactus strausii (Heese) A.Berger; Cephalocereus straussii (Heese) Houghton; Cereus strausii (Heese) Vaupel; Denmoza strausii (Heese) Frič; Echinopsis nothostrausii Anceschi & Magli; Echinopsis strausii (Heese) Anceschi & Magli; Pilocereus strausii Heese

= Cleistocactus strausii =

Species of cactus

Cleistocactus strausii, the silver torch or wooly torch, is a perennial flowering plant in the family Cactaceae.

== Description ==
Cleistocactus strausii grows as a shrub, slender, erect, branches out from the base with several upright, with gray-green columns growing up to 3 m (9.8 ft) tall, but only about 6 cm (2.5 in) across, which are covered in white spines. The light green shoots reach a diameter of up to 8 cm (3.1 in) and are completely covered by dense, white spines. There are 25 to 30 ribs and are densely covered with areoles, supporting four yellow-brown spines up to 4 cm (1.5 in) long and 20 shorter white radials. The approximately 4 central spines are light yellow and up to 2 centimeters long. The 30 to 40 white radial spines are hairy to bristly and 1.5 to 5 centimeters long.

Older cacti, over 45 cm (17.5 in) tall, produce tubular flowers in late summer. They are deep red to burgundy and grow up to 6 cm (2.5 in) long cylindrical flowers protrude horizontally and radially from the stem of the cactus.The flower-tube is very densely covered with silky hairs. The pear to spherical, red fruits reach a diameter of up to 2 centimeters. In common with other cacti in the genus Cleistocactus, the flowers hardly open, with only the style and stamens protruding.

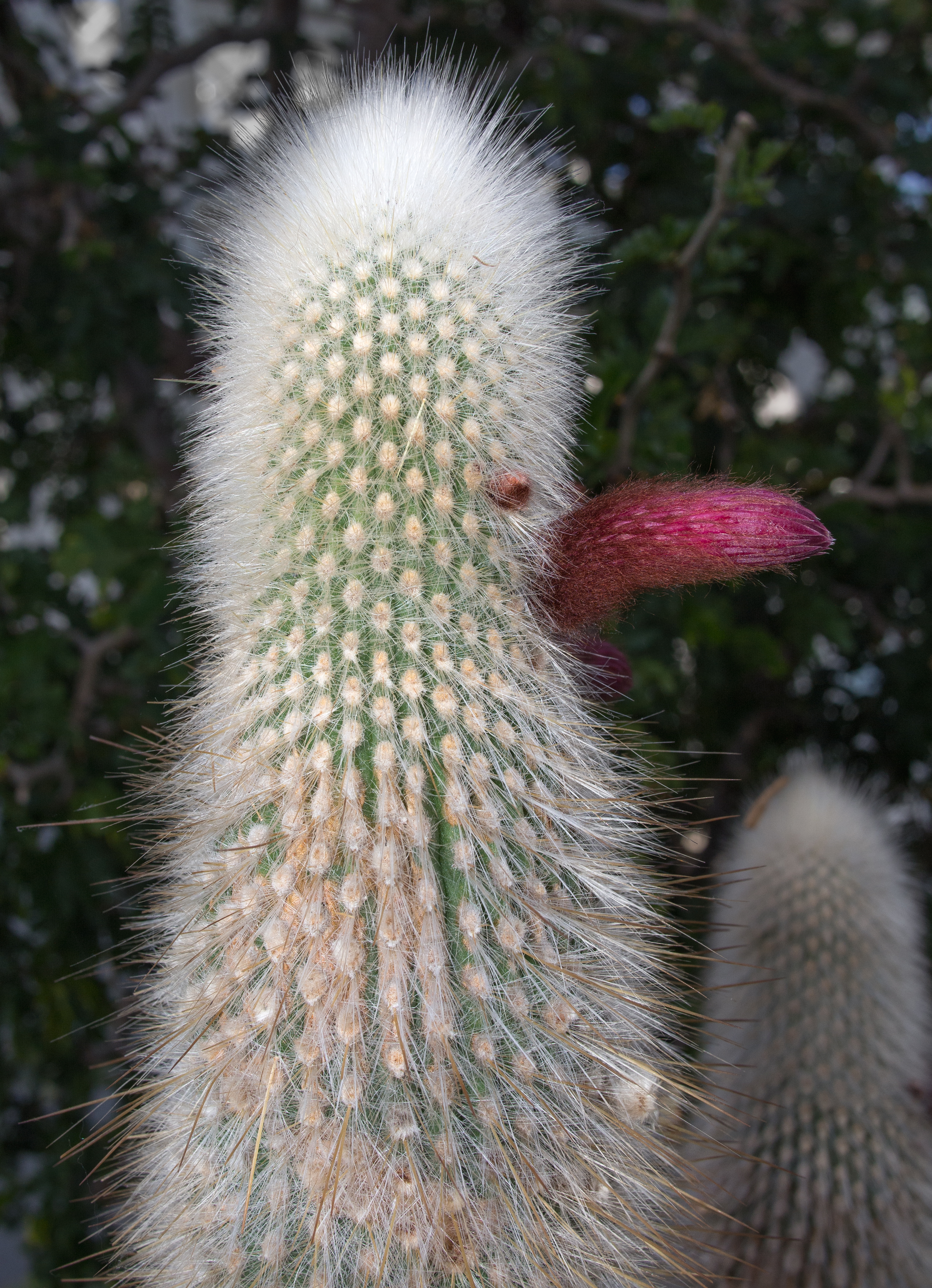

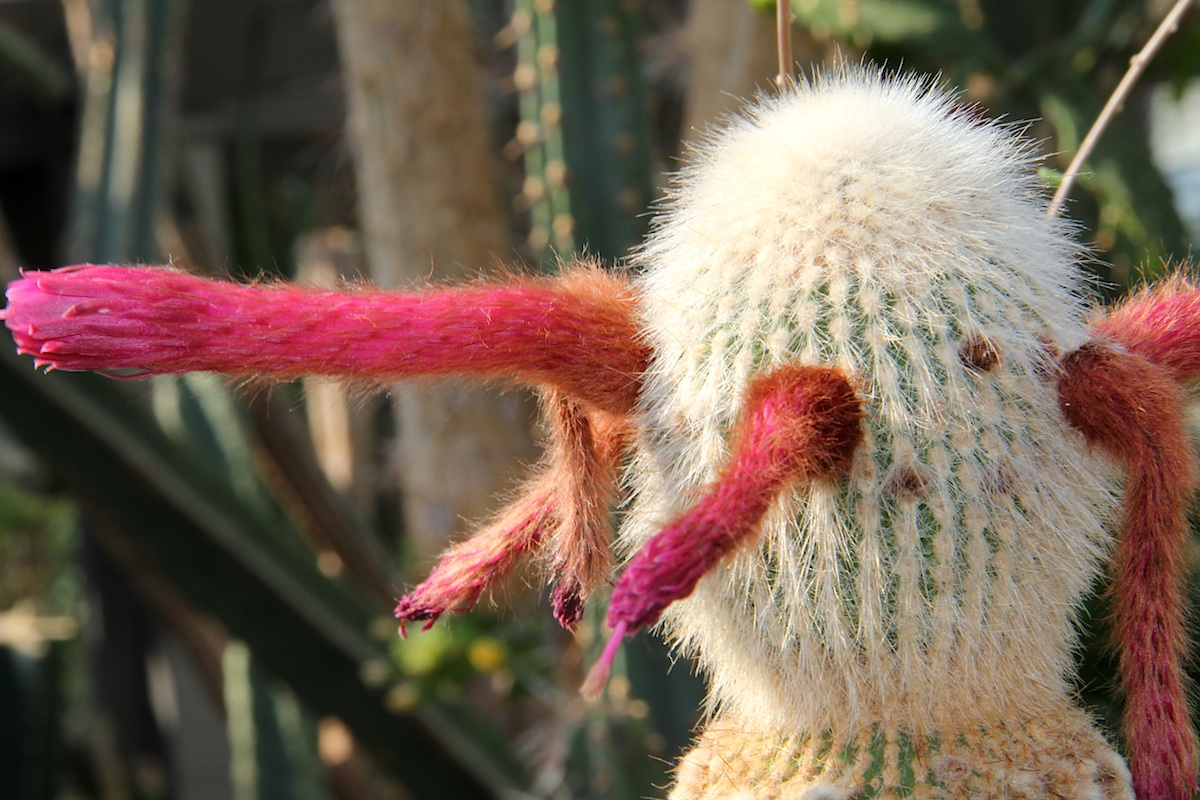

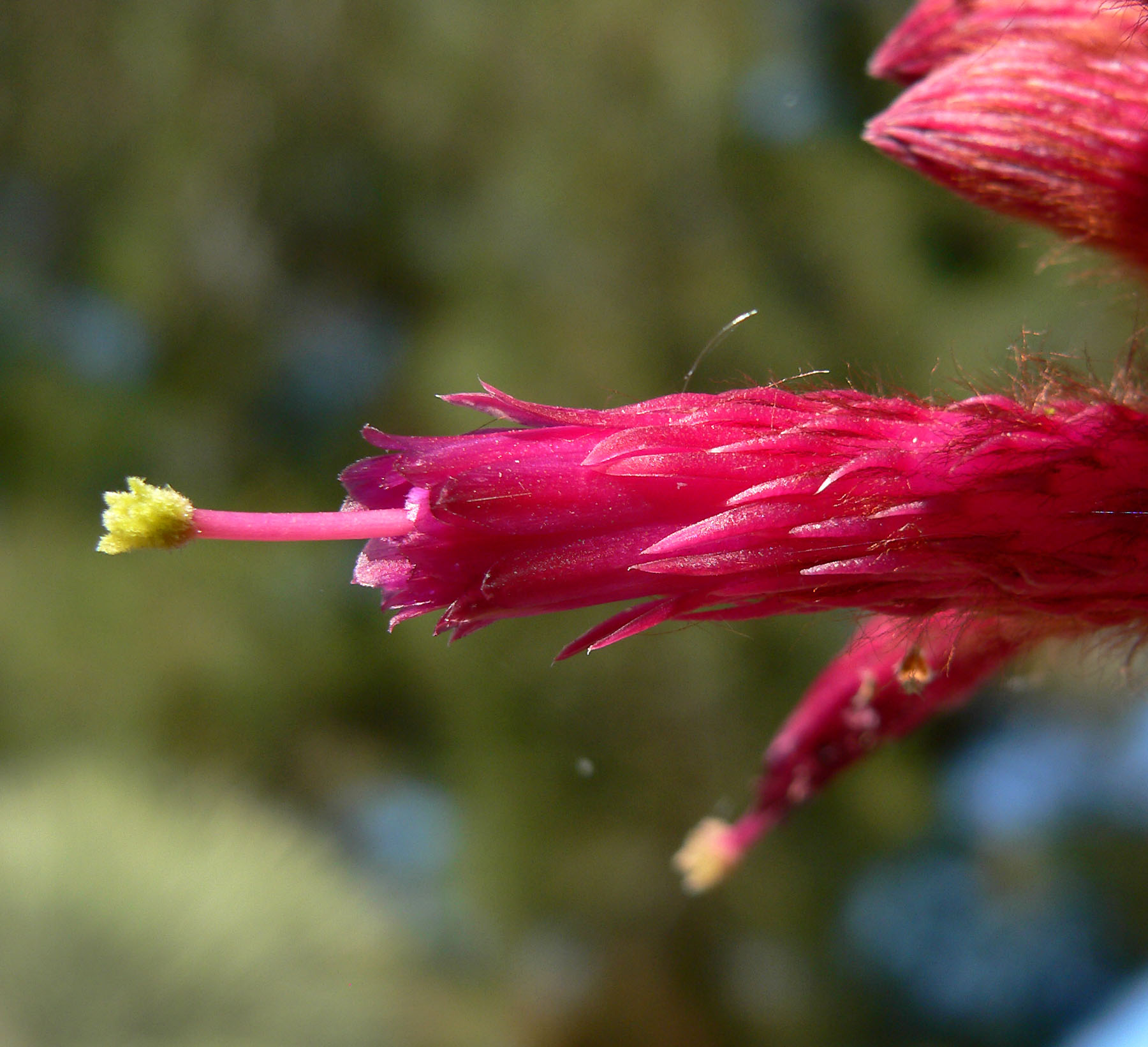
Flower

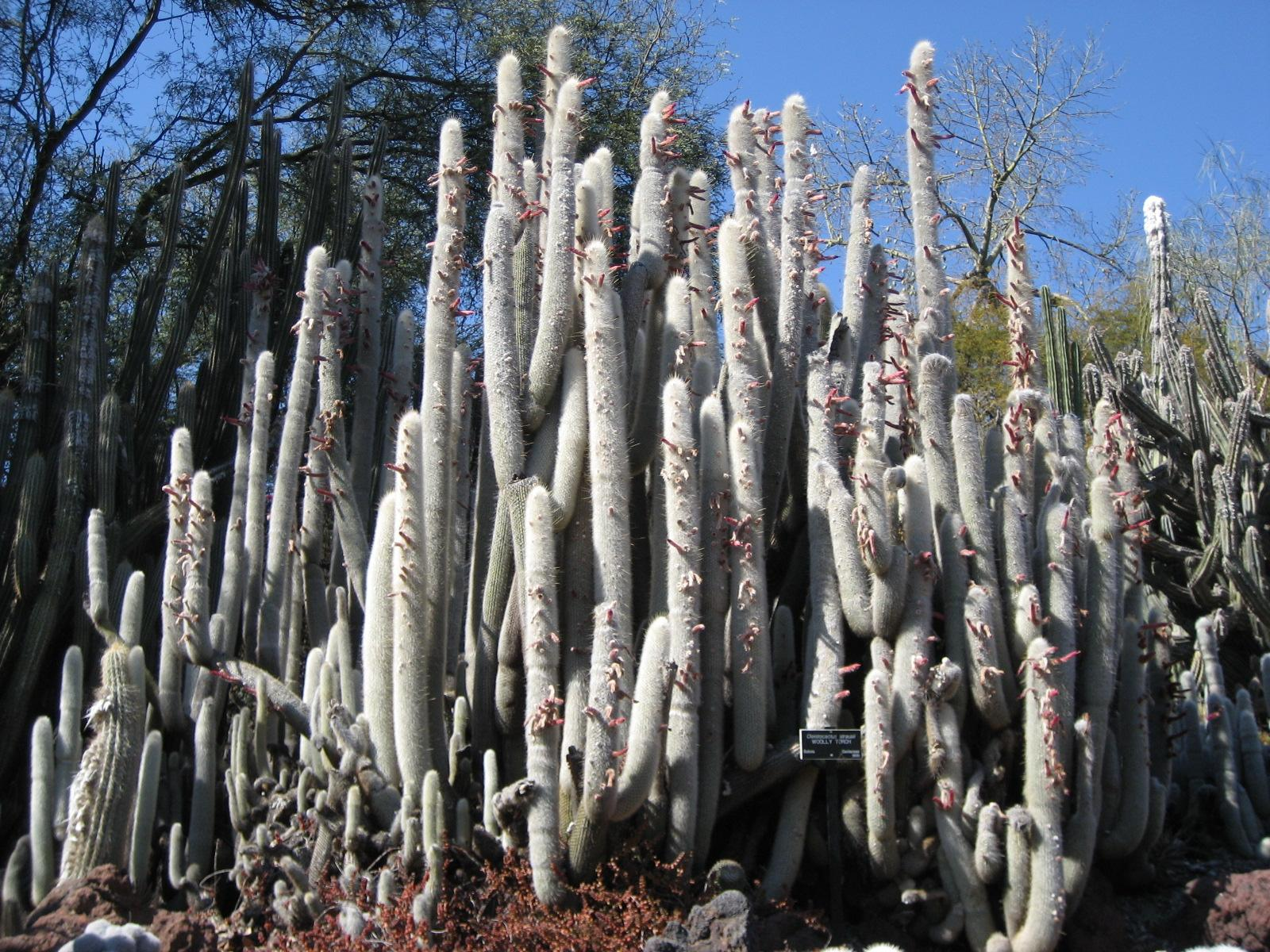
Plant growing in Huntington Gardens

== Distribution ==
It is native to mountainous regions of Department Tarija, Bolivia, at 1,700–2,700 m (5,577–8,858 ft). Cleistocactus strausii is found on steep cliffsides in mountainous regions that are dry and semi-arid. Like other cacti and succulents, it thrives in porous soil and full sun. While partial sunlight is the minimum requirement for survival, full sunlight for several hours a day is required for the silver torch cactus to bloom flowers. It is found growing among Cleistocactus crassicaulis and Cleistocactus hyalacanthus.

Silver torch cacti can thrive in low-nitrogen soils without facing the consequences. Too much water will make the plants weak and lead to root rot. This cactus is locally abundant in its native land and has few local threats to its survival, so it is rated Least Concern.

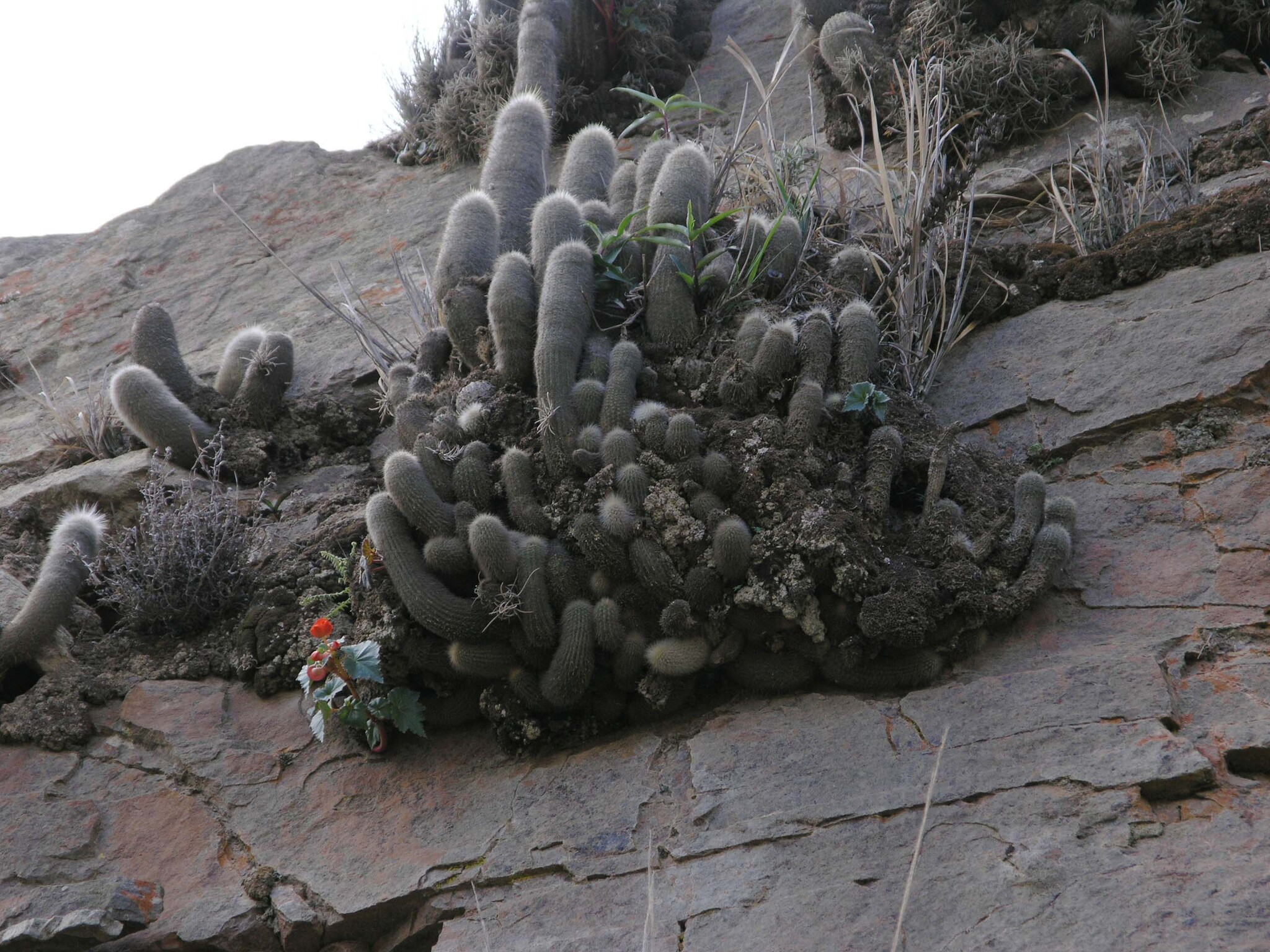
Habitat in Junacas, Bolivia

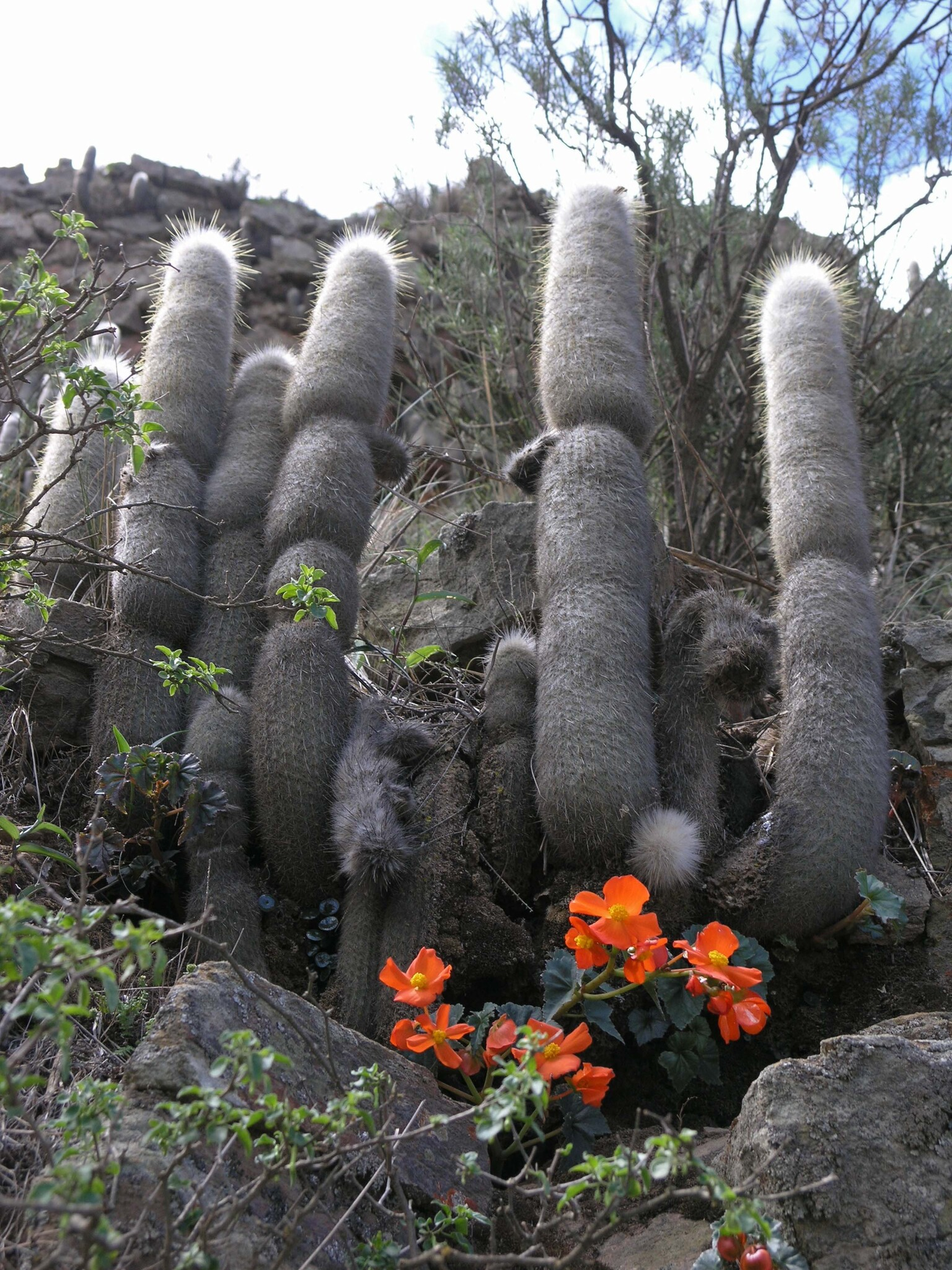

== Taxonomy ==
This species was first described as Pilocereus strausii in 1907 by Emil Heese. The specific epithet strausii honors Leopold Straus, a German merchant and cactus enthusiast. Curt Backeberg placed the species in the genus Cleistocactus in 1934.

== Cultivation ==
It can be propagated by cuttings or seed. Cuttings should be taken near the base of the main stem, similar to cuttings for aloe vera. Rooting of this new cutting usually occurs within 3-8 weeks, therefore it is usually better to propagate silver torch cactus via seed.

This cactus prefers free draining soils, strong sunlight, but not high temperatures; in fact it can withstand hard frosts down to −10 °C (14 °F). In its natural habitat it receives plenty of water during the summer, but almost none over the winter. In cultivation, watering too much in winter often leads to root rot.

Cultivated plants often flower freely. In the United Kingdom, this plant is usually grown under glass, and has gained the Royal Horticultural Society's Award of Garden Merit.

=== Pests ===
The silver torch cactus is most susceptible to mealybugs and spider mite.

Mealybugs are among the most common pests of cacti and succulents. They can be identified by their white, cottony masses on the plant. These are signs that the bugs are reproducing. These pests are especially problematic because they suck out plant sap, depleting the strength of the plant. They can also cause sooty mold along with their fluffy white wax, detracting from the plants' appearance. Another form of mealybug attacks the root system of plants, which is harder to detect.

Mites thrive in the same hot, dry conditions that the silver torch cactus lives in. Spider mites cause damage by sucking out vital nutrients from the plant. Large populations of mites can cause irreversible damage, eventually killing the plant. However, both pests can be hosed off with water.
