= Ilse Rieth =

German church musician and choir director (1928–2021)

- Born: 25 June 1928; Bergedorf, Hamburg, Germany
- Died: 2 February 2021 (aged 92); Uetersen, Schleswig-Holstein, Germany
- Occupations: Church musician and choir director

Ilse Rieth (25 June 1928 – 2 February 2021) was a German church musician and choir director.

== Biography ==
Rieth grew up in Bergedorf with her three older brothers. During the Second World War her family was badly afflicted: her oldest brother died, the other two were heavily wounded. As a child Rieth learned playing the recorder and the piano. In 1948 she took the Abitur at the Luisen-Gymnasium in Bergedorf, then studied church music in Hamburg for three years. After working as a church musician in different towns, among them Moorrege and Uetersen, for 17 years, she was a music teacher in Tornesch and Uetersen until retirement.

Ilse Rieth founded the boys' choir Chorknaben Uetersen in 1965, which she directed until 1991. The choir performed in the television programme Aktuelle Schaubude of the Norddeutscher Rundfunk and organised concert tours through Europe and the United States. Further highlights included meetings with former Chancellor Helmut Kohl and the pope. In 1968 Rieth founded a recorder ensemble and later a chamber choir. She received the Order of Merit of the Federal Republic of Germany in 1986 for her musical contributions.

Rieth died on 2 February 2021, aged 92.
