= Torch cactus =

Torch cactus is a common name for several plants and may refer to:

- Silver torch cactus (Cleistocactus strausii)
- Peruvian torch cactus (Echinopsis peruviana)
