= Heidgraben (Moorrege) =

Location
- Country: Germany
- States: Schleswig-Holstein

Physical characteristics
- Mouth
  - location: Pinnau
  - coordinates: 53°40′34″N 9°39′26″E

Basin features
- Progression: Pinnau→ Elbe→ North Sea

Heidgraben is a small river of Schleswig-Holstein, Germany. It is a left tributary of the Pinnau near Moorrege.

== See also ==
- List of rivers of Schleswig-Holstein
