= August Landmesser =

German man believed to be the subject of 1936 photograph (1910–1944)

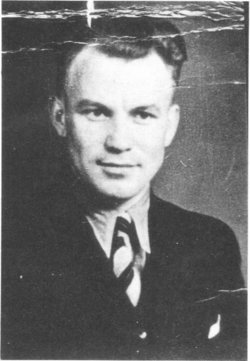
- Born: 24 May 1910; Moorrege, Schleswig-Holstein, German Empire
- Died: 17 October 1944 (aged 34); Ston, Independent State of Croatia
- Burial place: A mass grave near Hodilje
- Spouse(s): Irma Eckler (a 1935 marriage illegal under the Nuremberg Laws, but retroactively legalized in 1951)
- Children: 2
- Military career
- Allegiance: none; forcible conscription by Nazi Germany
- Branch: Deutsches Heer
- Service years: 1944
- Rank: Soldat
- Unit: 999th Light Afrika Division
- Conflicts: World War II; World War II in Yugoslavia

August Landmesser (German: [ˈaʊ̯ɡʊst ˈlantˌmɛsɐ]; 24 May 1910 – 17 October 1944) was a German man who is suggested to be the man appearing in a 1936 photograph conspicuously refusing to perform the Nazi salute. Landmesser had run afoul of the Nazi Party over his unlawful relationship with Irma Eckler, a Jewish woman. For this, he was imprisoned and eventually drafted into penal military service, where he was killed in action.

Years after his death, his daughter suggested that he was the man in the famous photograph. However, the identity of the man in the photograph is not known with certainty—another family claims that the man is Gustav Wegert.

== Biography ==
August Landmesser was born in Moorrege in 1910, the only child of August Franz Landmesser and Wilhelmine Magdalene (née Schmidtpott). In 1931, hoping it would help him get employment, he joined the Nazi Party. In 1935, when he became engaged to Irma Eckler (a Jewish woman), he was expelled from the party. They registered to be married in Hamburg, but the Nuremberg Laws enacted a month later prevented it. On 29 October 1935, Landmesser and Eckler's first daughter, Ingrid, was born.

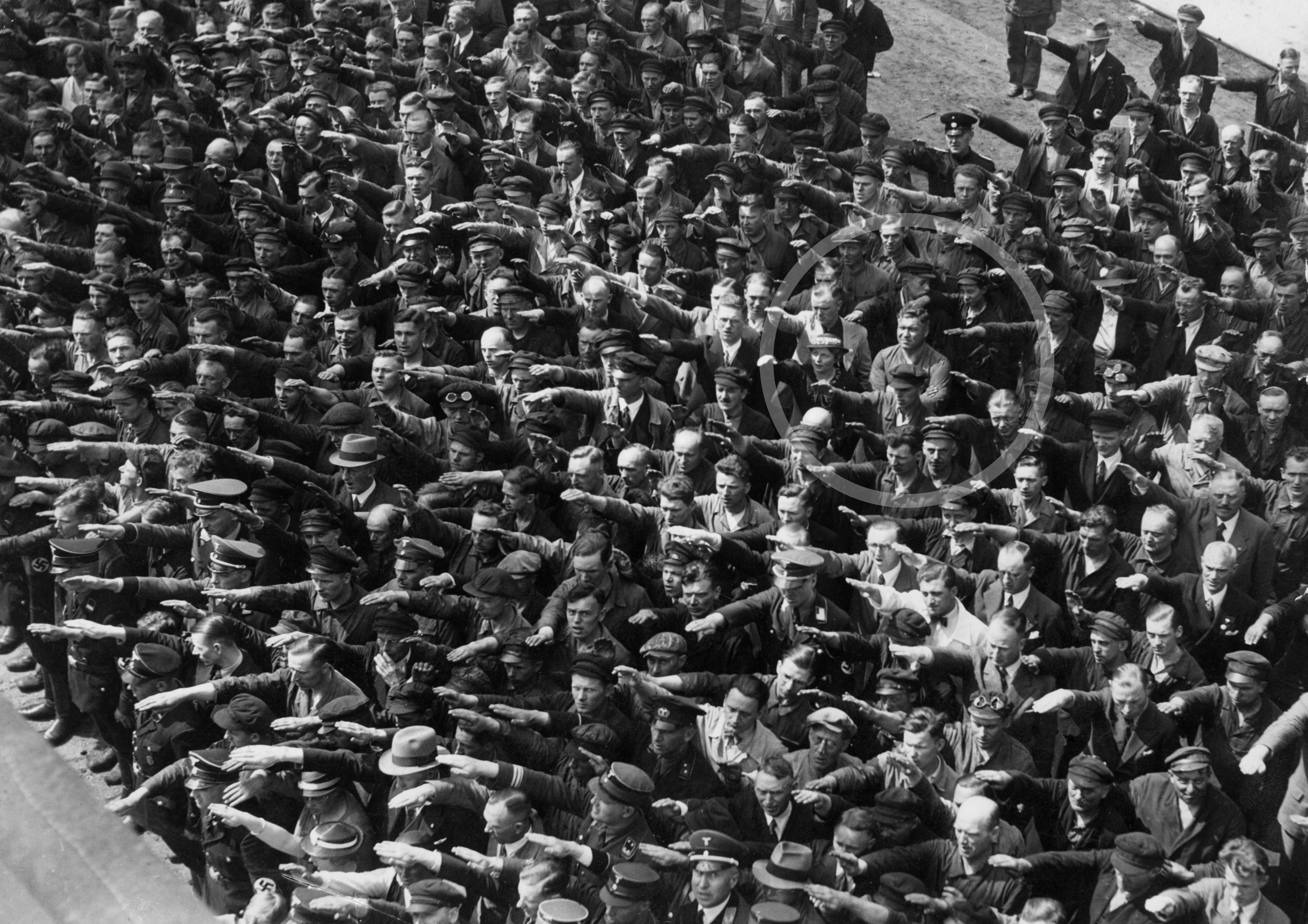
1936 photo, in which a man (circled in center-right) alleged to be August Landmesser is conspicuously not giving the Nazi salute

In 1937, Landmesser attempted to flee Nazi Germany to Denmark with his family but he was detained at the border and charged with "dishonoring the race," or "racial infamy," under the Nuremberg Laws. He argued that neither he nor Eckler knew whether she was fully Jewish. He was acquitted on 27 May 1938 for lack of evidence, with the warning that a repeat offense would result in a multi-year prison sentence.

The couple publicly continued their relationship, and on 15 July 1938, Landmesser was arrested again and sentenced to two and a half years in the Börgermoor concentration camp. Eckler was detained by the Gestapo and held at the prison Fuhlsbüttel, where she gave birth to their second daughter, Irene. From there, Eckler was sent to the Oranienburg concentration camp, then to the Lichtenburg concentration camp for women, and finally to the women's concentration camp at Ravensbrück. A few letters from Irma Eckler were received until January 1942. It is believed that she was taken to the Bernburg Euthanasia Centre in February 1942, where she was among the 14,000 murdered. In the course of post-war documentation, in 1949, she was pronounced legally dead, with a date of 28 April 1942.

Meanwhile, Landmesser was discharged from prison on 19 January 1941. He worked as a foreman for the haulage company Püst. The company had a branch at the Heinkel-Werke (factory) in Warnemünde. In February 1944 he was drafted into a penal battalion, the 999th Fort Infantry Battalion. After fighting in Croatia on 17 October 1944, he was declared killed in action. Like Eckler, he was declared legally dead in 1949.

Initially, their children were taken to the city orphanage. Later, Ingrid was allowed to live with her maternal grandmother. In 1941, Irene went to the home of foster parents. After her grandmother's death in 1953, Ingrid also was placed with foster parents.

The marriage of August Landmesser and Irma Eckler was recognized retroactively by the Senate of Hamburg in the summer of 1951. In the autumn of that year Ingrid assumed the surname Landmesser. Irene continued to use the surname Eckler.

== Recognition ==
A figure identified by Irene Eckler as August Landmesser is visible in a photograph taken on 13 June 1936, which was published in 1991 in Die Zeit. It shows a large gathering of workers at the Blohm+Voss shipyard in Hamburg for the launching of the navy training ship Horst Wessel. Almost everyone in the image has raised their arm in the Nazi salute, with the most obvious exception of a man toward the back of the crowd, who grimly stands with his arms crossed over his chest.

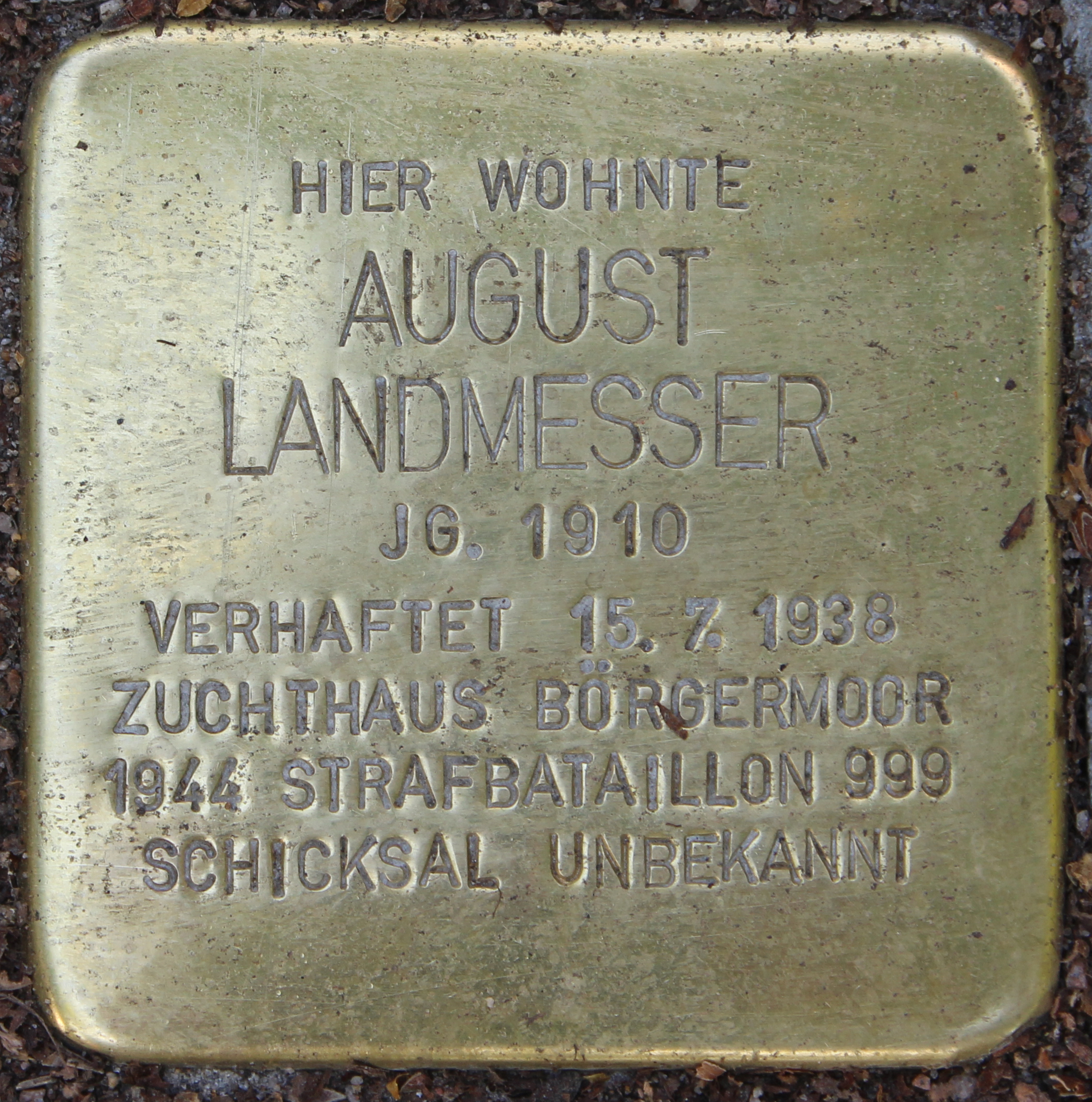
The Stolperstein in Hamburg honoring August Landmesser

In 1996, Irene Eckler published Die Vormundschaftsakte 1935–1958: Verfolgung einer Familie wegen "Rassenschande" (The Guardianship Documents 1935–1958: Persecution of a Family for "Racial Disgrace"). The book tells the story of her family and includes a large number of original documents from the time in question, including letters from her mother and documents from state institutions.

However, the identity of the man in the photograph is not known with certainty. Another family claims that the man is Gustav Wegert (1890–1959), a metalworker at Blohm+Voss who habitually refused to salute on religious grounds. They have presented documentation of Wegert's employment at Blohm+Voss at that time which advocates take as stronger evidence, as well as family photographs that better resemble the man in the photograph, as evidence.

August Landmesser's name appears on a Stolperstein ("stumbling stone") in Hamburg.

Finn Wittrock portrays Landmesser in Ava DuVernay's 2023 motion picture Origin.
