= 999th Light Afrika Division =

999th Africa Division
- Afrika-Division 999
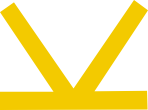
- Emblem of the division
- Active: 6 October 1942
- Disbanded: 15 May 1943
- Country: Nazi Germany
- Branch: Heer (Wehrmacht)
- Type: Penal military unit
- Role: Bandenbekämpfung; Combined arms Desert warfare Forward observer Raiding
- Garrison/HQ: Heuberg
- Engagements: World War II: North African Campaign; Tunisian Campaign; Partisan war in Greece

The 999th Light Africa Division (999. leichte Afrika-Division) was a German Army unit formed in Tunisia in early 1943. The basis of the division was the 999th Africa Brigade (999. Afrika-Brigade), formed several months earlier, as a penal military unit. While all members of Nazi punishment units were labeled "criminals", a significant proportion of the brigade's members had been transferred to it for holding, or being perceived to hold, anti-Nazi ideas.

The division was not fully formed when Axis forces in North Africa began to collapse. Consequently, the elements of the division that fought in Tunisia generally did so as independent battalions or companies, which suffered high losses (in terms of casualties and captured) before being withdrawn. Fighting mostly against US Army forces, many members of the division reportedly surrendered their positions to the Americans without a fight.

Afterwards, the severely-depleted division was sent to Axis-occupied Greece for garrison duties and to conduct "Bandenbekämpfung"; a term which, in Nazi usage, was usually a euphemism for anti-partisan campaigns.

During the deployment to Greece, some members of the division commenced (or recommenced) a range of subversive and/or anti-Nazi activities. The most prominent of these was Falk Harnack, who defected to the Greek resistance and, with other German defectors, formed the Anti-Fascist Committee for a Free Germany (AKFD). Another notable member of the 999th was August Landmesser, who reportedly refused to make the Nazi salute during his military service and had been depicted in such a protest, in a famous photograph.

== Commanders ==
Commanders were:

- Oberst Heinz Karl von Rinkleff – October 1942 to 2 February 1943 (transferred to Russian front after the surrender at Stalingrad)
- Generalleutnant Kurt Thomas – 2 February 1943 to 1 April 1943) (KIA 1 April 1943 when his plane was shot down by Luftwaffe fighters en route to Tunis.)
- Generalmajor Ernst-Günther Baade – 2 April 1943 to 13 May 1943)

== Organization ==
Order of battle of Afrika-Brigade 999

- Afrika-Schützen-Regiment (Infantry) 961
- Afrika-Schützen-Regiment 962
- Nachrichten-Kompanie (Communications) 999

Order of battle of 999 Afrika Division

- Stab
- Divisions-Kartenstelle (Maps) 999
- Afrika-Schützen-Regiment 961
- Afrika-Schützen-Regiment 962
- Afrika-Schützen-Regiment 963
- Panzerjäger-Abteilung 999
- Artillerie-Regiment (Artillery) 999
- Pionier-Bataillon (Engineers) 999
- Aufklärungs-Abteilung (Reconnaissance) 999
- Astronomischer Messtrupp (Navigation) 999
- Werkstatt-Kompanie (Laboratory) 999
- Werkstatt-Kompanie 999
- Entgiftungs-Batterie (Detoxification) 999
- Nachschub-Bataillon (Supply) 999
- Schlächterei-Kompanie (Butchers) 999
- Bäckerei-Kompanie (Bakers) 999
- Divisions-Verpflegungsamt (Rations) 999
- Sanitäts-Kompanie (Medical) 999
- Krankenkraftwagen-Zug (Ambulance) 999
- Veterinär-Kompanie (Veterinary) 999
- Feldgendarmerie-Trupp (Military police) 999
- Feldpostamt (Postal) 999

== See also ==
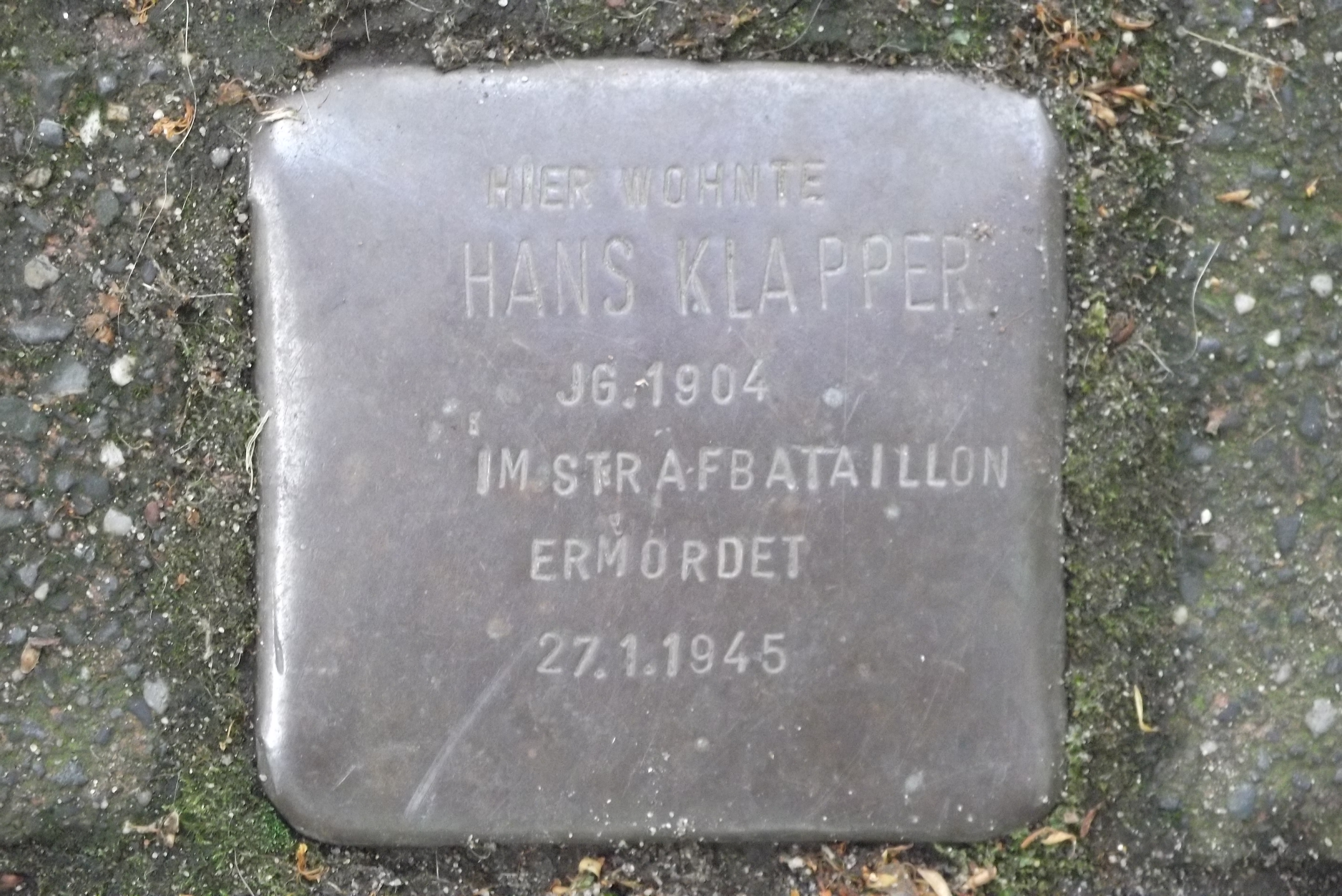
Stolperstein for Hans Klapper, a victim from the "Strafdivision 999"

- 36th Waffen Grenadier Division of the SS
- Afrika Korps
- August Landmesser
- Division (military), Military unit
- Fliegerführer Afrika
- North African Campaign
- Panzer Army Africa
- Strafbattalion - punishment units in the Wehrmacht.
- Wehrmacht divisions in World War II
