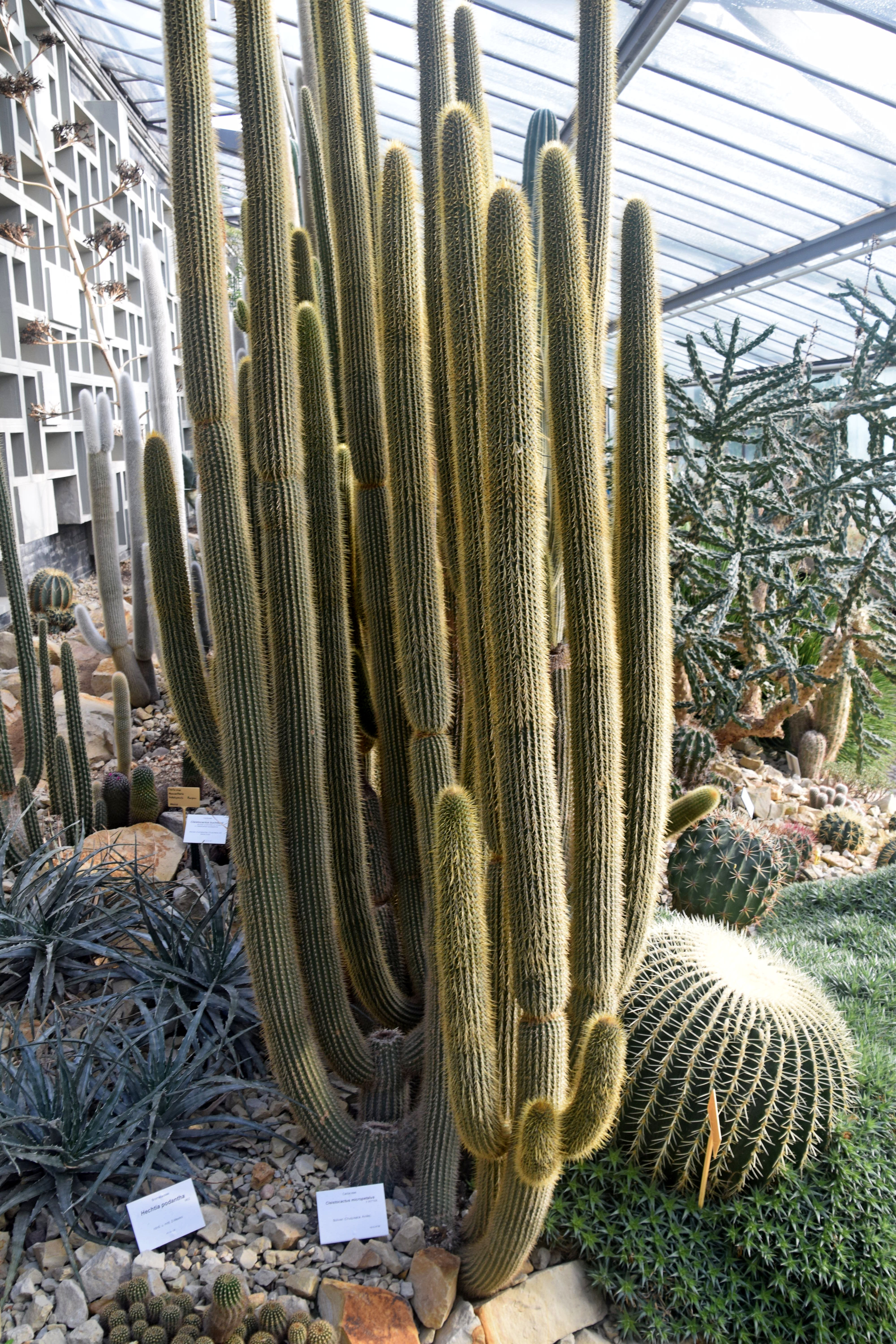
- Cleistocactus crassicaulis in Alter Botanischer Garten Hamburg

Conservation status
- Least Concern (IUCN 3.1)

Scientific classification
- Kingdom: Plantae
- Clade: Tracheophytes
- Clade: Angiosperms
- Clade: Eudicots
- Order: Caryophyllales
- Family: Cactaceae
- Subfamily: Cactoideae
- Genus: Cleistocactus
- Species: C. crassicaulis

Binomial name
- Cleistocactus crassicaulis F.Ritter 1980

Synonyms
- Cleistocactus clavicaulis Cárdenas 1964; Cleistocactus crassicaulis var. paucispinus F.Ritter 1980; Cleistocactus micropetalus F.Ritter 1980; Cleistocactus tominensis subsp. micropetalus (F.Ritter) Mottram 2002; Cleistocactus viridialabastri Cárdenas 1963; Echinopsis micropetala (F.Ritter) Anceschi & Magli 2021

= Cleistocactus crassicaulis =

Species of cactus

Cleistocactus crassicaulis is a species of columnar cacti in the genus Cleistocactus.

== Description ==
Cleistocactus cassicaulis is a shrubby cactus with slightly spreading to spreading gray-green shoots that branch at the base. It grows to heights of 1.5 to 3 meters and has a diameter of 6 to 8 cm (2.4 to 3.1 in). The plant features 16 to 18 undulating ribs, with areoles spaced about 1 cm (0.39 in) apart along these ribs. The spines are golden-yellow, straight, and range from 1 to 4 cm (0.39 to 1.57 in) in length. Typically, there is one strong, needle-like central spine, sometimes several, measuring 2 to 4 cm (0.79 to 1.57 in). Additionally, there are 5 to 6 radial spines, each between 5 and 15 mm (0.59 in) long.

The plant produces many radially symmetrical green flowers near the tips of its shoots, which open at night. These flowers are approximately 2.2 to 3 cm (0.87 to 1.18 in) long. The green bracts beneath the flowers are very small, about 3 mm (0.12 in). The spherical fruits are light yellow to reddish-yellow, measuring 1.5 to 2 cm (0.59 to 0.79 in) in diameter. They split irregularly from the tip when ripe.

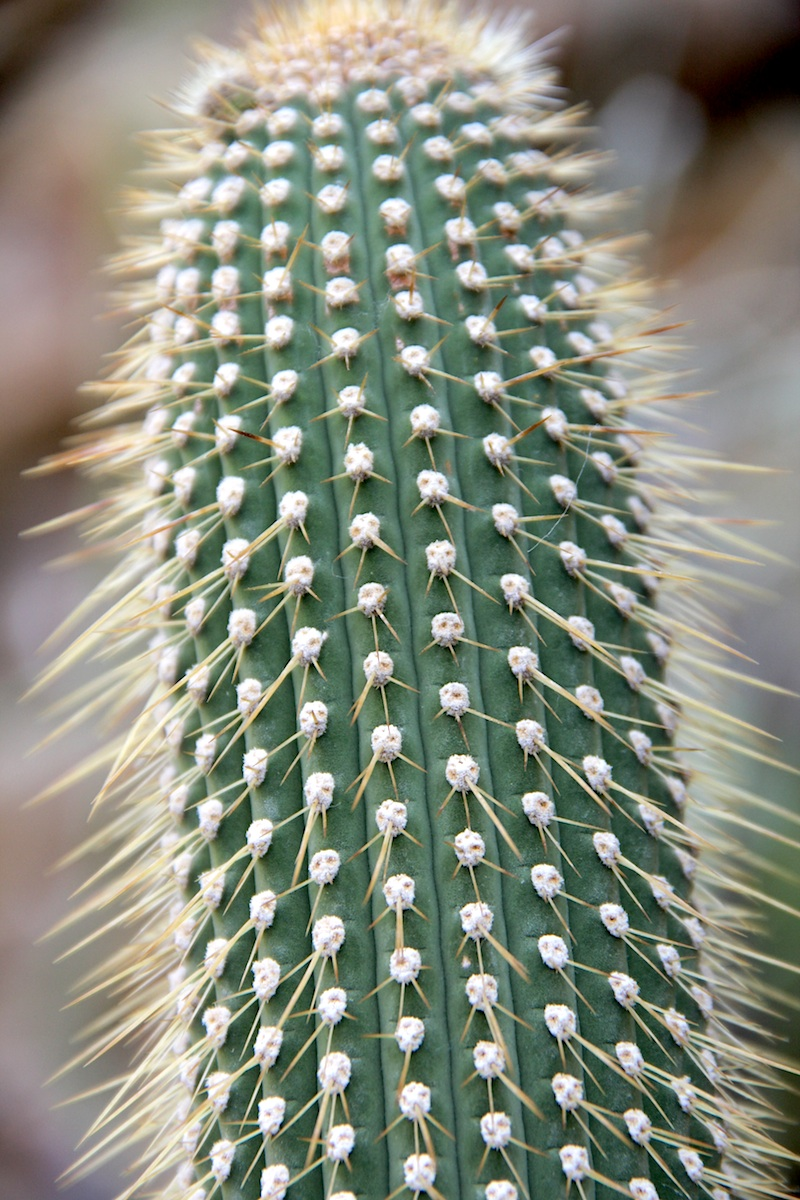
Top of plant

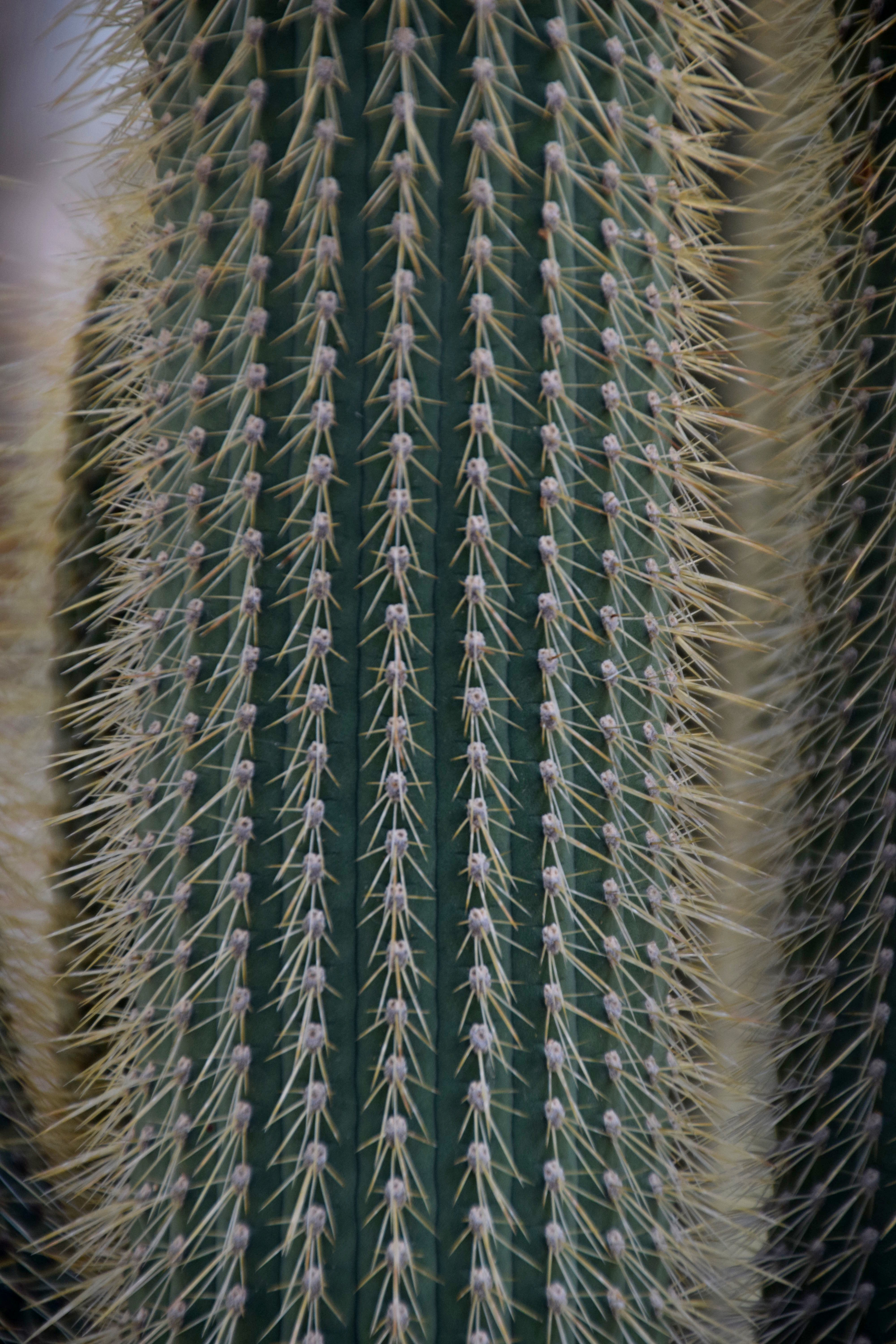
Spines

== Distribution ==
Cleistocactus cassicaulis is native to Bolivia, specifically in the departments of Chuquisaca and Tarija, where it grows in Yungas at elevations between 750 and 2,300 meters.

== Taxonomy ==
The species was first described in 1961 by Martín Cárdenas, based on a plant collected in Angosto de Villa Montes in Tarija Department, Bolivia. It was named for its tick-like stems. In 2002, Roy Mottram classified it as a subspecies of Cleistocactus tominensis. However, it is distinguished from C. tominensis by having fewer ribs and radial spines, and it occurs at lower elevations. Later, it was recognized as a distinct species.
