= Heidgraben =

- Municipality
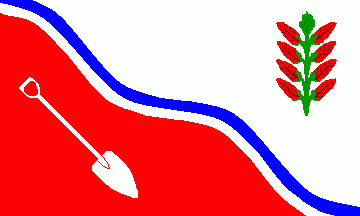
- Flag Coat of arms

- Location of Heidgraben within Pinneberg district
- Interactive map of Heidgraben
- Location within Germany Location within Schleswig-Holstein
- Coordinates: 53°42′18″N 9°40′55″E
- Country: Germany
- State: Schleswig-Holstein
- District: Pinneberg
- Municipal assoc.: Geest und Marsch Südholstein

Government
  - Mayor: Julian Kabel (CDU)

Area
  - Total: 5.37 km^{2} (2.07 sq mi)
- Elevation: 11 m (36 ft)

Population (2025-12-31)
  - Total: 2,894
  - Density: 539/km^{2} (1,400/sq mi)
- Time zone: UTC+01:00 (CET)
  - Summer (DST): UTC+02:00 (CEST)
- Postal codes: 25436
- Dialling codes: 04122
- Vehicle registration: PI
- Website: www.amt-moorrege.de

Heidgraben is a municipality in the district of Pinneberg, in Schleswig-Holstein, Germany.

The number of citizens working in agriculture or in tree nurseries is only small. The majority commutes to surrounding places or to Hamburg. Heidgraben has an elementary school. There are no shopping facilities, but the community has a small supermarket.

== Geography and Infrastructure ==
Heidgraben is situated 18 kilometres in the northwest of Hamburg on the edge of the Marsh, on the Geest land. It abuts to the towns Uetersen and Tornesch and the communities Klein Nordende and Groß Nordende.

The large area of Heidgraben is very widespread populated. Large parts of this area are nature preserve areas.

Heidgraben is connected to the public transport with bus routes to Uetersen and Tornesch. From Tornesch via train to Elmshorn, Pinneberg and Hamburg.

In the east of Heidgraben there is the Autobahn 23 located, access in Tornesch and Elmshorn.
