= Neuendeich =

- Municipality
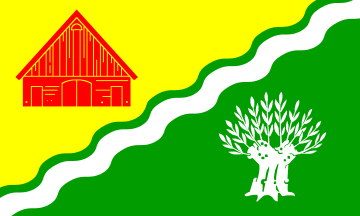
- Flag Coat of arms

- Location of Neuendeich within Pinneberg district
- Interactive map of Neuendeich
- Location within Germany Location within Schleswig-Holstein
- Coordinates: 53°41′N 9°37′E
- Country: Germany
- State: Schleswig-Holstein
- District: Pinneberg
- Municipal assoc.: Geest und Marsch Südholstein

Government
  - Mayor: Reinhardt Pliquet (SPD)

Area
  - Total: 8.54 km^{2} (3.30 sq mi)
- Elevation: 5 m (16 ft)

Population (2025-12-31)
  - Total: 498
  - Density: 58.3/km^{2} (151/sq mi)
- Time zone: UTC+01:00 (CET)
  - Summer (DST): UTC+02:00 (CEST)
- Postal codes: 25436
- Dialling codes: 04122, 04125
- Vehicle registration: PI
- Website: www.amt-moorrege.de

Neuendeich (German pronunciation: [ˈnɔʏəndaɪç]) is a municipality in the district of Pinneberg, in Schleswig-Holstein, Germany.
