= Alter Botanischer Garten Hamburg =

Botanical garden in the Planten un Blomen park of Hamburg, Germany

Alter Botanischer Garten
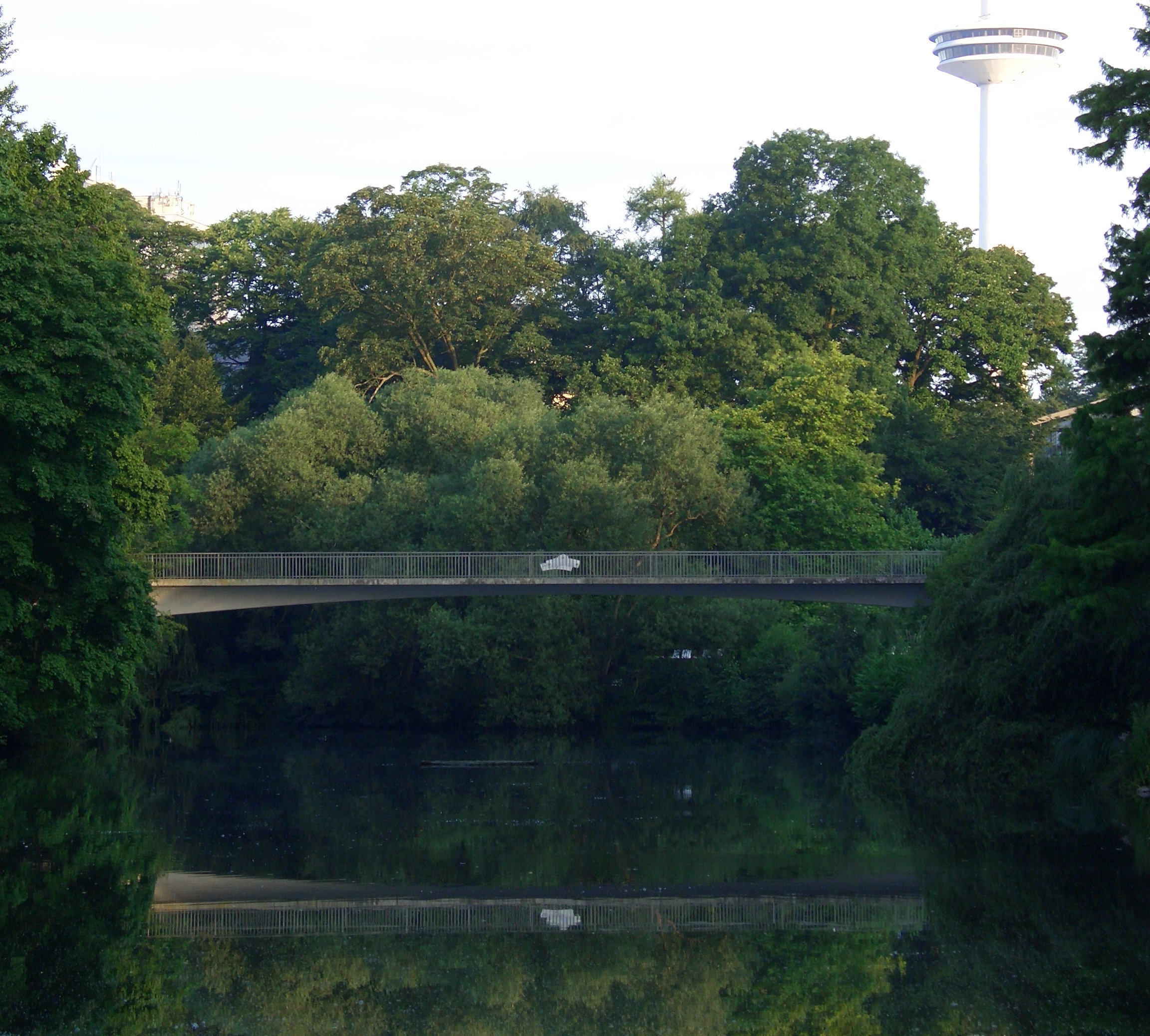
- The bridge in the park is named after Jan van Valckenborgh who extended the city's wall in the seventeenth century.

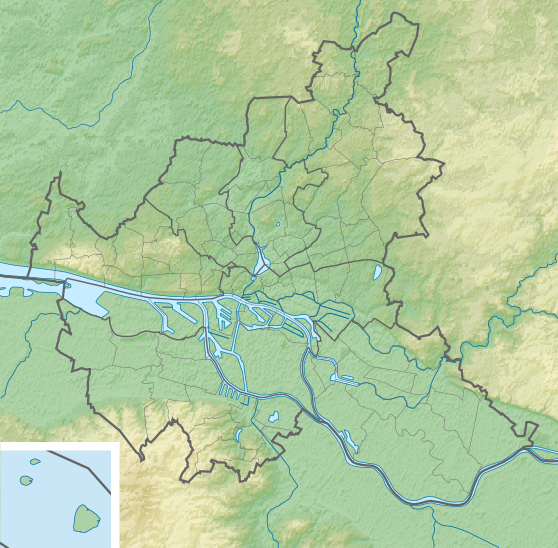
- Location within Hamburg Location within Germany
- Interactive map of Alter Botanischer Garten
- Type: Botanical garden
- Location: Hamburg
- Coordinates: 53°33′40″N 9°58′59″E
- Opened: 1821
- Status: Open all year
- Collections: Ferns, Sub-tropical, Tropical, Palms and Succulents
- Website: Alter Botanischer Garten Hamburg (Tropengewächshäuser)

The Alter Botanischer Garten Hamburg (Old Botanical Garden Hamburg), sometimes also known as the Schaugewächshaus or the Tropengewächshäuser, is a botanical garden now consisting primarily of greenhouses in the Planten un Blomen park of Hamburg, Germany. Alter Botanischer Garten is located on the Hamburg Wallring at Stephansplatz and is open daily without charge.

== Description ==
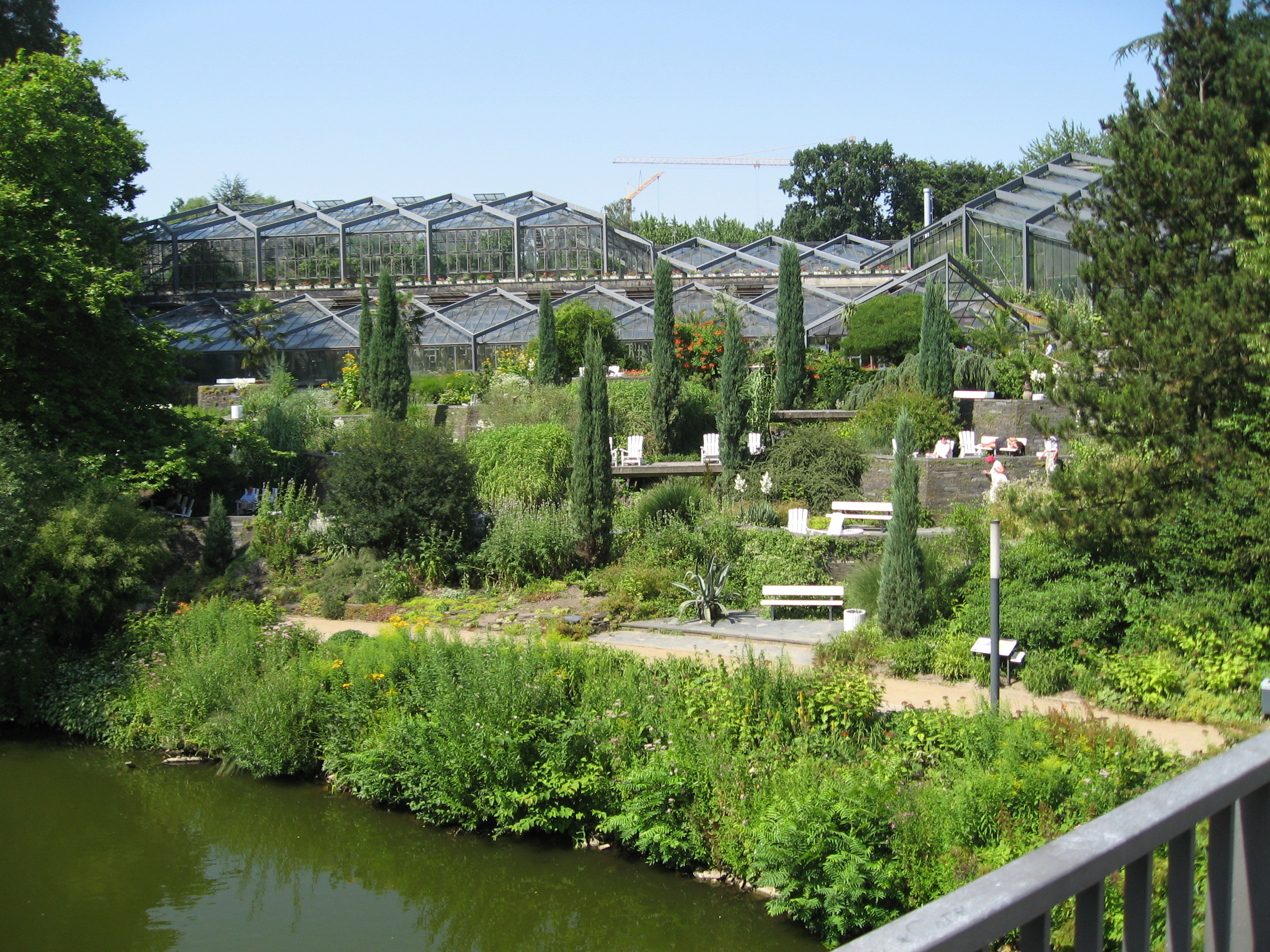
Greenhouses in the Alter Botanischer Garten Hamburg, designed by architect Bernhard Hermkes

The garden is located on the site of Hamburg's old botanical garden at the city wall, established 1821 by Professor Johann Georg Christian Lehmann (1792–1860). Its alpine garden was established in 1903; most plants were subsequently moved to the new Botanischer Garten Hamburg in 1979. Herbal and medicinal plantings are clustered around the city's former moat. Today's gardens consist primarily of five interconnected greenhouses, total area 2,800 m^{2}, built 1962–1963 by architect Bernhard Hermkes (1903–1995), as follows:

- Schaugewächshaus (Show Greenhouse) - with a subtropical focus on the Mediterranean region and Canary Islands, South Africa, and sclerophyllous zones in California and southern Chile, containing trees such as laurel and olive, various coniferous trees such as Araucaria, palm trees, eucalyptus, and tree ferns.
- Farnhaus - ferns.
- Palmfarnhhaus - ancient plants described in 1834 by Professor Johann Georg Christian Lehmann (1792–1860).
- Succulent house - succulent plants from the dry regions, particularly the semi-deserts of Africa and the Americas.
- Tropical house - about 800 m^{2} area, maximum height of 13 meters, containing tropical plants from throughout the world, with a focus on South American plants and tropical crops.

The garden contains special collections of Aizoaceae (30,000 accessions representing about 1,500 species), Orchidaceae (about 2,500 accessions), Bambusoideae, Begoniaceae, Bromeliaceae, Cycadaceae, Masdevallia, Piperaceae, and Zingiberaceae.

== See also ==
- Dammtor
- Botanischer Garten Hamburg
- List of botanical gardens in Germany
