= Groß Nordende =

- Municipality
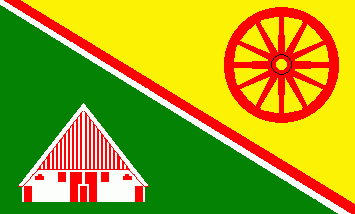
- Flag Coat of arms

- Location of Groß Nordende within Pinneberg district
- Interactive map of Groß Nordende
- Location within Germany Location within Schleswig-Holstein
- Coordinates: 53°42′N 9°39′E
- Country: Germany
- State: Schleswig-Holstein
- District: Pinneberg
- Municipal assoc.: Geest und Marsch Südholstein

Government
  - Mayor: Ute Ehmke

Area
  - Total: 5.63 km^{2} (2.17 sq mi)
- Elevation: 7 m (23 ft)

Population (2025-12-31)
  - Total: 804
  - Density: 143/km^{2} (370/sq mi)
- Time zone: UTC+01:00 (CET)
  - Summer (DST): UTC+02:00 (CEST)
- Postal codes: 25436
- Dialling codes: 04122
- Vehicle registration: PI
- Website: www.gross-nordende.de

Groß Nordende is a municipality in the district of Pinneberg, in Schleswig-Holstein, Germany.
