= Haseldorf =

Municipality in Schleswig-Holstein, Germany

- Municipality
- Coat of arms

- Location of Haseldorf within Pinneberg district
- Interactive map of Haseldorf
- Location within Germany Location within Schleswig-Holstein
- Coordinates: 53°37′N 9°36′E
- Country: Germany
- State: Schleswig-Holstein
- District: Pinneberg
- Municipal assoc.: Geest und Marsch Südholstein

Government
  - Mayor: Daniel Kullig

Area
  - Total: 18.08 km^{2} (6.98 sq mi)
- Elevation: 1 m (3.3 ft)

Population (2025-12-31)
  - Total: 1,821
  - Density: 100.7/km^{2} (260.9/sq mi)
- Time zone: UTC+01:00 (CET)
  - Summer (DST): UTC+02:00 (CEST)
- Postal codes: 25489
- Dialling codes: 04122, 04129
- Vehicle registration: PI
- Website: www.amt-haseldorf.de

Haseldorf (German pronunciation: [ˈhaːzl̩dɔʁf]) is a municipality in the district of Pinneberg, in Schleswig-Holstein, Germany. It is situated on the right bank of the Elbe, approx. 13 km west of Pinneberg, and 27 km west of Hamburg.

Haseldorf was the seat of the former Amt ("collective municipality") of Haseldorf.
