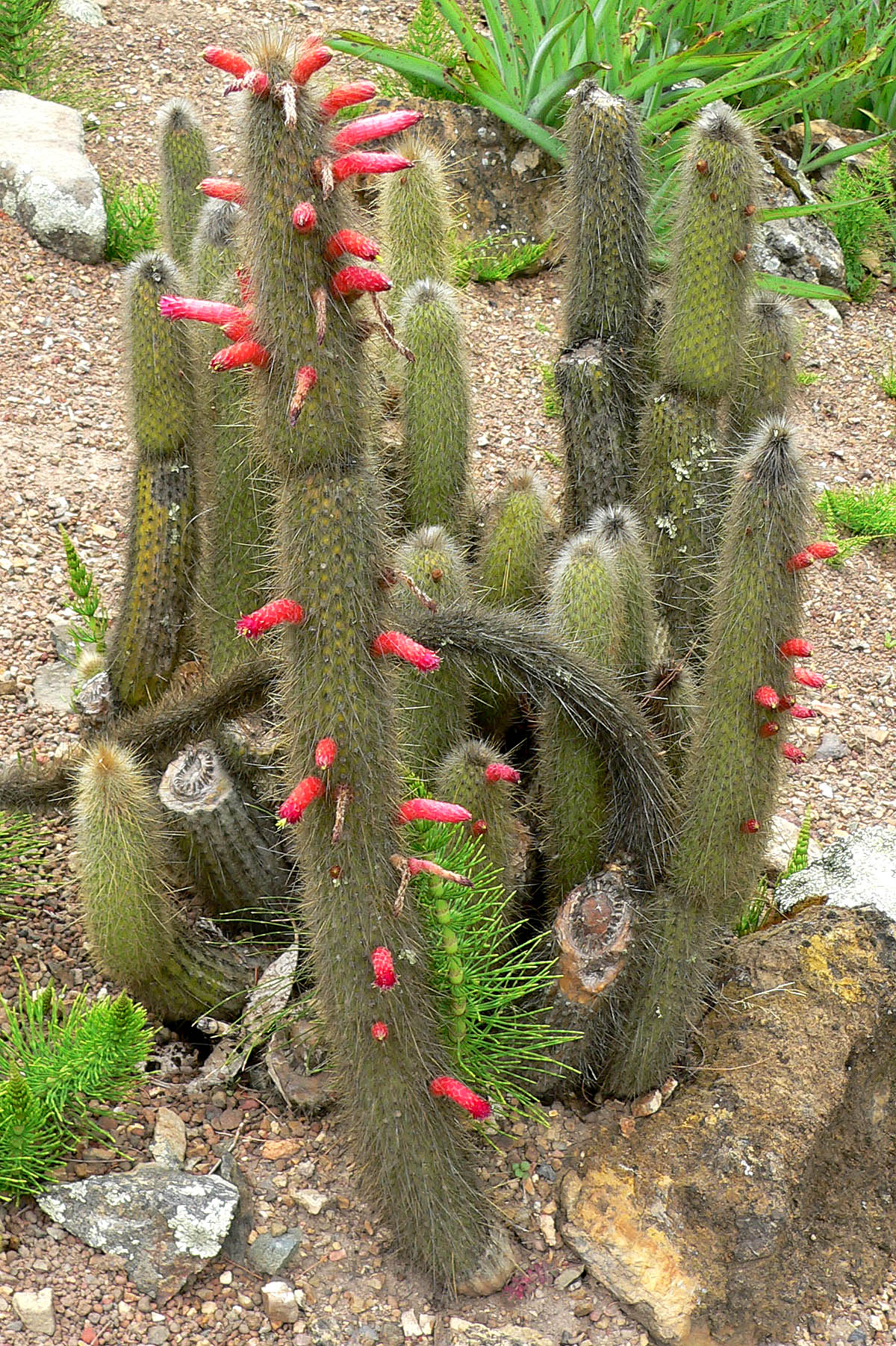

Conservation status
- Least Concern (IUCN 3.1)

Scientific classification
- Kingdom: Plantae
- Clade: Tracheophytes
- Clade: Angiosperms
- Clade: Eudicots
- Order: Caryophyllales
- Family: Cactaceae
- Subfamily: Cactoideae
- Genus: Cleistocactus
- Species: C. hyalacanthus

Binomial name
- Cleistocactus hyalacanthus (K.Schum.) Rol.-Goss.

Synonyms
- List: Cleistocactus tarijensis Cárdenas; Cereus hyalacanthus K.Schum., 1897 syn. sec. Kiesling & al. 2014; Cleistocactus hyalacanthus subsp. hyalacanthus syn. sec. Kiesling & al. 2014; Demnosa strausii var. luteispina Frič (2019); Pilocereus strausii var. fricii Dörfl. (2019); Cleistocactus strausii var. fricii (Dörfl.) Backeb.,(2019); Cleistocactus strausii var. jujuyensis Backeb. 1934; Cleistocactus jujuyensis (Backeb.) Backeb. 2014; Pilocereus jujuyensis (Backeb.) Anon. 2014; Cleistocactus hyalacanthus Backeb., V2019; Cleistocactus tarijensis Cárdenas 2014; Cleistocactus hyalacanthus subsp. tarijensis (Cárdenas) Mottram 2014; Cleistocactus compactus Backeb. 1957 ["1956"] syn. sec. Kiesling & al. 2014; Cleistocactus jujuyensis var. fulvus F.Ritter, 1980 syn. sec. Kew WCVP (2019); Echinopsis nothohyalacantha Anceschi & Magli 2013 syn. sec. Kiesling & al. 2014

= Cleistocactus hyalacanthus =

Species of plant

Cleistocactus hyalacanthus is a species of columnar cacti in the genus Cleistocactus. The name comes from the Greek kleistos meaning closed because the flowers hardly open.

== Description ==
Cleistocactus hyalacanthus grows as a shrub with erect shoots that branch out from the base and reach heights of up to 1 meter with a diameter of 4 to 6 cm (1.6 to 2.4 in) with 15 to 20 ribs with areoles 5–8 mm (0.31 in) apart. The approximately 3 central spines are brown to yellowish and up to 3 cm (1.2 in) long. The 20 to 30 unequal fine radial spines are bristly and whitish. Flowers sprout from the center of needle clusters near the apex of the stem. They first appear as small dark spots, which gradually enlarge over a week or ten days into purple-pink flowers are 3.5 to 4 cm (1.4 to 1.6 in) long and 5–7 mm (0.28 in) wide, each of which is only open, and only slightly, for one day. Their bracts are spread out. They are food for hummingbirds, which are attracted by the vivid red color. Those flowers that have been fertilized will develop a fruit. The spherical fruits are light greenish, brick-red to orange fruits reach a diameter of about 1 to 1.2 cm (0.39 to 0.47 in) and contain white flesh. The fruits eventually turn yellow when they are ripe. They are food for larger birds, which disperse the small black seeds in their droppings.

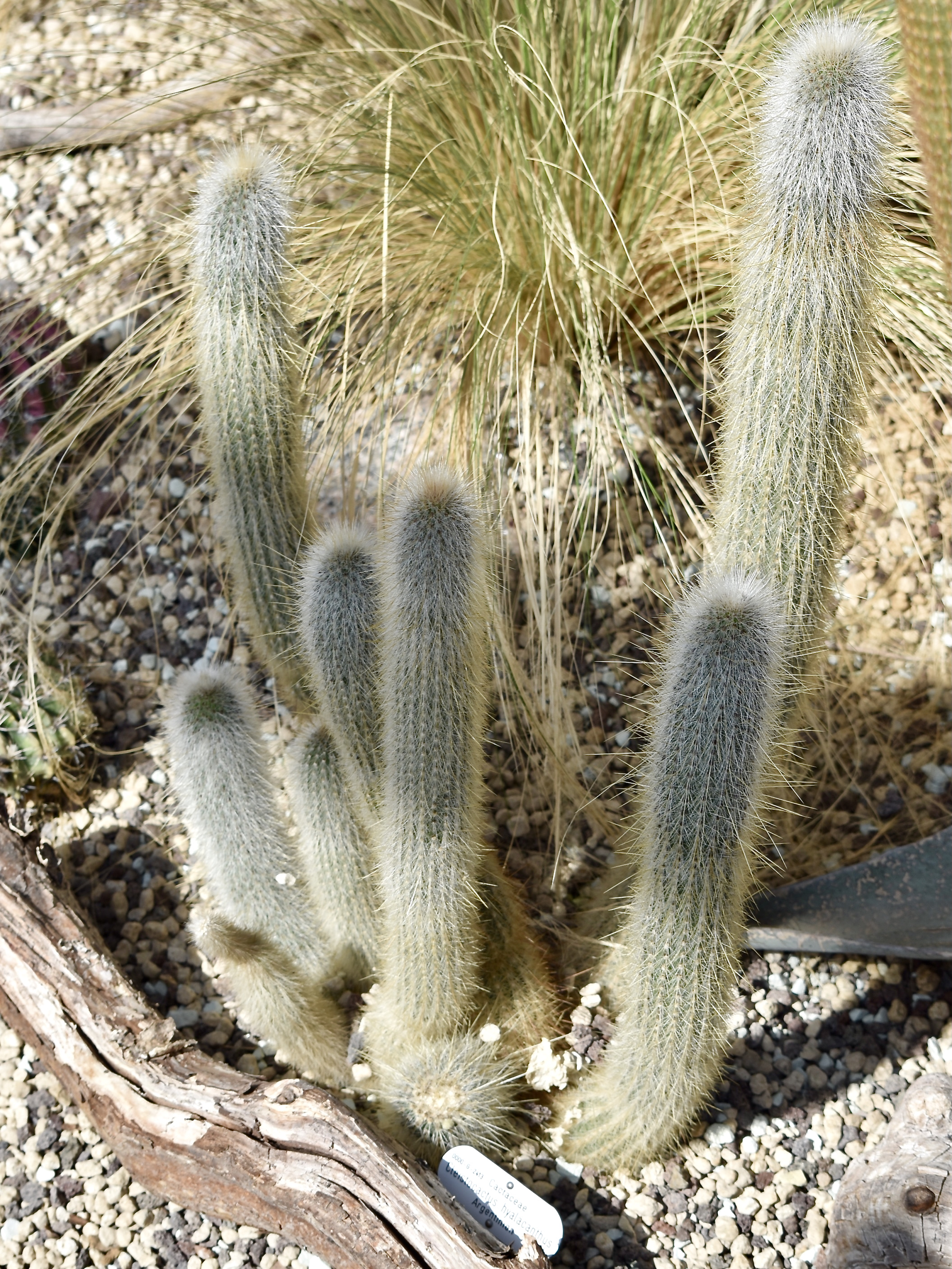
Plant

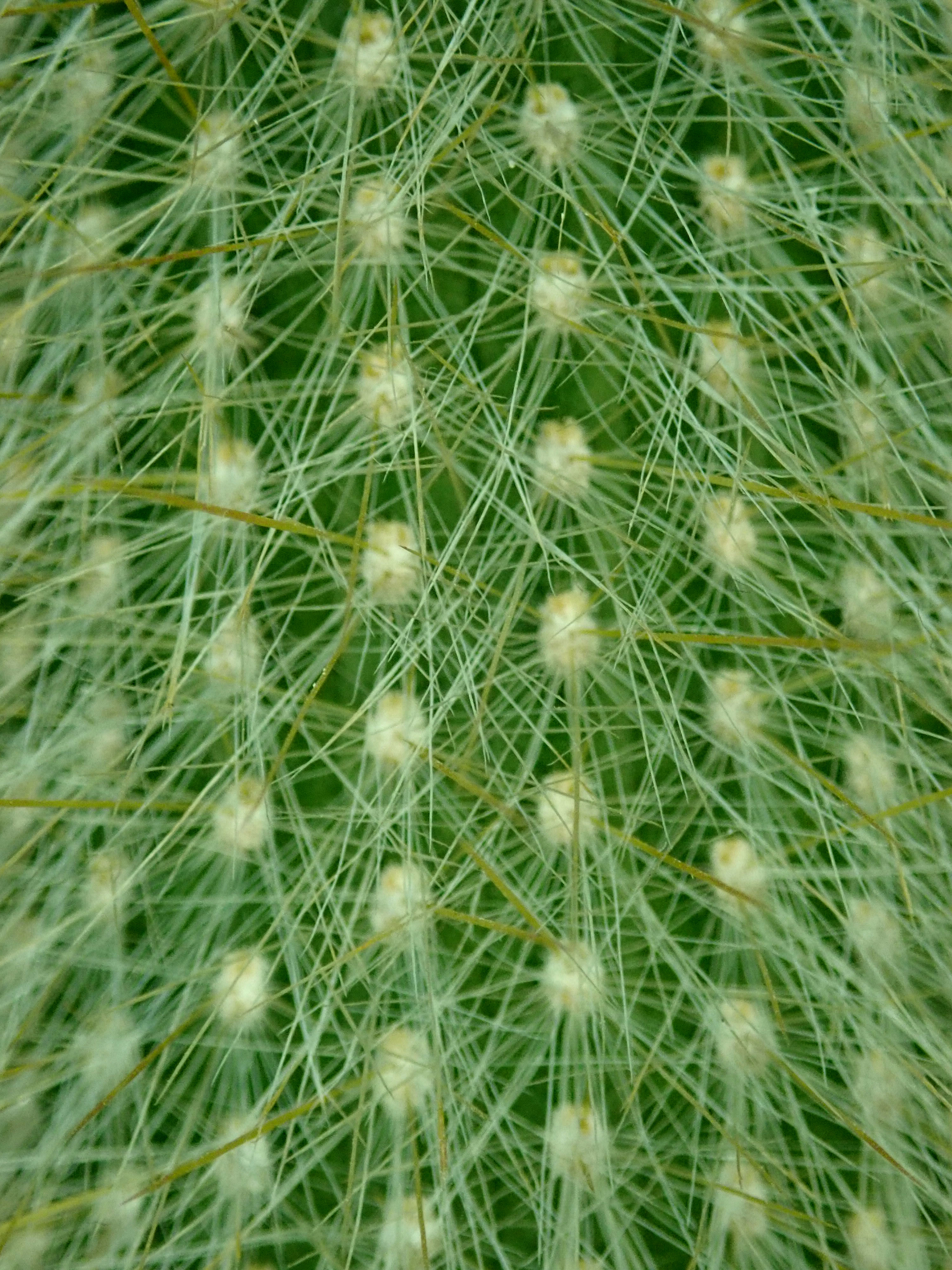
Spines

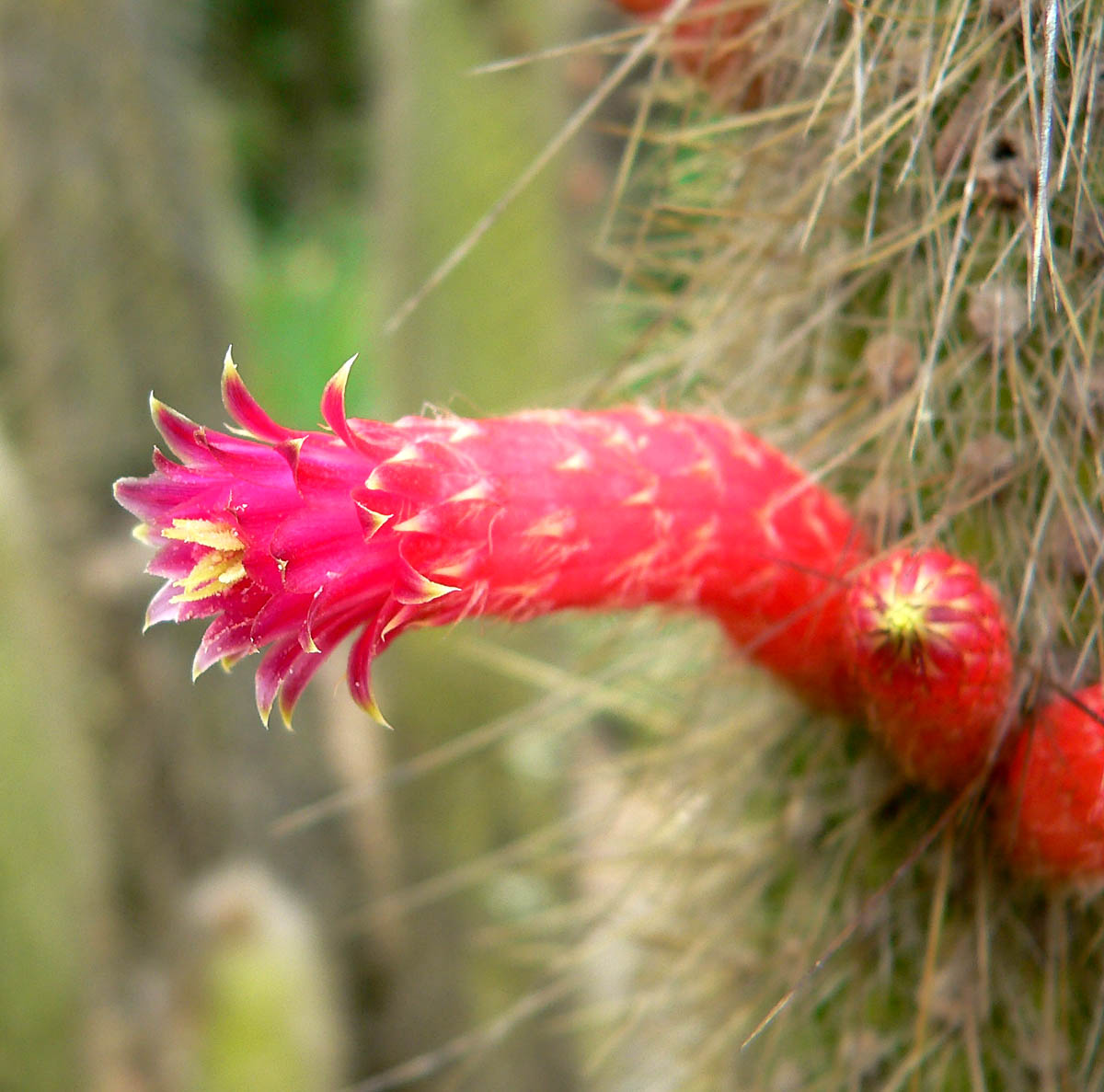
single Flower

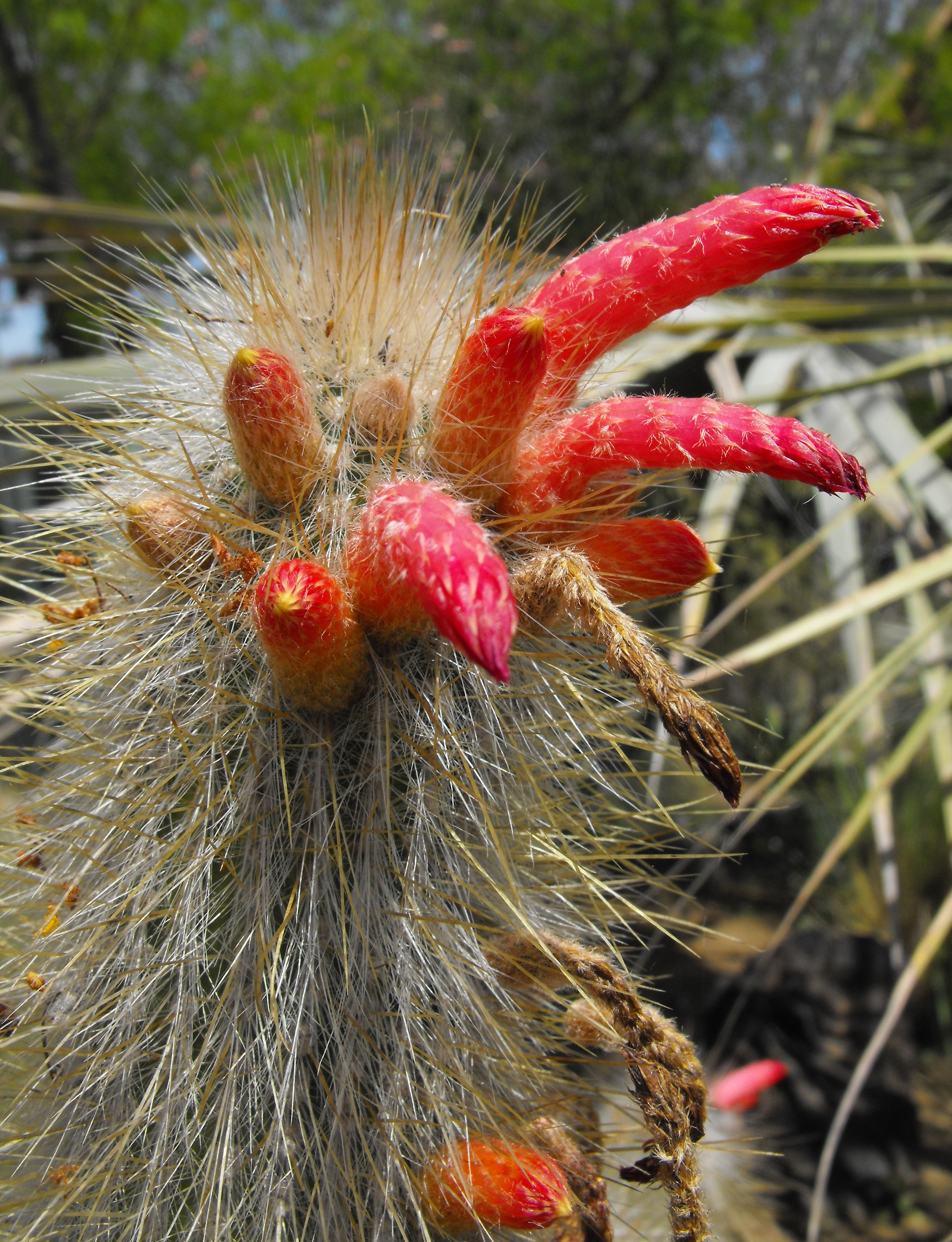
Blooming

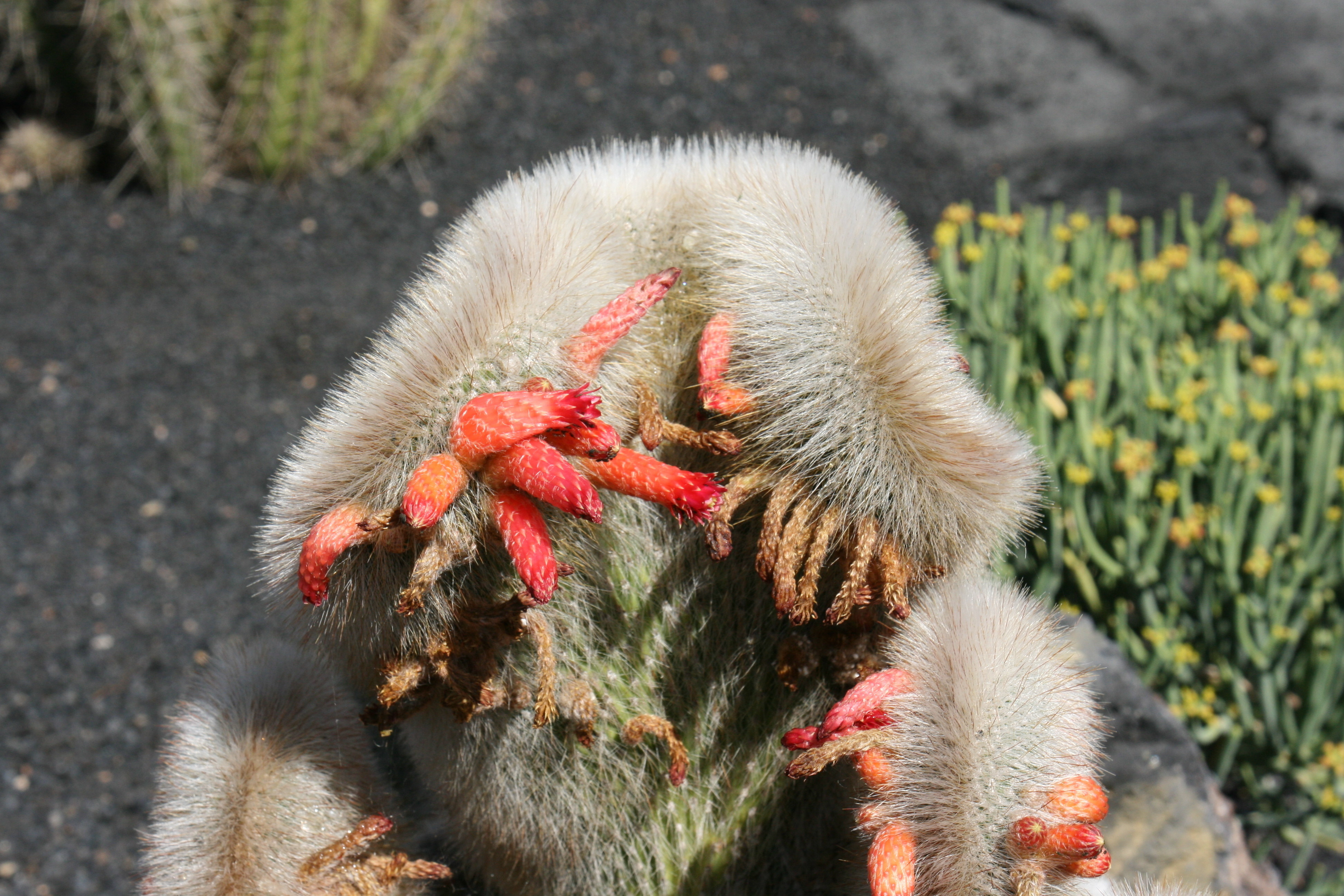
Crested Plant

== Distribution ==
Cleistocactus hyalacanthus is distributed in the wooded dry forest of the Argentinian provinces of Salta and Jujuy at altitudes of 1700 to 3100 meters and possibly in southern Bolivia.

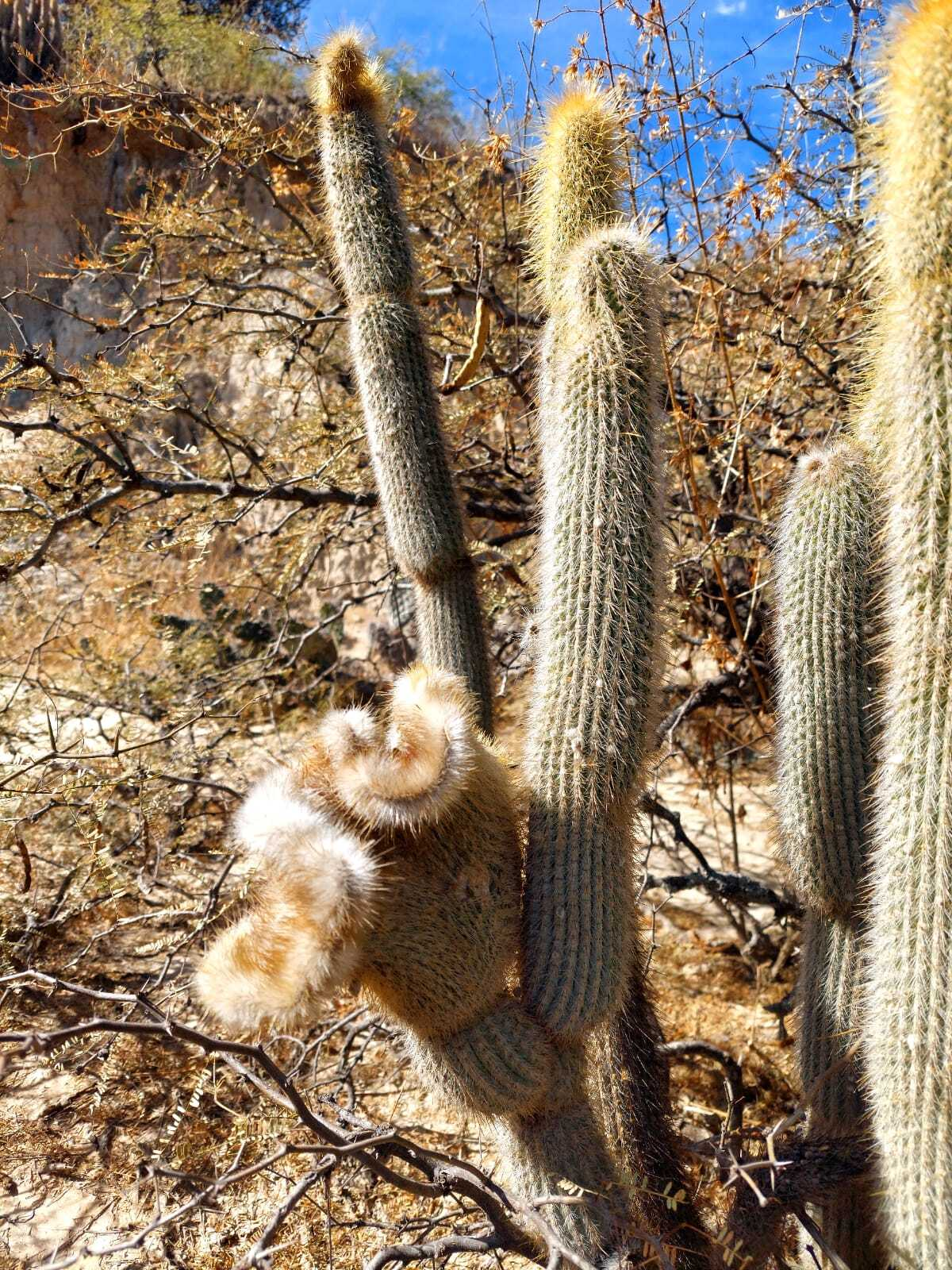
Habitat in Tarija, Bolivia

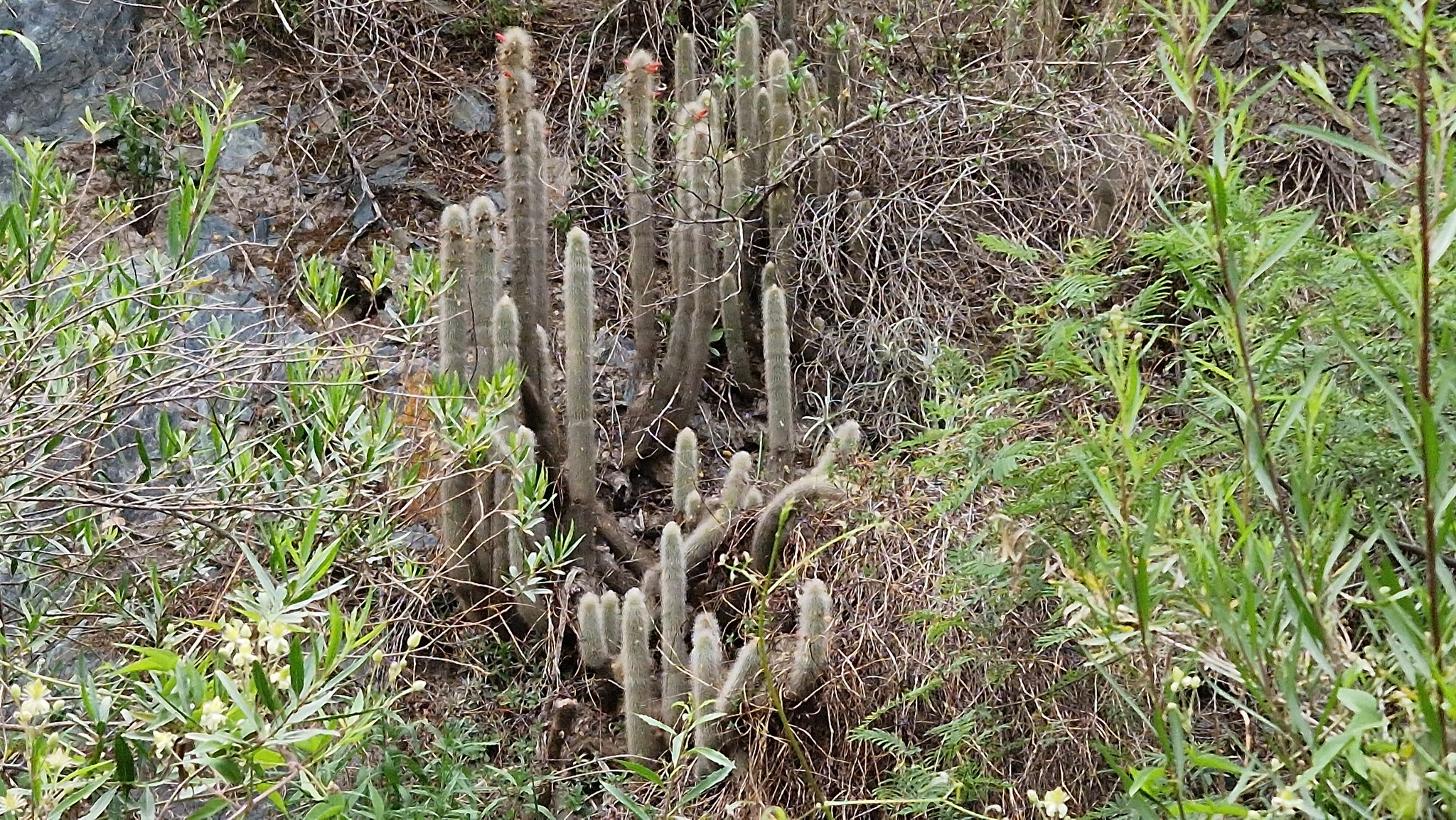
Plant growing in El Alisal, Salta Province, Argentina

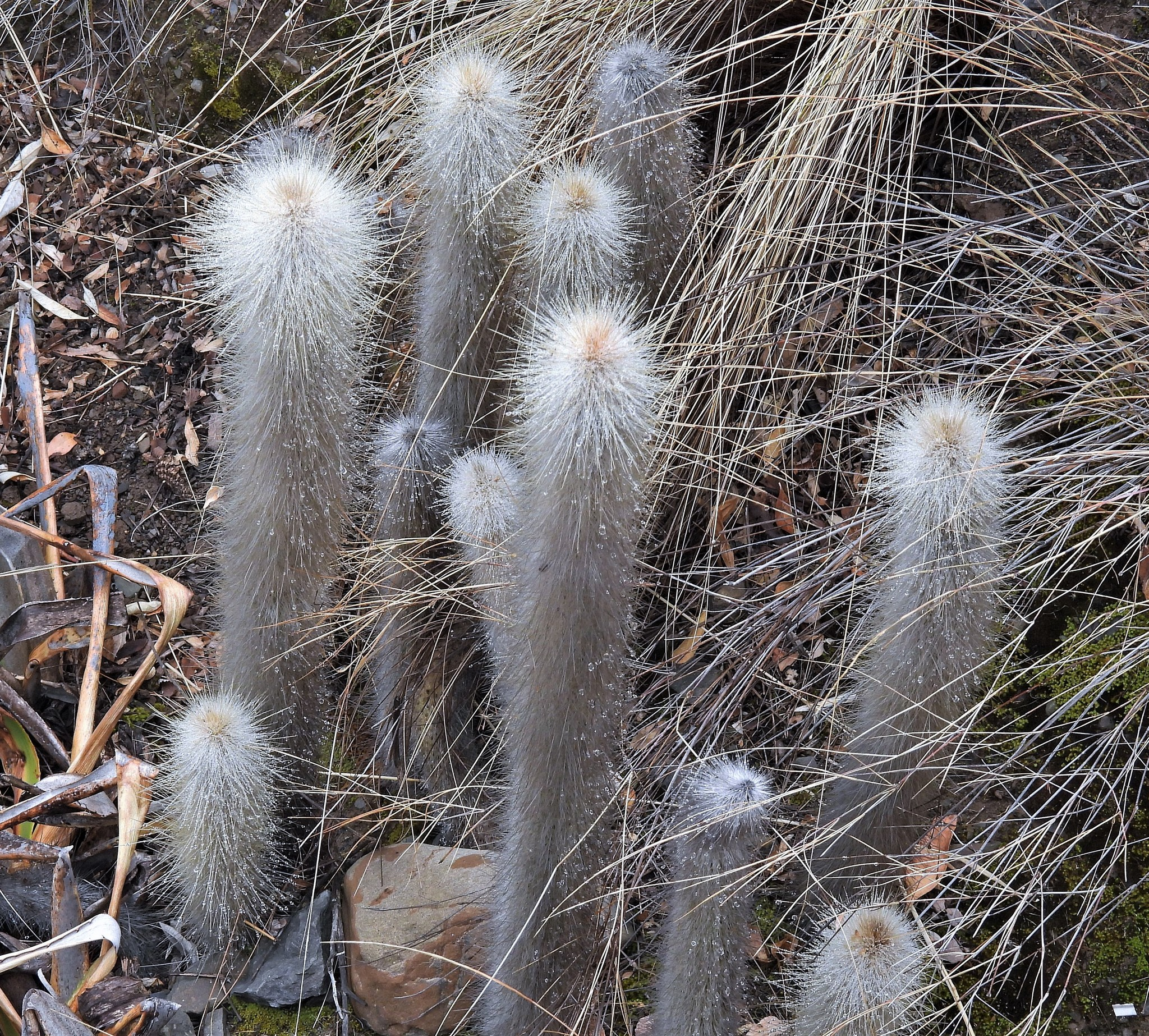
Habitat in Caspalá, Jujuy, Argentina

== Taxonomy ==
This species was first described as Cereus hyalacanthus was made in 1897 by Karl Moritz Schumann. The plants are named after its glass-like spines. Robert Roland-Gosselin placed the species in the genus Cleistocactus in 1904.

In the IUCN Red List of Threatened Species, the species is listed as "Least Concern (LC)".
