= Geest und Marsch Südholstein =

- Amt
- Map of Pinneberg highlighting Geest und Marsch Südholstein
- Interactive map of Geest und Marsch Südholstein
- Location within Germany Location within Schleswig-Holstein
- Coordinates: 53°39′N 9°39′E
- Country: Germany
- State: Schleswig-Holstein
- District: Pinneberg
- Seat: Moorrege
- Subdivisions: 10 municipalities

Government
  - Mayor: Frank Wulff

Area
  - Total: 137.7 km^{2} (53.2 sq mi)

Population (2025-12-31)
  - Total: 24,358
  - Density: 176.9/km^{2} (458.1/sq mi)
- Time zone: UTC+01:00 (CET)
  - Summer (DST): UTC+02:00 (CEST)
- Website: www.amt-geest-und-marsch-suedholstein.de

Geest und Marsch Südholstein (before 1 January 2017: Moorrege) is an Amt ("collective municipality") in the district of Pinneberg, in Schleswig-Holstein, Germany. The seat of the Amt is in Moorrege.

The Amt Geest und Marsch Südholstein consists of the following municipalities:

1. Appen
2. Groß Nordende
3. Haselau
4. Haseldorf
5. Heidgraben
6. Heist
7. Hetlingen
8. Holm
9. Moorrege
10. Neuendeich
