= Hetlingen =

Municipality in Schleswig-Holstein, Germany

- Municipality
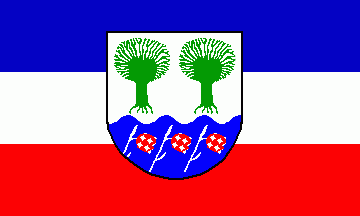
- Flag Coat of arms

- Location of Hetlingen within Pinneberg district
- Interactive map of Hetlingen
- Location within Germany Location within Schleswig-Holstein
- Coordinates: 53°36′N 9°38′E
- Country: Germany
- State: Schleswig-Holstein
- District: Pinneberg
- Municipal assoc.: Geest und Marsch Südholstein

Government
  - Mayor: Michael Rahn

Area
  - Total: 24.1 km^{2} (9.3 sq mi)
- Elevation: 0 m (0 ft)

Population (2025-12-31)
  - Total: 1,451
  - Density: 60.2/km^{2} (156/sq mi)
- Time zone: UTC+01:00 (CET)
  - Summer (DST): UTC+02:00 (CEST)
- Postal codes: 25491
- Dialling codes: 04103
- Vehicle registration: PI
- Website: www.amt-haseldorf.de

Hetlingen is a municipality in the district of Pinneberg in the German state of Schleswig-Holstein. Hetlingen is the site of Elbe Crossing 1 and Elbe Crossing 2, two power line crossings across the river Elbe. The pylons of Elbe Crossing 2 are the highest pylons in Europe. Hetlingen also has the largest sewage treatment in the state of Schleswig-Holstein, treating the wastewater of several districts with a total population of about 450,000.
