= Appen =

- Municipality
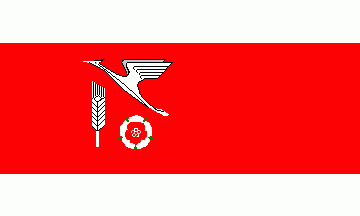
- Flag Coat of arms

- Location of Appen within Pinneberg district
- Interactive map of Appen
- Location within Germany Location within Schleswig-Holstein
- Coordinates: 53°39′42″N 9°44′40″E
- Country: Germany
- State: Schleswig-Holstein
- District: Pinneberg
- Municipal assoc.: Geest und Marsch Südholstein
- Subdivisions: 3

Government
  - Mayor: Hans-Joachim Banaschak

Area
  - Total: 20.3 km^{2} (7.8 sq mi)
- Elevation: 6 m (20 ft)

Population (2025-12-31)
  - Total: 4,823
  - Density: 238/km^{2} (615/sq mi)
- Time zone: UTC+01:00 (CET)
  - Summer (DST): UTC+02:00 (CEST)
- Postal codes: 25480–25482
- Dialling codes: 04101, 04122
- Vehicle registration: PI

Appen (German pronunciation: [ˈapn̩]) is a municipality in the district of Pinneberg, in Schleswig-Holstein, Germany. It is situated approximately 3 km west of Pinneberg, and 20 km northwest of Hamburg.

The municipality is known for its annual Appen musiziert benefit concerts.

It is twinned with the village of Polegate, near Eastbourne in East Sussex, England.
