= Haselau =

Municipality in Schleswig-Holstein, Germany

- Municipality
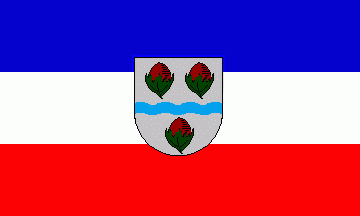
- Flag Coat of arms

- Location of Haselau within Pinneberg district
- Interactive map of Haselau
- Location within Germany Location within Schleswig-Holstein
- Coordinates: 53°39′44″N 9°37′29″E
- Country: Germany
- State: Schleswig-Holstein
- District: Pinneberg
- Municipal assoc.: Geest und Marsch Südholstein

Government
  - Mayor: Rolf Herrmann (CDU)

Area
  - Total: 18.88 km^{2} (7.29 sq mi)
- Elevation: 1 m (3.3 ft)

Population (2025-12-31)
  - Total: 1,127
  - Density: 59.69/km^{2} (154.6/sq mi)
- Time zone: UTC+01:00 (CET)
  - Summer (DST): UTC+02:00 (CEST)
- Postal codes: 25489
- Dialling codes: 04129, 04122
- Vehicle registration: PI
- Website: www.amt-haseldorf.de

Haselau is a municipality in the district of Pinneberg, in Schleswig-Holstein, Germany.
