= Moorrege =

Municipality in Schleswig-Holstein, Germany

- Municipality
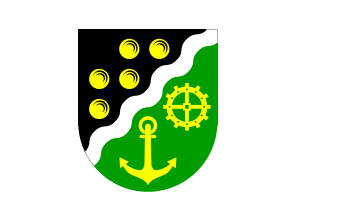
- Flag Coat of arms

- Location of Moorrege within Pinneberg district
- Interactive map of Moorrege
- Location within Germany Location within Schleswig-Holstein
- Coordinates: 53°40′N 9°40′E
- Country: Germany
- State: Schleswig-Holstein
- District: Pinneberg
- Municipal assoc.: Geest und Marsch Südholstein

Government
  - Mayor: Wolfgang Balasus (CDU)

Area
  - Total: 10.76 km^{2} (4.15 sq mi)
- Elevation: 8 m (26 ft)

Population (2025-12-31)
  - Total: 4,633
  - Density: 430.6/km^{2} (1,115/sq mi)
- Time zone: UTC+01:00 (CET)
  - Summer (DST): UTC+02:00 (CEST)
- Postal codes: 25436
- Dialling codes: 04122
- Vehicle registration: PI
- Website: www.amt-moorrege.de

Moorrege, located 30 kilometres (19 mi) north west of Hamburg at the small river Pinnau, close to the Elbe river, is a municipality in the district of Pinneberg, in Schleswig-Holstein, Germany. Moorrege is around 2.7 kilometres (1.7 mi) south of Uetersen.

Moorrege is the seat of the Amt ("collective municipality") Geest und Marsch Südholstein.

The municipality is known as the birthplace of purported Nazi-resister August Landmesser.
