= Sophie Wörishöffer =

German writer

Sophie Wörishöffer, or Sophie Andresen (6 October 1838 in Pinneberg – 8 November 1890 in Altona, Hamburg) was a German writer of over a dozen adventure stories for young people.

== Reception ==
Though popular among their readership, and defended by modern scholars such as Karin Tuxhorn seeing Wörishöffer as apolitical, not racist - 'completely ordinary zeitgeist, it barely trouble anyone...', Wörishöffer's books were attacked by her contemporaries like Heinrich Wolgast - '... one often has the impression the author has written down his incredible tales with a certain satisfied mocking smile in the face of the credulous stupidity of the reading public. The same feeling is forced upon us time and time again with Wörishöffer. One impossibility is replaced by the next.'

== Works ==
- Wiederschen in Australien (1888)
- Das Naturforscherschiff, oder, Fahrt der Jungen Hamburger mit der Hammonia nach den Besitzungen ihres Vaters in der Südsee (1880)
