= Pinneberg =

- Town
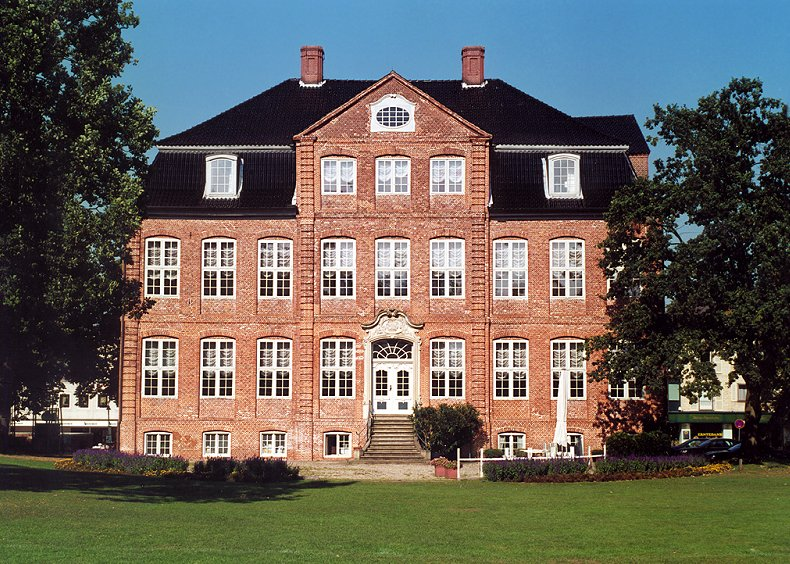

- Flag Coat of arms

- Location of Pinneberg within Pinneberg district
- Interactive map of Pinneberg
- Location within Germany Location within Schleswig-Holstein
- Coordinates: 53°38′N 9°48′E
- Country: Germany
- State: Schleswig-Holstein
- District: Pinneberg

Government
  - Mayor: Urte Steinberg

Area
  - Total: 21.54 km^{2} (8.32 sq mi)
- Elevation: 9 m (30 ft)

Population (2025-12-31)
  - Total: 44,941
  - Density: 2,086/km^{2} (5,404/sq mi)
- Time zone: UTC+01:00 (CET)
  - Summer (DST): UTC+02:00 (CEST)
- Postal codes: 25401–25421
- Dialling codes: 04101
- Vehicle registration: PI
- Website: www.pinneberg.de

Pinneberg (German: [ˈpɪnəbɛʁk]; Northern Low Saxon: Pinnbarg) is a town in the federal state of Schleswig-Holstein in northern Germany. It is the capital of the district of Pinneberg and has a population of about 43,500 inhabitants. Pinneberg is located 18 km northwest of the city centre of Hamburg.

Near Pinneberg is the transmission site for the maritime weather radioteletype and radiofax service DDH47, operating on 147.3 kHz. A T-aerial is used, strung between two guyed masts.

== History ==
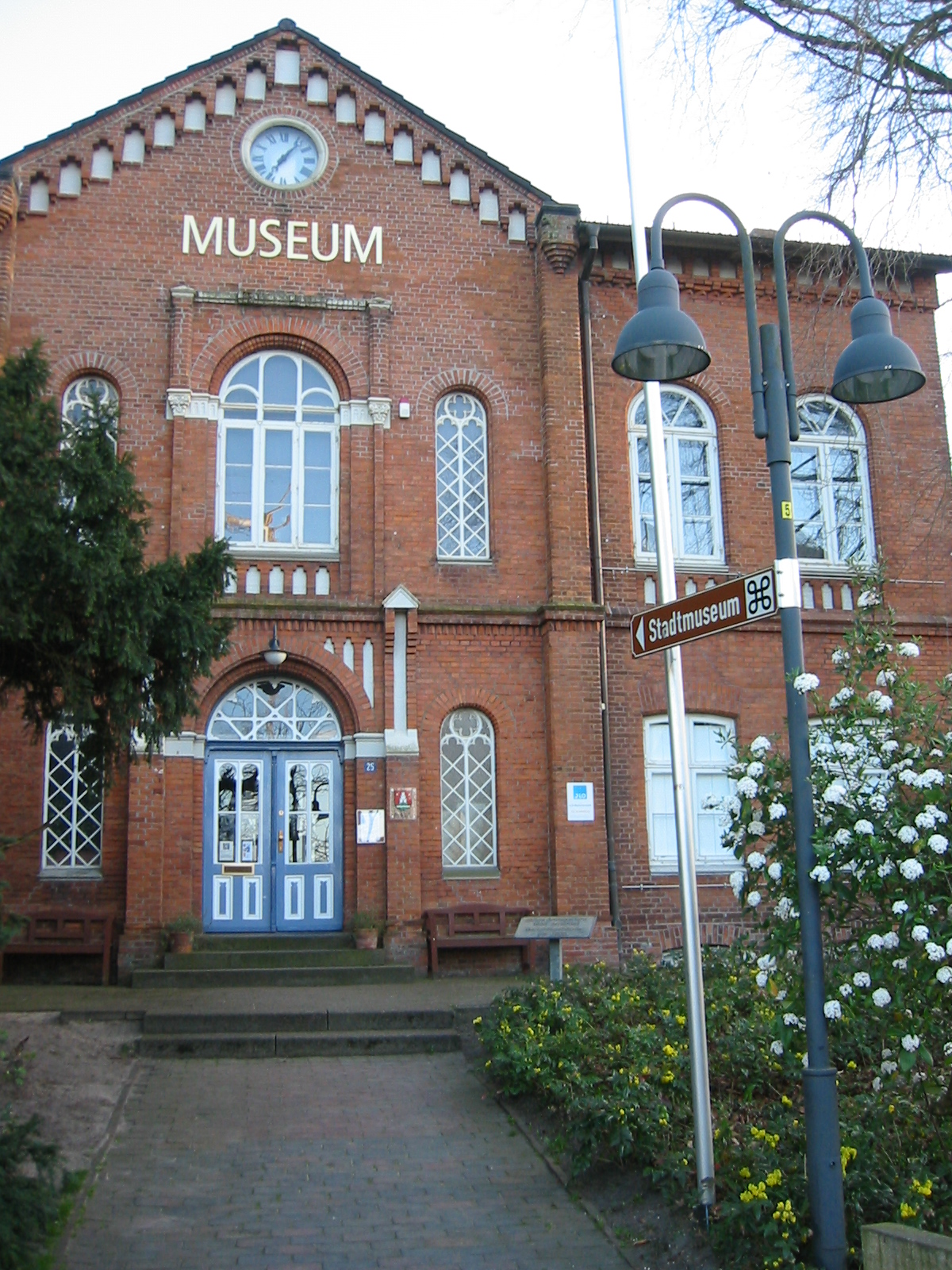
Local museum

When a castle was first built in Pinneberg around the year 1200 AD, the site had already been used as a Germanic Thingstätte for several centuries. In 1370 the castle was captured by Count Adolf VIII of Schauenburg and Holstein-Pinneberg.

In 1397 Pinneberg was first mentioned in official documents as a seat of courts.

In 1472 a Renaissance castle was built in place of the old castle. It was heavily damaged in 1627 and 1657 and was finally torn down in 1720. Between 1765 and 1767 the Drostei was built for the Drost Hans von Ahlefeldt. This brick building, which was probably erected by Ernst Georg Sonnin, is the most important example of Baroque architecture in the district of Pinneberg.

After some servants and craftsmen had settled in the vicinity of the castle, the settlement expanded slowly, only receiving municipal rights in 1875, although it had been the seat of the Danish 'Landdrost' since 1640 and seat of the Prussian district administrator since 1866 within the Province of Schleswig-Holstein.

In 1905 the settlement of ‘Pinneberger Dorf’ was incorporated and in 1927 the villages of Thesdorf and Waldenau followed.

After World War II the number of inhabitants of Pinneberg doubled because of the forced immigration of expellees, predominantly from East Prussia. Later on, in contrast to many other cities in Schleswig-Holstein, Pinneberg was able to keep the number of inhabitants stable.

== Population ==
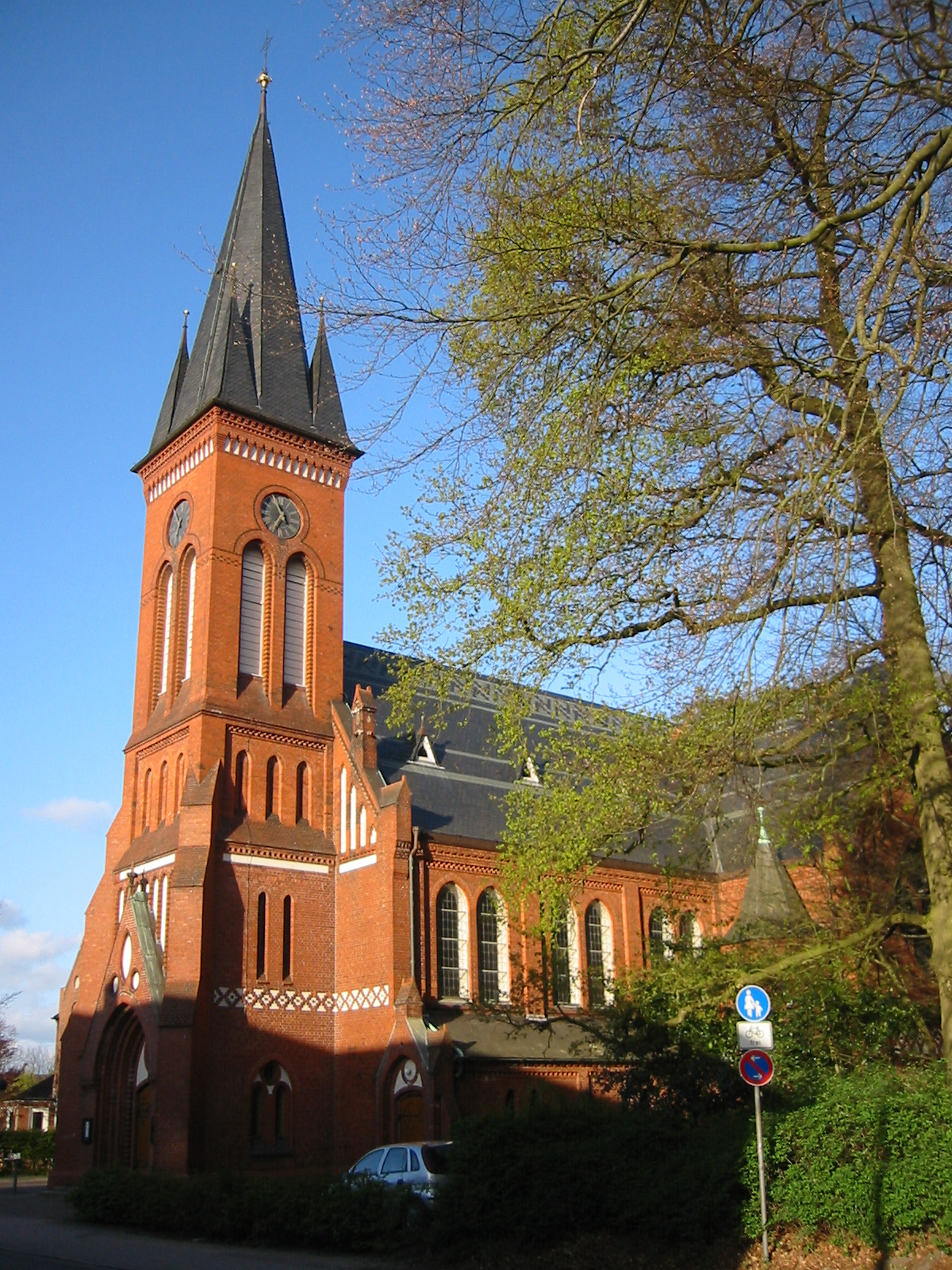
Christ church (Christuskirche)

- 1824 – 900
- 1875 – 3,060
- 1905 – 6,074 (incorporation of Pinnebergerdorf adding 1,500 inhabitants)
- 1927 – 7,903 (incorporation of Thesdorf adding 1,313 inhabitants)
- 1939 – 13,494
- 1948 – 24,885
- 1955 – 25,161
- 1970 – 36,002
- 1990 – 37,134
- 2000 – 39,423
- 2002 – 39,905
- 2004 – 41,063
- 2006 – 41,972
- 2008 – 42,367
- 2010 – 40,988
- 2012 – 41,726
- 2014 – 42,002
- 2020 – 43,503

== Mayors ==
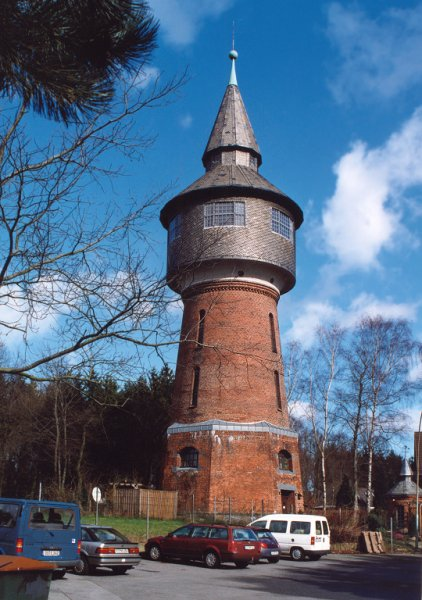
Former water tower

- 1876–1901: Christoph Kosack (independent)
- 1901–1923: Franz Heinsohn
- 1923–1933: Wilhelm Burmeister (SPD)
- 1933–1937: Heinrich Backhaus (NSDAP)
- 1937–1945: Karl Coors (NSDAP)
- 1945: Dietmar Petersen (independent)
- 1945–1950: Richard Köhn (SPD)
- 1950–1963: Henry Glissmann (SPD)
- 1963–1990: Hans-Hermann Kath (independent)
- 1990–1996: Jan Nevermann (SPD)
- 1996–2008: Horst-Werner Nitt (independent)
- 2008–2012: Kristin Alheit (SPD)
- 2012: Klaus Seyfert (CDU, temporary)
- 2013-2024: Urte Steinberg (independent)
- since 2024 Thomas Voerste (independent)

== Transport ==
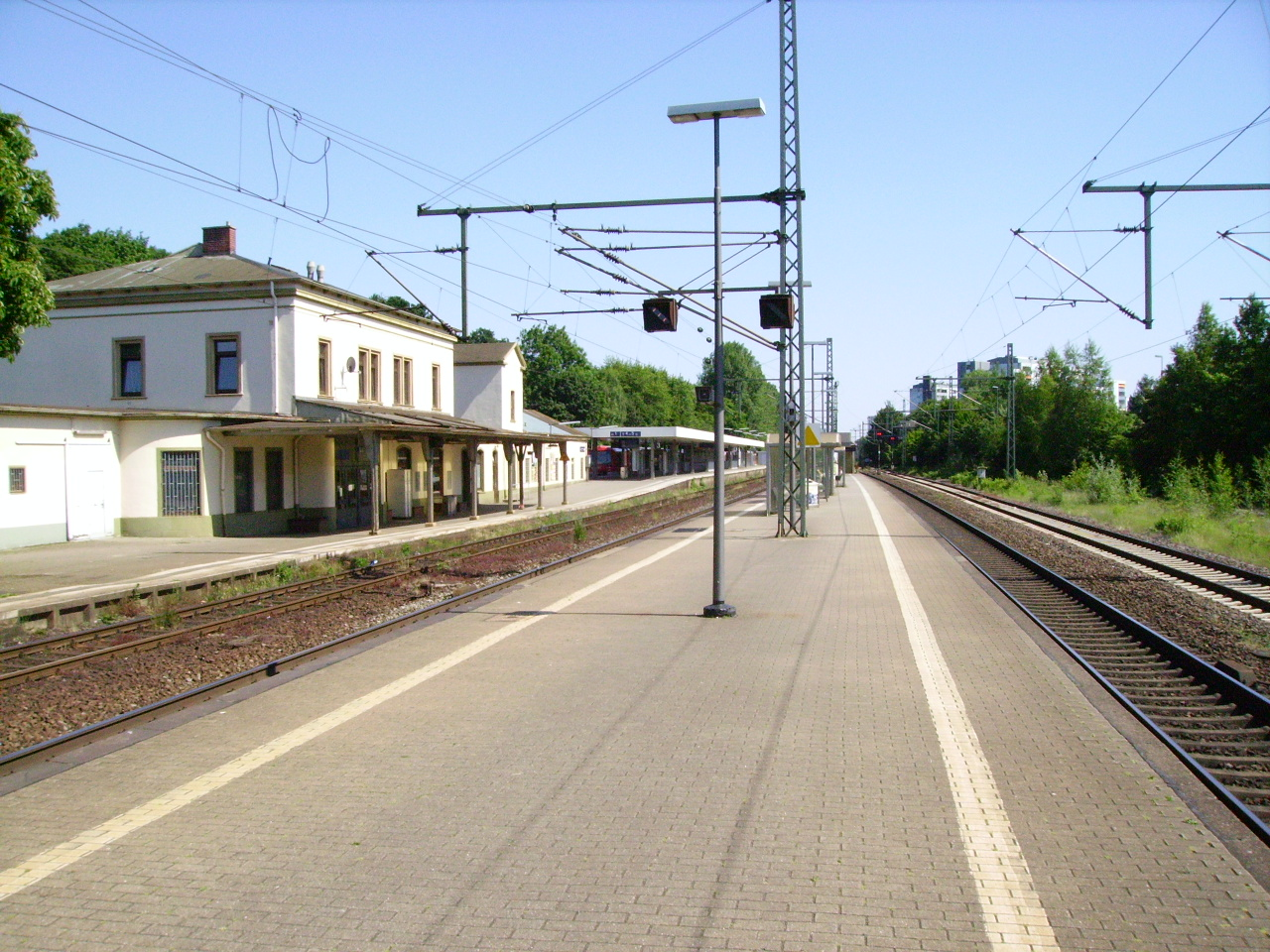
Pinneberg station

Many regional trains stop at Pinneberg railway station, which serves as the terminus of line S3 of the Hamburg S-Bahn rapid transit network. A second S-Bahn station – Thesdorf – is also located within Pinneberg. There were plans for a third station in northwestern Pinneberg which are linked to the project of an S3-extension.

The highway A23 passes along the eastern edge of Pinneberg and has three junctions that directly link to the town.

== Twin towns – sister cities ==
Pinneberg is twinned with:

- Rockville, United States

== Notable people ==
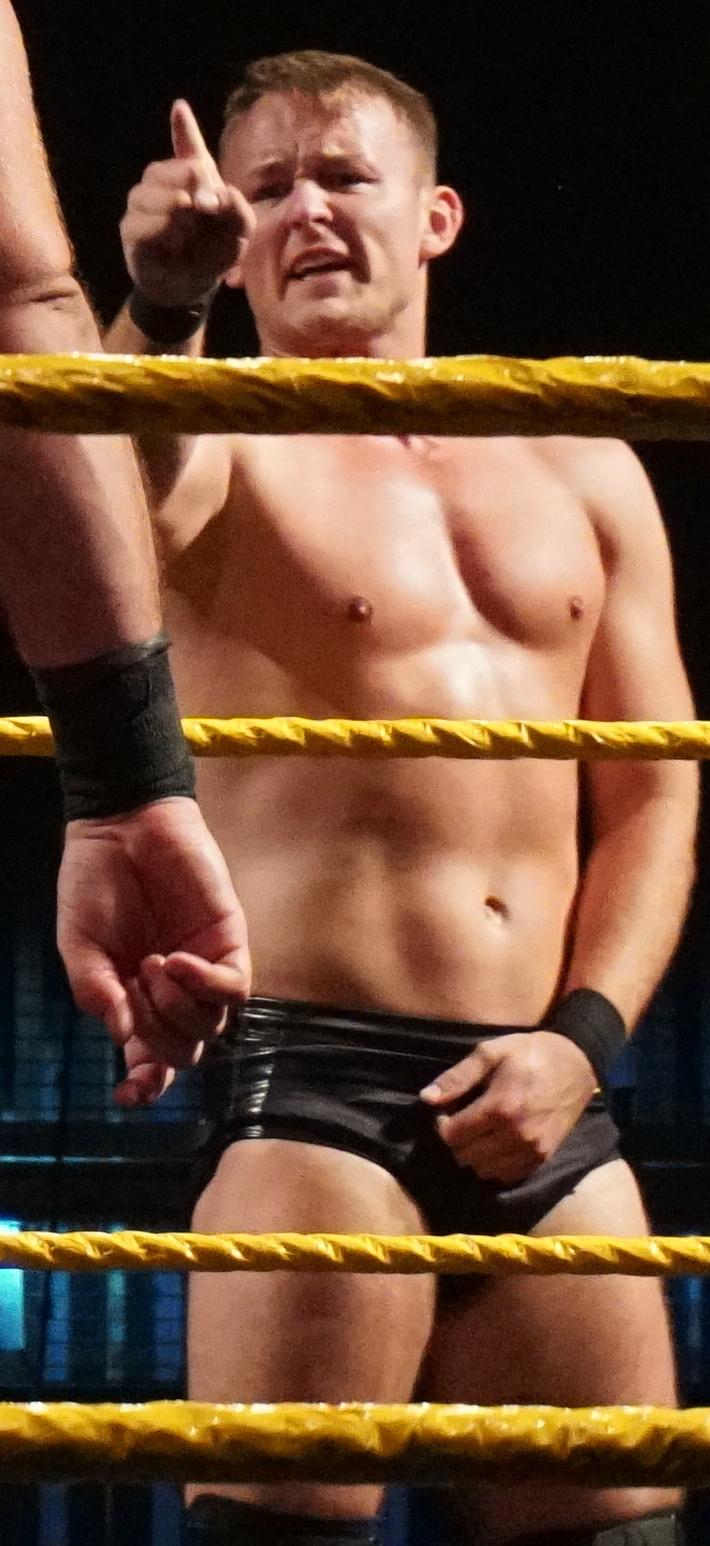
Ludwig Kaiser, 2018

- Ludwig Meyn (1820–1878), agricultural scientist, soil scientist, geologist, journalist and mineralogist
- Sophie Wörishöffer (1838–1890), author
- Carl Schlüter (1848–1884), sculptor
- Bernhard Siebken (1910–1949), SS officer and war criminal
- Johannes Seifert (1915–1943), Luftwaffe military aviator and World War II fighter ace
- Mario Szenessy (1930–1976), Hungarian-German author, translator, and literary critic, died here
- Dirk Penkwitz (born 1969), TV presenter
- Jeanne Goursaud (born 1996), German-French actress.

=== Sport ===
- Michael Westphal (1965–1991), tennis player
- Michael Stich (born 1968), tennis player
- Jonatan Kotzke (born 1990) footballer, played over 300 pro games
- Marcel Barthel (born 1990), professional wrestler, uses the ring name Ludwig Kaiser.
- Tony Halbig (born 1993), racing driver
- Anneke Borbe (born 2000), footballer
