= Tom Dillmann =

French racing driver

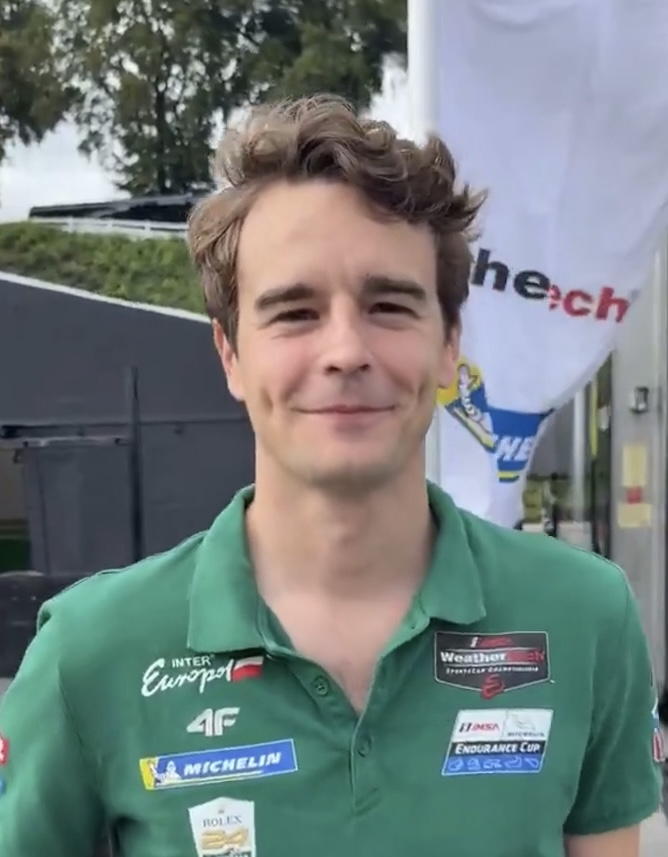
- Dillmann at 2025 Petit Le Mans
- Nationality: (France) French
- Born: Tom Aston Dillmann; 6 April 1989 (age 37) Mulhouse, France

IMSA SportsCar Championship career
- Debut season: 2024
- Current team: Inter Europol Competition
- Categorisation: FIA Silver (2015); FIA Gold (2016–)
- Car number: 43
- Starts: 20
- Wins: 4
- Podiums: 10
- Poles: 6
- Fastest laps: 3
- Best finish: 1st in 2024 (LMP2)

European Le Mans Series career
- Debut season: 2024
- Current team: Inter Europol Competition
- Car number: 43
- Starts: 16
- Wins: 2
- Podiums: 8
- Poles: 1
- Fastest laps: 2
- Best finish: 2nd in 2024-2025 (LMP2)

24 Hours of Le Mans career
- Years: 2018–2020, 2023, 2025
- Teams: ByKolles Racing, Vanwall Racing Team, Inter Europol Competition
- Best finish: 1st (2025)
- Class wins: 1 (2025)

Previous series
- 2012–14 2011 2011 2009–2011 2008, 2010 2007–09, 2011 2005–06 2005–06 2004 2004 2004: GP2 Series; GP3 Series; FIA Formula 3 International Trophy; German Formula Three; Italian Formula Three; Formula 3 Euro Series; Eurocup Formula Renault 2.0; French Formula Renault 2.0; Formula Renault 1600 Belgium; Formula Renault Monza; Formula Junior 1600 Spain

Championship titles
- 2024 2022 2016 2010: IMSA SportsCar Championship - LMP2; Le Mans Cup; Formula V8 3.5; German Formula Three

Tom Aston Dillmann (born 6 April 1989 in Mulhouse) is a French racing driver who competes for Inter Europol Competition in the 24 Hours of Le Mans, IMSA SportsCar Championship and in the European Le Mans Series. Dillman is also the reserve driver for the Ford Racing FIA World Endurance Championship Hypercar team and the reserve and simulator driver for the Jaguar Racing Formula E team.

Dillmann's most notable accolades include victories in the 2025 and 2026 editions of the 24 Hours of Le Mans in the LMP2 class, championship of the 2024 IMSA SportsCar Championship, overall victory in the 2022 Le Mans Cup, winning the Formula V8 3.5 Championship in the 2016 season and German Formula Three Championship in the 2010 season.

== Career ==
=== Feeder series (2004–2016) ===
==== Karting and Formula Renault (2000–2006) ====
As the son of retired racing driver, mechanic and team manager Gerard Dillmann, Tom Dillmann started his career by winning the regional Alsace soapbox championship in 1999. He raced go-karts from 2000 to 2002 in the minime and junior classes, and won a regional title and also achieved fourth place in the French championship. In that time Dillmann tested a prototype made by his father. He drove the car, powered by a motorbike engine, on circuit and ice.

In 2004, Dillmann entered the Formula Renault 1600 Belgium series with his family-run Tom Team. He finished fifth in the championship with three podiums, including a victory at Spa-Francorchamps. He also contested selected races of the Formula Renault Monza and Formula Junior 1600 Spain championships, taking a podium finish in the latter. Dillmann moved into the Formula Renault Eurocup in 2005, as part of a three-car Prema Powerteam effort alongside Kamui Kobayashi and Patrick Rocha. Dillmann contested the first three meetings with Prema, before moving to Cram Competition for the next two meetings. Having failed to score points to that point, Dillmann elected to stand down from his drive due to a lack of experience. He also contested three meetings of the French championship, but failed to score any points.

Dillmann returned to the European series at the start of the 2006 season; again as part of a three-car team, this time with SG Formula, along with Sten Pentus and Carlo van Dam. Alongside his Eurocup commitments, Dillmann contested the majority of the French Formula Renault Championship. In the Eurocup, Dillmann achieved his first podium at the third meeting of the season, as he finished second behind Dani Clos at Misano. He added two further second places at the final meeting of the season in Barcelona, finishing behind eventual series champion Filipe Albuquerque on both occasions. Dillmann finished eighth in the championship. In the French championship, Dillmann finished in tenth place after taking two consecutive victories late in the season, at Le Mans and Magny-Cours.

==== Formula Three (2007–2011) ====
Prior to the 2007 season, Dillmann became a member of the Red Bull Junior Team, alongside fellow French driver Jean-Karl Vernay. With added financial support from Red Bull, Dillmann entered the Formula 3 Euro Series with ASM, joining Romain Grosjean, Nico Hülkenberg and Kamui Kobayashi at the team. Dillmann missed the opening meeting of the year after a pre-season testing crash left him with a broken sternum and vertebra, but finished the season ninth overall after taking three podiums during the season. Following the season, Dillmann became the rookie driver for A1 Team Switzerland in A1 Grand Prix; he was a member of the team at the Taupo and Eastern Creek rounds in 2008.

Dillmann remained in the Euro Series for the 2008 season, again with Red Bull backing, and rejoined his former Formula Renault team SG Formula, who were moving up to the Euro Series for the first time. Dillmann set the fastest lap on the first day of testing at Estoril, but could not repeat this form early in the season; his best finish in the first three meetings was a fifteenth-place finish at Hockenheim. This series of results cost him his place on the Red Bull Junior Team. Dillmann returned to the series later in the season at the Nürburgring, with the Jo Zeller Racing team, after they parted with Michael Klein. He qualified third for the Saturday race and finished the race in the same position, before taking a fifth place in the Sunday race. Dillmann did not continue with the team beyond that meeting, and was classified 18th in the final drivers' championship standings. Instead, Dillmann ended the season in the Italian Formula Three Championship with the Europa Corse team. In three meetings, Dillmann recorded two second places and two third places, and ended the season in seventh place in the championship.

Despite this, Dillmann started the 2009 season without a drive. After sitting on the sidelines in the first half of the year, Dillmann replaced Kevin Mirocha at HBR Motorsport in the Euro Series; ahead of the Oschersleben meeting of the championship. He finished outside the top-20 in both races, but remained with the team for the following event at the Nürburgring, where he recorded a best result of fourteenth place. Dillmann also contested the final two meetings of the season; he competed at Dijon with Prema Powerteam, and again with HBR Motorsport, at Hockenheim. Aside from his Euro Series commitments, Dillmann raced in the final three meetings of the German Formula Three Championship with Neuhauser Racing; joining the series at the Nürburgring. Dillmann was on the pace immediately, taking pole position for the second race of the weekend; he finished both races on the podium, with a third place and a victory in the second race. Dillmann also won races at the Sachsenring and Oschersleben, to finish sixth in the drivers' championship, having competed in just six races.

Dillmann competed full-time in German Formula Three in the 2010 Formel 3 season, moving to the HS Technik team. At the first meeting of the year at Oschersleben, Dillmann won the second race on-the-road, before being demoted to seventh after a post-race penalty for jumping the start. Dillmann's first two victories of the season came at the following meeting, at the Sachsenring. Dillmann won both races during the weekend, to move into the championship lead. Dillmann extended his championship lead after a third victory of the season, from pole position, at Hockenheim. A strong weekend for Van Amersfoort Racing's Daniel Abt at Assen moved him ahead of Dillmann in the championship, but Dillmann took the championship lead once again after a double win at the Nürburgring. Consistent points finishes were the key to Dillmann's second half of the campaign, going on a run of five races without a podium, but his championship lead was slightly reduced by Abt. Dillmann achieved another victory at the Nürburgring during the championship's second visit to the circuit, and held a nine-point championship lead over Abt into the final meeting of the season at Oschersleben. Dillmann finished second to Abt in the opening race at Oschersleben, to reduce the advantage to seven points; but Dillmann ultimately prevailed, as Abt failed to score points in the final race due to a broken lambda sensor. Dillmann, who had earlier retired with a fuel pump failure, became the first French driver to win the championship title. He was invited to a Formula Renault 3.5 Series test at Motorland Aragón in October 2010, as a result of becoming champion in German Formula Three. Dillmann set the third-quickest time during the test, and best of all newcomers, while driving for the ISR Racing team.

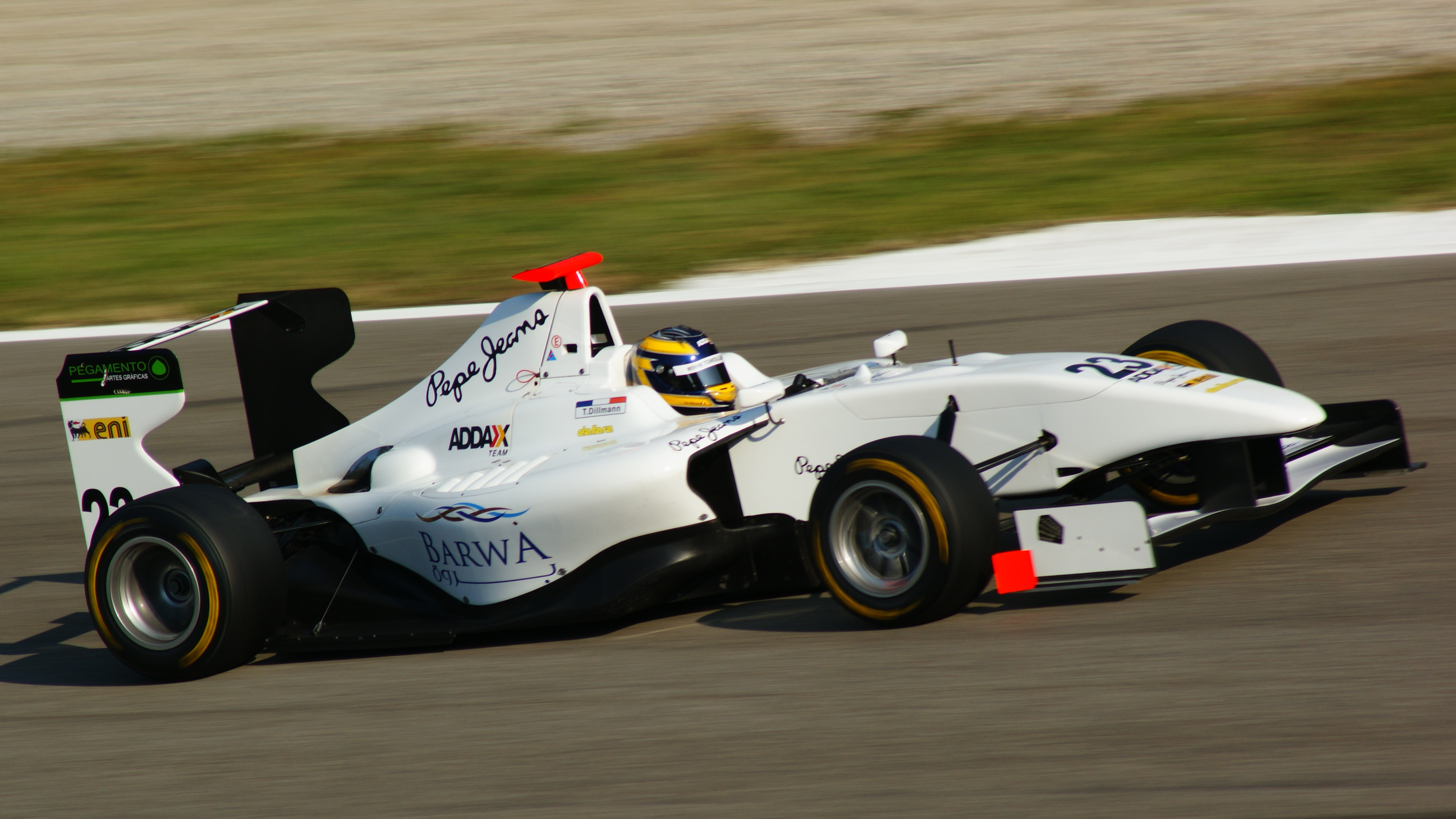
Dillmann driving at Monza during the 2011 GP3 Series finale.

Dillmann also contested three events in the Italian Formula Three Championship; at the opening meeting at Misano, Dillmann took a fourth place and a second place for Scuderia Victoria. He returned for the final two meetings with EuroInternational, failing to score a point. He finished the championship thirteenth overall. Dillmann contested two meetings of the Formula 3 Euro Series in 2011; he competed for Carlin at Hockenheim, and Motopark at the Red Bull Ring, achieving a best result of third place in the third race at the Red Bull Ring, taking his first Euro Series podium since 2008. Dillmann also contested the Zolder round of the German Formula Three Championship, competing in the Trophy class for older-specification machinery. Dillmann won one race, and finished third in the other.

==== GP3 Series (2011) ====
In March 2011, Dillmann joined the Carlin team for the 2011 season, partnering Conor Daly and Leonardo Cordeiro in the team. At the opening round of the season in Istanbul, Dillmann qualified on pole position for the first race, recording two laps good enough for the top spot. Dillmann made a poor start to the race, but eventually finished the race in third position. Following the event however, Dillmann was dropped by the team; at the mid-season test at the Hungaroring, Dillmann joined the Addax Team, and remained with the team into the third round of the season, in Valencia. Dillmann finished in the points at three successive meetings – at the Nürburgring, the Hungaroring and Spa-Francorchamps – and finished the season in fourteenth place in the drivers' championship.

==== GP2 Series (2012–2014) ====
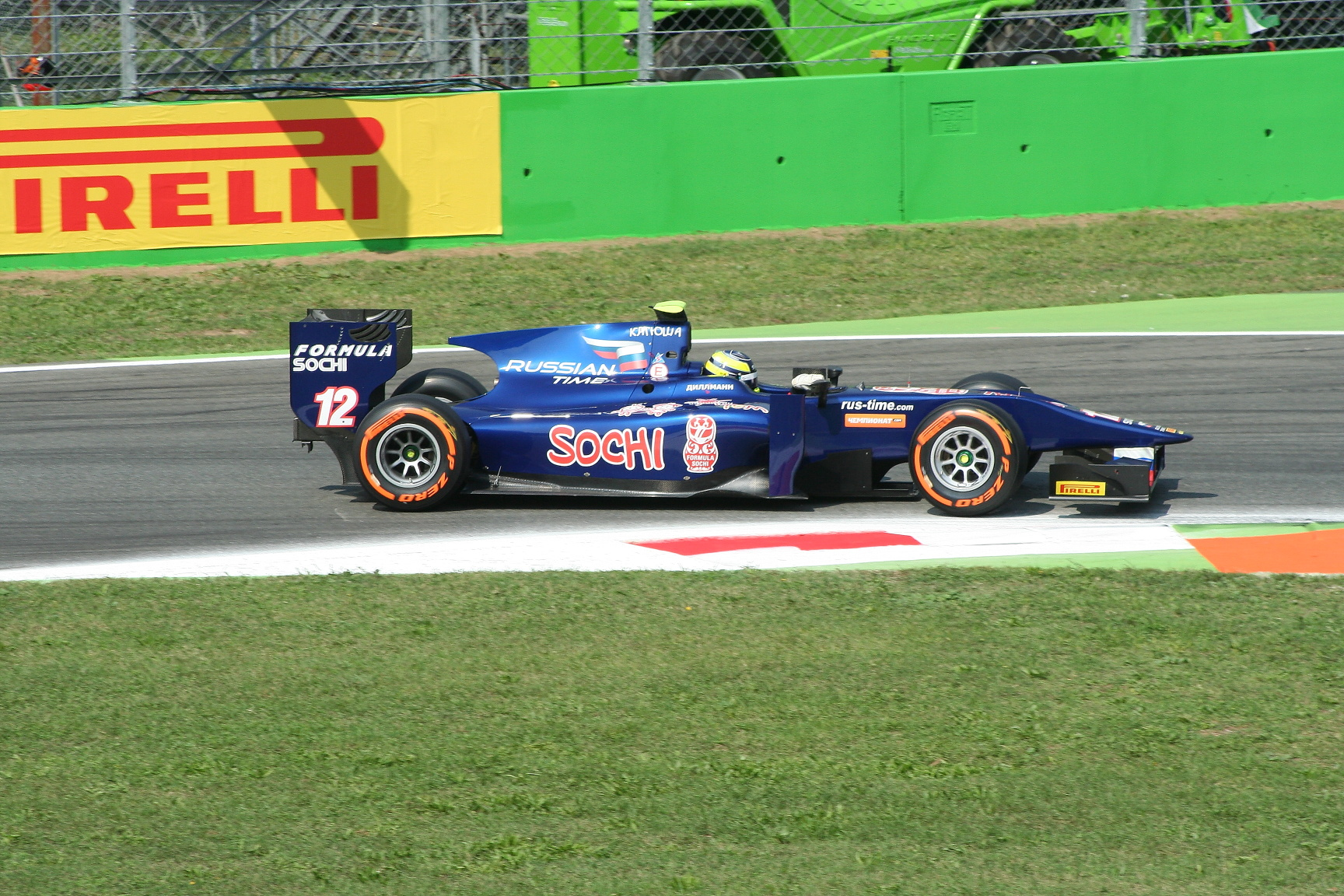
Dillmann took third place during the feature race of the 2013 GP2 Series round at Monza.

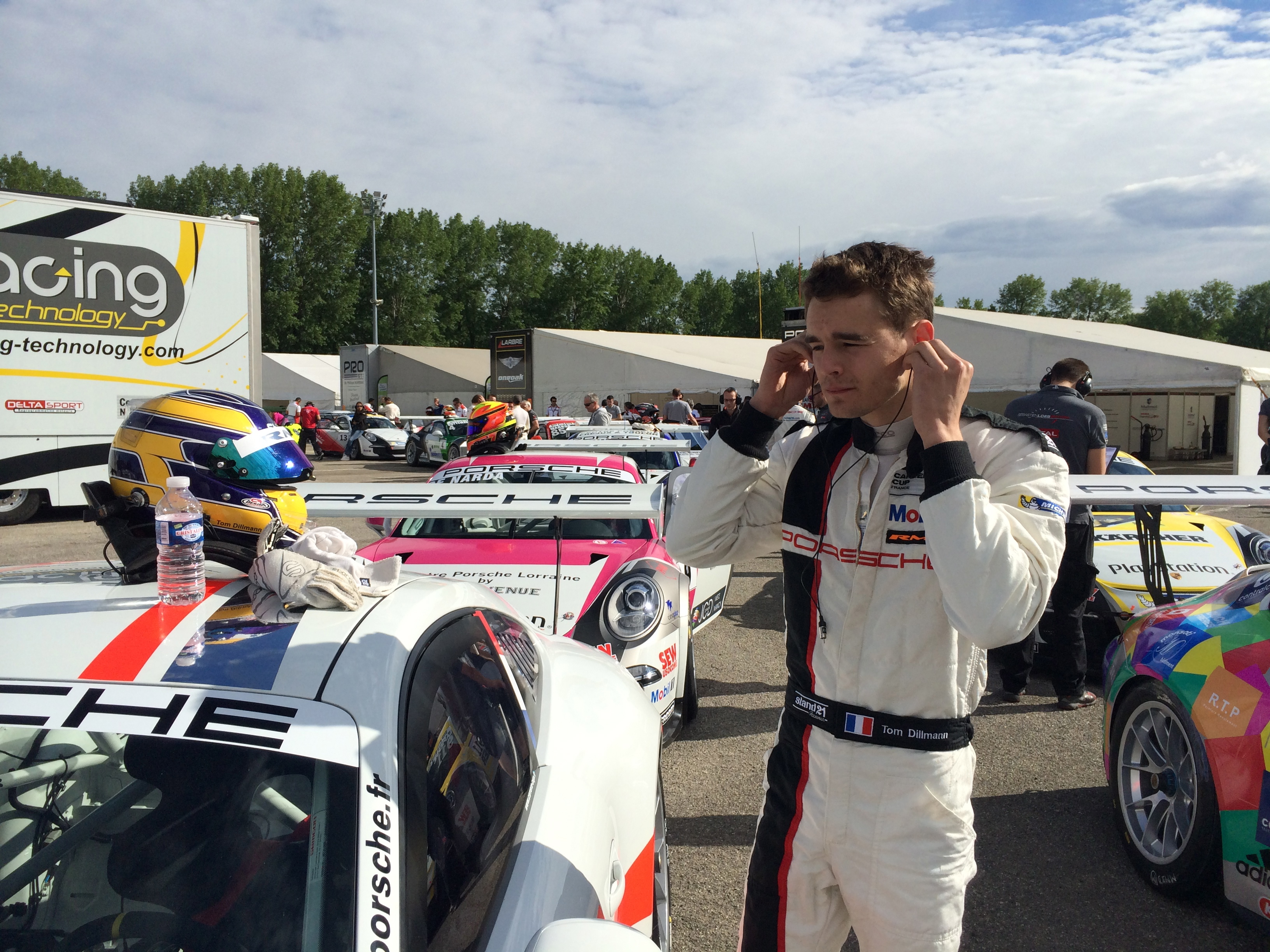
Dillmann preparing for a Porsche Carrera Cup France race at Imola. He won the second race of the weekend.

Following the end of the 2011 GP3 season, Dillmann tested a GP2 car for the iSport International team, during the post-season tests at Jerez and Barcelona. His testing performances enabled him to join the team for the non-championship GP2 Final event held at the Yas Marina Circuit, in support of the Abu Dhabi Grand Prix. He finished both races in the points, as he finished in sixth place in the first race before a third place in the second race. His results were the second-best by a GP3 graduate, after James Calado, and earned Dillmann €10,000 from series tyre manufacturer Pirelli.

After testing for Ocean Racing Technology and the Rapax Team during the preseason tests, Dillmann joined Rapax ahead of the 2012 season-opening event at Sepang. He took his first GP2 win in the sprint race of the third round of the championship, held in Bahrain. After failing to score in the following six races, he lost his seat for the round at Silverstone to Daniël de Jong, who had previously taken the seat of his teammate, Ricardo Teixeira. He returned to racing action for the next round at Hockenheim, however, as De Jong was competing in a clashing Auto GP World Series event in Brazil, but then lost it again for the following round in Hungary due to budgetary problems. He ended the season 15th in the standings; the highest-placed driver not to complete the full season.

For 2013, it was announced that Dillmann would join the new Motopark-run Russian Time team alongside GP2 returnee Sam Bird. He scored two pole positions and fastest laps apiece and finished tenth overall, eight places behind Bird.

In 2014, although confirmed at Russian Time, the death of the team principal in January had the consequence that he lost his seat; Dillmann contested eight rounds of the championship with Arden International and Caterham, finishing on the podium in the sprint race at Catalunya and achieving the fastest lap in the feature race at the Hungaroring.

==== Formula 3.5 (2015–2016) ====
In 2015, Dillmann joined the series with Jagonya Ayam with Carlin. He achieved a pole position in the final round at Jerez and finished seventh overall, despite scoring no victories. The following season, Dillmann switched to AVF. Taking two race wins, five pole positions and two fastest laps, Dillmann secured the championship at the final round, seven points ahead of nearest challenger Louis Delétraz.

=== Formula E (2015–) ===
In August 2015, Dillmann partook in pre-season testing with Team Aguri along with fellow former GP2 racer Stefano Coletti.

In April 2017, Dillmann partook in the free practice session with Venturi at the Mexico City ePrix in place of Stéphane Sarrazin. Later that month, Venturi announced Dillmann would make his racing debut at the Paris ePrix in place of Maro Engel.

For the 2018–19 FE season, Dillmann joined Nio on a full-time basis. He failed to score points throughout the season, finishing 23rd in the standings.

In May 2021, Dillmann was announced as the simulator and reserve driver for the Jaguar Racing Formula E team. He remains in that role ever since.

=== Sportscar career (2015–) ===
==== World Endurance Championship (2015–2016, 2018–2020, 2023, 2027–) ====
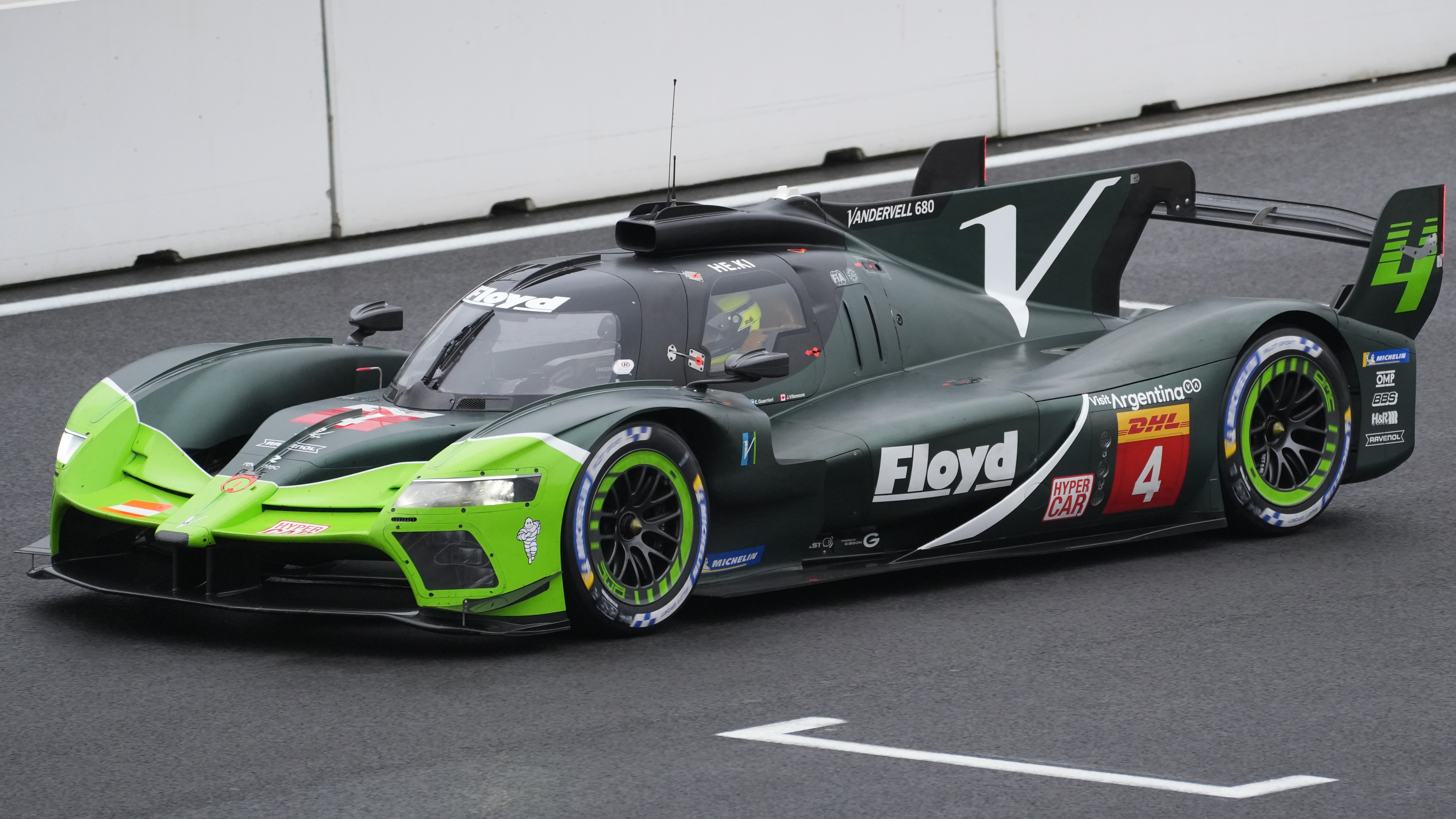
Dillmann driving at the 2023 6 Hours of Spa-Francorchamps.

Dillman began his career in the World Endurance Championship in 2015, joining Signatech Alpine for two races starting from the 2015 6 Hours of Shanghai; he won his first ever race in the series. After a single race campaign with Extreme Speed Motorsports in 2016, Dillmann joined ByKolles Racing in 2018 for their LMP1 efforts in the World Endurance Championship. Dillmann took part in total of eight races out of sixteen that 2018-2019 and 2019-20 WEC seasons consisted of, scoring the best result of fourth and not finishing half of them. The car that Dillmann was provided with was known for its lack of reliability and performance.

On 11 January 2023, it was revealed that Dillmann would contest the full 2023 FIA World Endurance Championship for the rebranded byKolles team, called now Vanwall Racing Team, in the Le Mans Hypercar class, driving alongside Esteban Guerrieri and 1997 Formula One World Champion Jacques Villeneuve. Despite building a new car, team's result haven't improved. Dillmann departed the team on 16 June 2023; he cited a desire to find a seat elsewhere and "to try something else" and that his departure was on "good terms", along with paying tribute to team principal Colin Kolles in a statement. He was replaced by two-time Super GT champion João Paulo de Oliveira.

Dillmann will return to the World Endurance Championship in 2027 as a reserve driver for the Ford Racing team in the Hypercar class.

==== 24 Hours of Le Mans (2018–2020, 2023, 2025–) ====
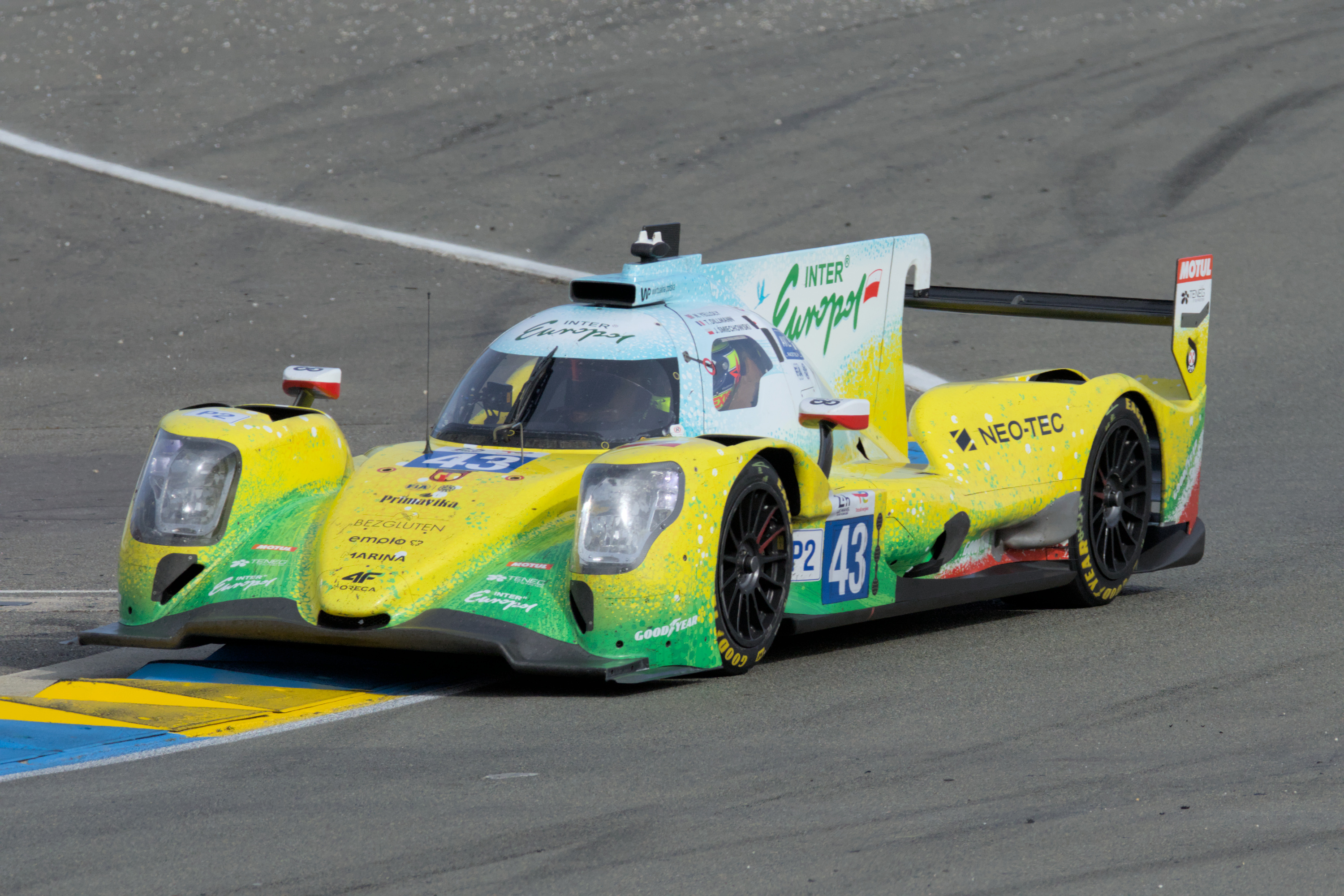
Dillmann won the 2025 and 2026 editions of the 24 Hours of Le Mans in the LMP2 class, driving for Inter Europol Competition

In his first four attempts in the 24 Hours of Le Mans in the years of 2018, 2019, 2020 and 2023, Dillmann didn't finish the race a single time - result of teammate's crashing, engine and gearbox issues, rear wing falling off the car and engine breaking down, respectively.

In 2025, Dillmann made his return to the Circuit de la Sarthe, driving for Inter Europol Competition in LMP2 class. Dillmann and his teammates Jakub Śmiechowski and Nick Yelloly have won the French classic. The number 43 car led the race from the morning, maintaining a lead of no more than twenty seconds over the number 48 car of the VDS Panis Racing team. The last hour of the race had a dramatic twist; 34 minutes before the finish, the team was given a drive-through penalty as a result of Yelloly's speeding in the pit lane during the previous stop. Subsequently, lost lead was regained after another few minutes due to a suspension failure in the rivals' car. The team finished the race with a lead of nearly two minutes over Panis team.

Dillmann won the 2022 Le Mans Cup alongside Alexander Mattschull. It was his first full season of racing since 2019.

Dillmann successfully defended his 2025 victory in the 2026 edition of the race, again with Inter Europol Competition and same teammates, finishing ahead of the sister car of the team. Frenchman's performance was crucial for the final result; he was the fastest driver of the crew and spent more than 10 hours in the car. Dillmann, Śmiechowski and Yelloly utilized a slightly different tyre strategy than a sister car, which was in part due to both cars running close to each other in the last hours of the race, as well as saved fuel for most of the race.

==== Le Mans Cup (2021–2022) ====
Dillmann made a single start in the 2021 season of the Michelin Le Mans Cup, finishing 10th while driving for Mühlner Motorsport at the Circuit de Catalunya. For the year of 2022, Dillmann joined the Le Mans Cup for the full season, having signed the contract with Racing Spirit of Léman. Dillmann and his teammate Alexander Mattschull won three races of the season and claimed the championship of the series.

==== IMSA Sportscar Championship (2024–) ====
At the beginning of the year of 2024, Dillmann made a decision to step back from the Vanwall Hypercar project into the LMP2 class of the endurance racing, having signed a contract with Inter Europol Competition, driving in the IMSA SportsCar Championship alongside Nick Boulle and Jakub Śmiechowski. He made his debut for the Polish team at the 24 Hours of Daytona. Dillmann's American outings brought him IMSA LMP2 champion title in the debut year. Victory at Canadian Tire Motorsport Park, podiums at Watkins Glen and Indianapolis and overall consistent performance from Inter Europol by PR1/Mathiasen, with seventh at Road America being the worst result of the season brought the Frenchman the champions’ crown.

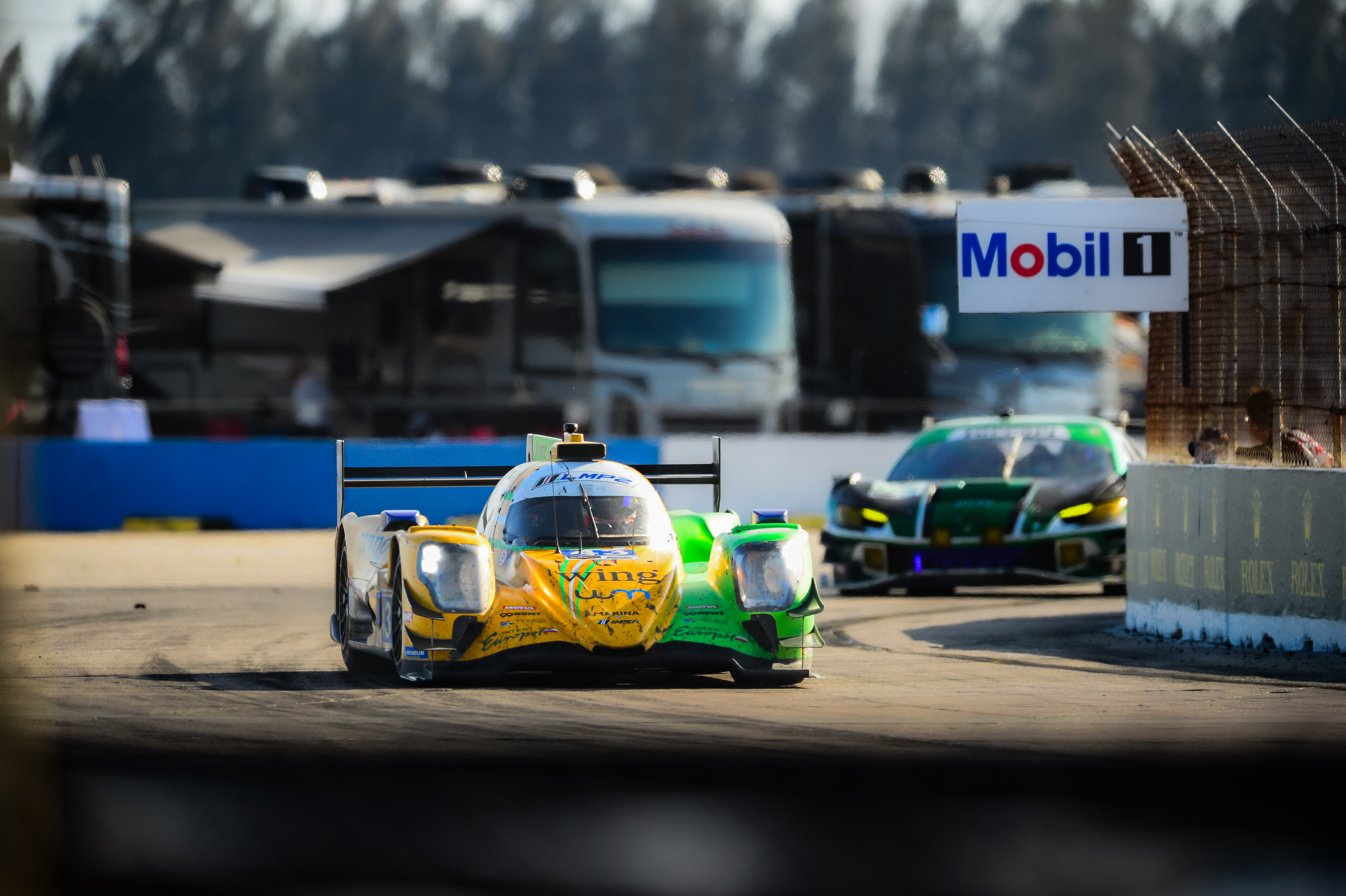
Dillmann took the victory in the 2025 12 Hours of Sebring

In 2025, Inter Europol Competition finished its first independent season in the IMSA Sportscar Championship in third place overall, achieved after winning the 12 Hours of Sebring in the final minutes of the race, three second places, and low finishes in the remaining three races due to technical problems - thanks to efforts of Dillmann and his new partners, Jeremy Clarke and Bijoy Garg. Dillmann, however, finished 11th in the Drivers' Championship. A suspension failure late in the race at Canadian Tire Motorsport Park, while Dillmann was leading the race, resulted in a serious accident, causing him to undergo surgery on his injured spine and miss the race at Road America.

In the season of 2026, Dillmann again competed in the IMSA series with Inter Europol with Clarke and Garg as his teammates. The year started with a second place in the 24 Hours of Daytona. Dillmann ended the season of 2026 as series runner-up, missing the championship title by less than a second, following a year-long battle with the Crowdstrike by APR team.

Dillmann will return to series for the 2027 season, with the same team and codrivers as in two previous seasons.

==== European Le Mans Series (2024–) ====
The last part of Dillmann's ongoing LMP2 program with Inter Europol Competition was the European Le Mans Series. In the 2024 season, at the Circuit Paul Ricard Dillmann achieved his first win in the series, after a dramatic race and inheriting the win just before the finish. This victory turned out to be the only one of the season, but just as in IMSA consistency (seventh similarly being worst result) was the deciding factor on the way to second position in overall classification for Dillmann, who was the informal captain of the No. 43 car, as well as Vladislav Lomko and Sebastián Álvarez. The crew finished the final race of the season in Portimao in fourth place, after confusion over serving a later revoked penalty, which Dillmann publicly expressed his discontent about.

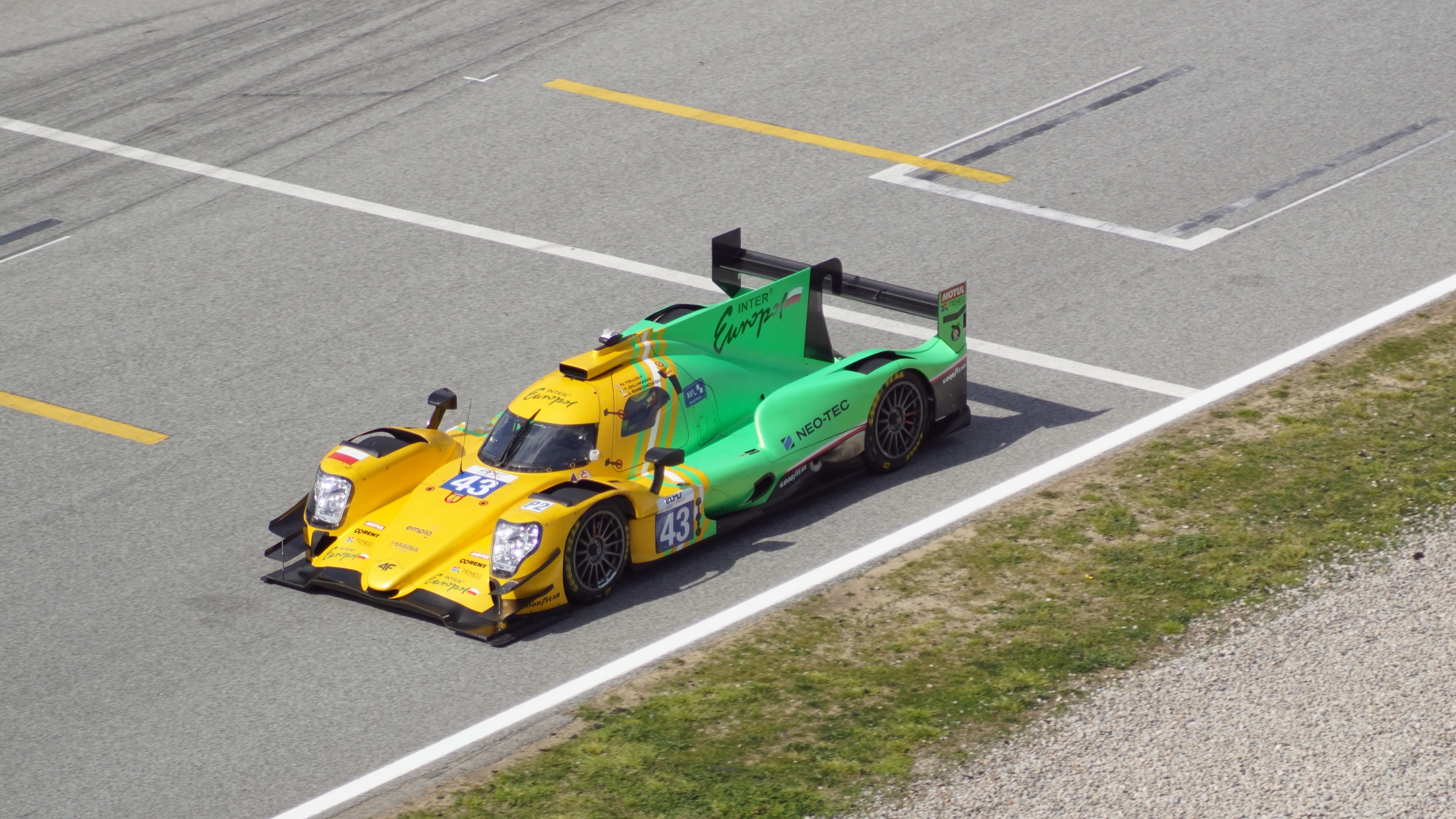
Five second-place finishes in the 2025 ELMS season resulted in second place in the overall standings

The 2025 storyline of the battle with VDS Panis Racing continued throughout the year in the ELMS, where it ended with a victory for the French team. Five second places in a total of six races earned Dillmann, Śmiechowski and Yelloly second place in the overall series standings. Dillmann's performance throughout the season was notable; he was presented with the Goodyear Golden Wingfoot Award, handed by the series organizers for the fastest driver of the series, chosen by taking an average stint time over the course of the entire 2025 season.

In the season of 2026, Dillmann once again competed in the ELMS alongside Śmiechowski and Yelloly in the #43 entry. He won a single race at Spa-Francorchamps and finished 5th in the overall standings.

==== Asian Le Mans Series (2024–2026) ====
Since the 2023–24 season, Dillmann raced in the Asian Le Mans Series in the LMP2 class. In his debut season, Dillmann, alongside Laurents Hörr and Alexander Mattschull finished fifth in the overall standings, having driven for DKR Engineering.

For the season of 2024–25, Dillmann, like in the European Le Mans Series, found himself driving a car alongside Vladislav Lomko, as well as Giorgio Roda, for Proton Competition, again finishing fifth overall, scoring a single podium result.

In the 2025–26 season, Dillmann, driving for Algarve Pro Racing with Enzo Trulli and Michael Jensen achieved his best result to date, scoring three second places and third position overall.

== Personal life ==
Dillmann is married to a Brazilian model Nicolle Taketa Schneider since 2018. Together they have a daughter, born in 2021.

== Racing record ==
=== Career summary ===
Season	Series	Team	Races	Wins	Poles	F/Laps	Podiums	Points	Position
2004	Formula Renault 1.6 Belgium	Tom Team	14	1	0	2	2	147	5th
2004	Formula Renault Monza	Tom Team	4	0	0	0	0	28	14th
2004	Formula Junior 1600 Spain	Tom Team	2	0	0	0	1	0	NC†
2005	Eurocup Formula Renault 2.0	Prema Powerteam	6	0	0	0	0	0	37th
2005	Eurocup Formula Renault 2.0	Cram Competition	4	0	0	0	0	0	37th
2005	French Formula Renault 2.0	MC Racing	5	0	0	0	0	0	30th
2006	Eurocup Formula Renault 2.0	SG Formula	14	0	0	2	3	61	8th
2006	French Formula Renault 2.0	SG Formula	9	2	1	2	2	34	10th
2007	Formula 3 Euro Series	ASM Formule 3	18	0	0	0	3	23	9th
2007	Masters of Formula 3	ASM Formule 3	1	0	0	0	0	N/A	NC
2008	Formula 3 Euro Series	SG Formula	6	0	0	0	0	8	18th
2008	Formula 3 Euro Series	Jo Zeller Racing	2	0	0	0	1	8	18th
2008	Masters of Formula 3	Jo Zeller Racing	1	0	0	0	0	N/A	16th
2008	Italian Formula 3 Championship	Europa Corse	6	0	0	1	4	29	7th
2009	Formula 3 Euro Series	HBR Motorsport	6	0	0	0	0	0	30th
2009	Formula 3 Euro Series	Prema Powerteam	2	0	0	0	0	0	30th
2009	German Formula 3 Championship	Neuhauser Racing	6	3	3	2	5	49	6th
2010	German Formula 3 Championship	HS Technik	18	6	7	10	9	120	**1st**
2010	Italian Formula 3 Championship	Scuderia Victoria World	2	0	0	1	1	22	13th
2010	Italian Formula 3 Championship	EuroInternational	4	0	0	0	0	22	13th
2011	GP3 Series	Carlin	2	0	1	0	1	15	14th
2011	GP3 Series	Addax Team	12	0	0	0	0	15	14th
2011	Formula 3 Euro Series	Motopark	3	0	0	0	0	0	NC†
2011	Formula 3 Euro Series	Carlin	3	0	0	0	1	0	NC†
2011	FIA Formula 3 International Trophy	Carlin	2	0	0	0	0	0	NC†
2011	FIA Formula 3 International Trophy	Motopark	1	0	0	0	0	0	NC†
2011	GP2 Final	iSport International	2	0	0	0	1	7	6th
2011	German Formula 3 Championship	STROMOS Artline	2	0	0	0	0	0	NC
2011	German Formula 3 Trophy	STROMOS Artline	2	1	2	2	2	16	5th
2012	GP2 Series	Rapax	14	1	0	0	1	29	15th
2013	GP2 Series	Russian Time	22	0	1	2	2	92	10th
2014	Porsche Carrera Cup France	RMS	12	3	2	4	7	144	**3rd**
2014	GP2 Series	Arden International	2	0	0	0	1	18	19th
2014	GP2 Series	EQ8 Caterham Racing	6	0	0	1	0	18	19th
2014	Porsche Carrera Cup Germany	Team 75 Bernhard	3	0	0	0	0	0	NC†
2014	Porsche Supercup	Lechner Racing Team	1	0	0	0	0	0	NC†
2015	Formula Renault 3.5 Series	Jagonya Ayam with Carlin	17	0	1	1	2	122	7th
2015	FIA World Endurance Championship - LMP2	Signatech Alpine	2	1	1	0	1	38	13th
2015	ADAC GT Masters	Bentley Team HTP	4	0	1	0	0	17	30th
2015	Blancpain Sprint Series	Bentley Team HTP	2	0	0	0	0	8	23rd
2015	Blancpain Sprint Series - Silver	Bentley Team HTP	2	2	1	2	2	34	6th
2015–16	Formula E	Team Aguri	Test driver						
2016	Formula V8 3.5 Series	AVF	18	2	5	2	10	237	**1st**
2016	FIA World Endurance Championship - LMP2	Extreme Speed Motorsports	1	0	0	0	0	10	27th
2016–17	Formula E	Venturi Grand Prix	7	0	0	0	0	12	19th
2017	Blancpain GT Series Sprint Cup	GRT Grasser Racing Team	2	0	0	0	0	0	NC
2017	Blancpain GT Series Endurance Cup	GRT Grasser Racing Team	1	0	0	0	0	0	NC
2017–18	Formula E	Venturi Formula E Team	3	0	0	0	0	12	18th
2018	Super Formula	UOMO Sunoco Team LeMans	5	0	0	0	0	5	14th
2018	24 Hours of Le Mans - LMP1	ByKolles Racing Team	1	0	0	0	0	N/A	DNF
2018–19	Formula E	Nio Formula E Team	13	0	0	1	0	0	23rd
2018–19	FIA World Endurance Championship - LMP1	ByKolles Racing Team	6	0	0	0	0	22.5	17th
2019	24H Series - 991	Team Webheads							
2019	24 Hours of Le Mans - LMP1	ByKolles Racing Team	1	0	0	0	0	N/A	DNF
2019–20	FIA World Endurance Championship - LMP1	ByKolles Racing Team	2	0	0	0	0	0	NC†
2020	24H GT Series - GTX	Leipert Motorsport							
2020–21	Formula E	Jaguar Racing	Reserve driver						
2021	Le Mans Cup - LMP3	Mühlner Motorsport	1	0	0	0	0	1	36th
2021–22	Formula E	Jaguar TCS Racing	Reserve driver						
2022	Le Mans Cup - LMP3	Racing Spirit of Léman	7	3	1	3	5	97	**1st**
2022–23	Formula E	Jaguar TCS Racing	Reserve driver						
2023	FIA World Endurance Championship - Hypercar	Floyd Vanwall Racing Team	4	0	0	0	0	6	17th
2023	24 Hours of Le Mans - Hypercar	Floyd Vanwall Racing Team	1	0	0	0	0	N/A	DNF
2023–24	Asian Le Mans Series - LMP2	DKR Engineering	5	0	0	1	2	62	5th
2023–24	Formula E	Jaguar TCS Racing	Reserve driver						
2024	European Le Mans Series - LMP2	Inter Europol Competition	6	1	0	0	2	81	**2nd**
2024	IMSA SportsCar Championship - LMP2	Inter Europol by PR1/Mathiasen Motorsports	7	1	1	1	3	2227	**1st**
2024–25	Asian Le Mans Series - LMP2	Proton Competition	6	0	0	0	1	63	5th
2024–25	Formula E	Jaguar TCS Racing	Reserve driver						
2025	IMSA SportsCar Championship - LMP2	Inter Europol Competition	6	1	1	0	3	1798	11th
2025	European Le Mans Series - LMP2	Inter Europol Competition	6	0	1	0	5	92	**2nd**
2025	24 Hours of Le Mans - LMP2	Inter Europol Competition	1	1	0	0	1	N/A	**1st**
2025	Nürburgring Langstrecken-Serie - BMW M240i	PTerting Sports by Up2Race							
2025–26	Asian Le Mans Series - LMP2	Algarve Pro Racing	6	0	0	1	3	74	**3rd**
2025–26	Formula E	Jaguar TCS Racing	Reserve driver						
2026	IMSA SportsCar Championship - LMP2	Inter Europol Competition	7	2	4	2	4	2302	**2nd**
2026	European Le Mans Series - LMP2	Inter Europol Competition	6	1	1	1	2	59	5th
2026	24 Hours of Le Mans - LMP2	Inter Europol Competition	1	1	0	0	1	N/A	**1st**
2027	FIA World Endurance Championship - Hypercar	Ford Racing	Reserve driver						

^{†} As Dillmann was a guest driver he was ineligible to score points. ^{*} Season still in progress.

=== Complete Eurocup Formula Renault 2.0 results ===
(key) (Races in bold indicate pole position; races in italics indicate fastest lap)

Year	Entrant	1	2	3	4	5	6	7	8	9	10	11	12	13	14	DC	Points
2005	Prema Powerteam	ZOL; 1 Ret	ZOL; 2; 28	VAL; 1; 26	VAL; 2; 23	LMS; 1; 13	LMS; 2; 19									37th	0
2005	Cram Competition							BIL; 1; 16	BIL; 2 Ret	OSC; 1 Ret	OSC; 2; 21					37th	0
2006	SG Formula	ZOL; 1; 24	ZOL; 2; 4	IST; 1; 9	IST; 2; 27	MIS; 1; 2	MIS; 2; 7	NÜR; 1; 11	NÜR; 2; 34	DON; 1; 4	DON; 2 Ret	LMS; 1 Ret	LMS; 2 NC	CAT; 1; 2	CAT; 2; 2	8th	61

=== Complete Formula 3 Euro Series results ===
Year	Entrant	Chassis	Engine	1	2	3	4	5	6	7	8	9	10	11	12	13	14	15	16	17	18	19	20	21	22	23	24	25	26	27	DC	Points
2007	ASM Formule 3	Dallara F307/012	Mercedes	HOC; 1 DNS	HOC; 2 DNS	BRH; 1; 10	BRH; 2; 9	NOR; 1; 4	NOR; 2; 3	MAG; 1; 9	MAG; 2 Ret	MUG; 1 Ret	MUG; 2; 8	ZAN; 1; 18	ZAN; 2; 4	NÜR; 1; 13	NÜR; 2 Ret	CAT; 1; 3	CAT; 2; 2	NOG; 1 Ret	NOG; 2; 19	HOC; 1; 17	HOC; 2; 14								8th	37
2008	SG Formula	Dallara F308/014	Mercedes	HOC; 1 Ret	HOC; 2; 15	MUG; 1; 16	MUG; 2; 27	PAU; 1 Ret	PAU; 2; 25	NOR; 1	NOR; 2	ZAN; 1	ZAN; 2																		18th	8
2008	Jo Zeller Racing	Dallara F308/044	Mercedes											NÜR; 1; 3	NÜR; 2; 5	BRH; 1	BRH; 2	CAT; 1	CAT; 2	LMS; 1	LMS; 2	HOC; 1	HOC; 2								18th	8
2009	HBR Motorsport	Dallara F308/021	Mercedes	HOC; 1	HOC; 2	LAU; 1	LAU; 2	NOR; 1	NOR; 2	ZAN; 1	ZAN; 2	OSC; 1; 25	OSC; 2; 22	NÜR; 1; 22	NÜR; 2; 14	BRH; 1	BRH; 2	CAT; 1	CAT; 2			HOC; 1; 15	HOC; 2 Ret								30th	0
2009	Prema Powerteam	Dallara F308/015	Mercedes																	DIJ; 1; 19	DIJ; 2 Ret										30th	0
2011	Motopark Academy	Dallara F308/006	Volkswagen	LEC; 1	LEC; 2	LEC; 3	HOC; 1; 12	HOC; 2; 10	HOC; 3; 8	ZAN; 1	ZAN; 2	ZAN; 3																			NC†	0
2011	Carlin	Dallara F308/056	Volkswagen										RBR; 1; 4	RBR; 2; 12	RBR; 3; 3	NOR; 1	NOR; 2	NOR; 3	NÜR; 1	NÜR; 2	NÜR; 3	SIL; 1	SIL; 2	SIL; 3	VAL; 1	VAL; 2	VAL; 3	HOC; 1	HOC; 2	HOC; 3	NC†	0

^{†} As Dillmann was a guest driver, he was ineligible to score points.

=== Complete GP3 Series results ===
(key) (Races in bold indicate pole position)

Year	Entrant	1	2	3	4	5	6	7	8	9	10	11	12	13	14	15	16	DC	Points
2011	Carlin	**IST**; **FEA**; 3	IST; SPR; 9	CAT; FEA	CAT; SPR													14th	15
2011	Addax Team					VAL; FEA; 20	VAL; SPR; Ret	SIL; FEA; Ret	SIL; SPR; 25†	NÜR; FEA; 22	NÜR; SPR; 5	HUN; FEA; 7	HUN; SPR; 22	SPA; FEA; 6	SPA; SPR; Ret	MNZ; FEA; Ret	MNZ; SPR; 9	14th	15

^{†} Did not finish, but was classified as he had completed more than 90% of the race distance.

=== Complete GP2 Series results ===
(key) (Races in bold indicate pole position) (Races in italics indicate fastest lap)

Year	Entrant	1	2	3	4	5	6	7	8	9	10	11	12	13	14	15	16	17	18	19	20	21	22	23	24	DC	Points
2012	Rapax	SEP; FEA; 18	SEP; SPR; 11	BHR1; FEA; 6	BHR1; SPR; 10	BHR2; FEA; 8	BHR2; SPR; 1	CAT; FEA; 22	CAT; SPR; 12	MON; FEA; 11	MON; SPR; Ret	VAL; FEA; Ret	VAL; SPR; 12	SIL; FEA	SIL; SPR	HOC; FEA; 9	HOC; SPR; Ret	HUN; FEA	HUN; SPR	SPA; FEA	SPA; SPR	MNZ; FEA	MNZ; SPR	MRN; FEA	MRN; SPR	15th	29
2013	Russian Time	SEP; FEA; 14	SEP; SPR; 11	BHR; FEA; 8	BHR; SPR; 4	CAT; FEA; 5	CAT; SPR; 26	MON; FEA; 11	MON; SPR; 25	SIL; FEA; 3	SIL; SPR; 6	NÜR; FEA; 8	NÜR; SPR; Ret	**HUN**; **FEA**; 20	HUN; SPR; 11	SPA; FEA; 5	SPA; SPR; 9	MNZ; FEA; 3	MNZ; SPR; 5	MRN; FEA; 6	MRN; SPR; 14	YMC; FEA; Ret	YMC; SPR; DNS			10th	92
2014	Arden International	BHR; FEA	BHR; SPR	CAT; FEA; 8	CAT; SPR; 3	MON; FEA	MON; SPR	RBR; FEA	RBR; SPR	SIL; FEA	SIL; SPR															19th	18
2014	EQ8 Caterham Racing											HOC; FEA; 12	HOC; SPR; 9	HUN; FEA; 9	HUN; SPR; 19†	SPA; FEA; 12	SPA; SPR; 9	MNZ; FEA	MNZ; SPR	SOC; FEA	SOC; SPR	YMC; FEA	YMC; SPR			19th	18

^{†} Driver did not finish the race, but was classified as he completed over 90% of the race distance.

==== Complete GP2 Final results ====
(key) (Races in bold indicate pole position) (Races in italics indicate fastest lap)

Year	Entrant	1	2	DC	Points
2011	iSport International	YMC; FEA; 6	YMC; SPR; 3	6th	7

=== Complete Formula V8 3.5 Series results ===
(key) (Races in bold indicate pole position) (Races in italics indicate fastest lap)

Year	Team	1	2	3	4	5	6	7	8	9	10	11	12	13	14	15	16	17	18	Pos.	Points
2015	Jagonya Ayam with Carlin	ALC; 1; 9	ALC; 2; 5	MON; 1; 3	SPA; 1; 6	SPA; 2; 16	HUN; 1; 5	HUN; 2; 5	RBR; 1; 5	RBR; 2; 8	SIL; 1; 5	SIL; 2 Ret	NÜR; 1; 5	NÜR; 2; 14	BUG; 1; 3	BUG; 2; 5	**JER**; **1** Ret	JER; 2; 6		7th	122
2016	AVF	ALC; 1; 3	**ALC**; **2**; 2	**HUN**; **1**; 2	**HUN**; **2**; 1	SPA; 1; 2	**SPA**; **2**; 2	LEC; 1; 4	LEC; 2; 6	SIL; 1; 4	SIL; 2; 4	RBR; 1; 3	RBR; 2; 2	MNZ; 1; 12	MNZ; 2; 8	JER; 1 Ret	JER; 2; 8	**CAT**; **1**; 3	CAT; 2; 1	1st	237

=== Complete FIA World Endurance Championship results ===
(key) (Races in bold indicate pole position; races in italics indicate fastest lap)

Year	Entrant	Class	Chassis	Engine	1	2	3	4	5	6	7	8	9	Rank	Points
2015	Signatech Alpine	LMP2	Alpine A450b	Nissan VK45DE 4.5 L V8	SIL	SPA	LMS	NÜR	COA	FUJ	SHA; 1	**BHR**; 4		13th	38
2016	Extreme Speed Motorsports	LMP2	Ligier JS P2	Nissan VK45DE 4.5 L V8	SIL	SPA	LMS	NÜR	MEX	COA	FUJ	SHA	BHR; 5	27th	10
2018–19	ByKolles Racing Team	LMP1	ENSO CLM P1/01	Nismo VRX30A 3.0 L Turbo V6	SPA; 4	LMS; Ret	SIL	FUJ; 5	SHA; Ret	SEB				17th	22.5
2018–19	ByKolles Racing Team	LMP1	ENSO CLM P1/01	Gibson GL458 4.5 L V8							SPA; 14	LMS; Ret		17th	22.5
2019–20	ByKolles Racing Team	LMP1	ENSO CLM P1/01	Gibson GL458 4.5 L V8	SIL	FUJ	SHA	BHR	COA	SPA; 11	LMS; Ret	BHR		NC†	0†
2023	Floyd Vanwall Racing Team	Hypercar	Vanwall Vandervell 680	Gibson GL458 4.5 L V8	SEB; 8	ALG; Ret	SPA; Ret	LMS; Ret	MNZ	FUJ	BHR			17th	6

^{†} As Dillmann was a guest driver he was ineligible to score points.

=== Complete Blancpain GT Series Sprint Cup results ===
(key) (Races in bold indicate pole position; races in italics indicate fastest lap)

Year	Team	Car	Class	1	2	3	4	5	6	7	8	9	10	11	12	13	14	Pos.	Points
2015	Bentley Team HTP	Bentley Continental GT3	Silver	NOG; QR	NOG; CR	BRH; QR	BRH; CR	**ZOL**; **QR**; 8	ZOL; CR; 6	MOS; QR	MOS; CR	ALG; QR	ALG; CR	MIS; QR	MIS; CR	ZAN; QR	ZAN; CR	6th	34
2017	GRT Grasser Racing Team	Lamborghini Huracán GT3	Pro	MIS; QR	MIS; CR	BRH; QR	BRH; CR	ZOL; QR	ZOL; CR	HUN; QR	HUN; CR	NÜR; QR; 15	NÜR; CR; 29					NC	0

=== Complete Formula E results ===
(key) (Races in bold indicate pole position; races in italics indicate fastest lap)

Year	Team	Chassis	Powertrain	1	2	3	4	5	6	7	8	9	10	11	12	13	Pos	Points
2016–17	Venturi Formula E Team	Spark SRT01-e	Venturi VM200-FE-02	HKG	MRK	BUE	MEX	MCO	PAR; 8	BER; 18	BER; 15	NYC; 13	NYC; 7	MTL; 10	MTL; 10		19th	12
2017–18	Venturi Formula E Team	Spark SRT01-e	Venturi VM200-FE-03	HKG	HKG	MRK	SCL	MEX	PDE	RME	PAR	BER; 13	ZUR	NYC; 4	NYC; Ret		18th	12
2018–19	Nio Formula E Team	Spark SRT05e	Nio Sport 004	ADR; 14	MRK; 17	SCL; Ret	MEX; 15	HKG; 12	SYX; 13	RME; 15	PAR; Ret	MCO; 14	BER; 19	BRN; 15	NYC; Ret	NYC; 14	23rd	0

=== Complete Super Formula results ===
(key) (Races in bold indicate pole position) (Races in italics indicate fastest lap)

Year	Team	Engine	1	2	3	4	5	6	7	DC	Points
2018	UOMO Sunoco Team LeMans	Toyota	SUZ	AUT; C	SUG; 4	FUJ; 10	MOT; 12	OKA; Ret	SUZ; 15	14th	5

=== 24 Hours of Le Mans results ===
Year	Team	Co-Drivers	Car	Class	Laps	Pos.	Class Pos.
2018	(Austria) ByKolles Racing Team	(United Kingdom) Oliver Webb (Austria) Dominik Kraihamer	ENSO CLM P1/01-Nismo	LMP1	65	DNF	DNF
2019	(Austria) ByKolles Racing Team	(United Kingdom) Oliver Webb (Italy) Paolo Ruberti	ENSO CLM P1/01-Gibson	LMP1	163	DNF	DNF
2020	(Austria) ByKolles Racing Team	(United Kingdom) Oliver Webb (Canada) Bruno Spengler	ENSO CLM P1/01-Gibson	LMP1	97	DNF	DNF
2023	(Austria) Floyd Vanwall Racing Team	(Argentina) Esteban Guerrieri (France) Tristan Vautier	Vanwall Vandervell 680-Gibson	Hypercar	165	DNF	DNF
2025	(Poland) Inter Europol Competition	(Poland) Jakub Śmiechowski (United Kingdom) Nick Yelloly	Oreca 07-Gibson	LMP2	367	18th	**1st**
2026	(Poland) Inter Europol Competition	(Poland) Jakub Śmiechowski (United Kingdom) Nick Yelloly	Oreca 07-Gibson	LMP2	361	16th	**1st**

=== Complete Asian Le Mans Series results ===
(key) (Races in bold indicate pole position) (Races in italics indicate fastest lap)

Year	Team	Class	Car	Engine	1	2	3	4	5	6	Pos.	Points
2023–24	DKR Engineering	LMP2	Oreca 07	Gibson GK428 4.2 L V8	SEP; 1; 3	SEP; 2; 6	DUB; 1; 4	ABU; 1; 3	ABU; 2; 4		5th	62
2024–25	Proton Competition	LMP2	Oreca 07	Gibson GK428 4.2 L V8	**SEP**; **1** DSQ	**SEP**; **2**; 4	**DUB**; **1**; 5	**DUB**; **2**; 4	**ABU**; **1**; 3	**ABU**; **2**; 6	5th	63
2025–26	Algarve Pro Racing	LMP2	Oreca 07	Gibson GK428 4.2 L V8	SEP; 1; 2	SEP; 2; 2	DUB; 1; 5	DUB; 2; 2	ABU; 1; 5	ABU; 2 Ret	3rd	74

=== Complete IMSA SportsCar Championship results ===
(key) (Races in bold indicate pole position; results in italics indicate fastest lap)

Year	Entrant	Class	Make	Engine	1	2	3	4	5	6	7	Rank	Points	Ref
2024	Inter Europol by PR1/Mathiasen Motorsports	LMP2	Oreca 07	Gibson GK428 4.2 L V8	DAY; 4	SEB; 6	WGL; 3	MOS; 1	ELK; 7	**IMS**; 2	PET; 4	1st	2227	
2025	Inter Europol Competition	LMP2	Oreca 07	Gibson GK428 4.2 L V8	DAY; 10	SEB; 1	WGL; 8	MOS; 10	ELK	IMS; 2	**PET**; 2	11th	1798	
2026	Inter Europol Competition	LMP2	Oreca 07	Gibson GK428 4.2 L V8	**DAY**; 2	SEB; 11	**WGL**; 4	**MOS**; 1	ELK; 1	**IMS**; 6	PET; 2	2nd	2302	

=== Complete European Le Mans Series results ===
(key) (Races in bold indicate pole position; results in italics indicate fastest lap)

Year	Entrant	Class	Chassis	Engine	1	2	3	4	5	6	Rank	Points
2024	Inter Europol Competition	LMP2	Oreca 07	Gibson GK428 4.2 L V8	CAT; 6	LEC; 1	IMO; 4	SPA; 2	MUG; 8	ALG; 4	2nd	81
2025	Inter Europol Competition	LMP2	Oreca 07	Gibson GK428 4.2 L V8	CAT; 10	**LEC**; 2	IMO; 2	SPA; 2	SIL; 2	ALG; 2	2nd	92
2026	Inter Europol Competition	LMP2	Oreca 07	Gibson GK428 4.2 L V8	CAT; 5	LEC; 7	IMO; 9	SPA; 1	**SIL**; 10	ALG; 3	5th	59

^{*} Season still in progress.

Sporting positions
Preceded by Laurens Vanthoor	German Formula Three Champion; 2010	Succeeded by Richie Stanaway
Preceded by Oliver Rowland (Formula Renault 3.5 Series)	Formula 3.5 V8; Champion; 2016	Succeeded by Pietro Fittipaldi
Preceded by Anthony Wells; Colin Noble	Le Mans Cup; LMP3 Champion; 2022; With: Alexander Mattschull	Succeeded by Gillian Henrion; Julien Gerbi
Preceded by Paul-Loup Chatin; Ben Keating	IMSA SportsCar Championship; LMP2 Champion; 2024; With: Nick Boulle	Succeeded by Dane Cameron; P. J. Hyett
