= Birgit Schrowange =

German television presenter

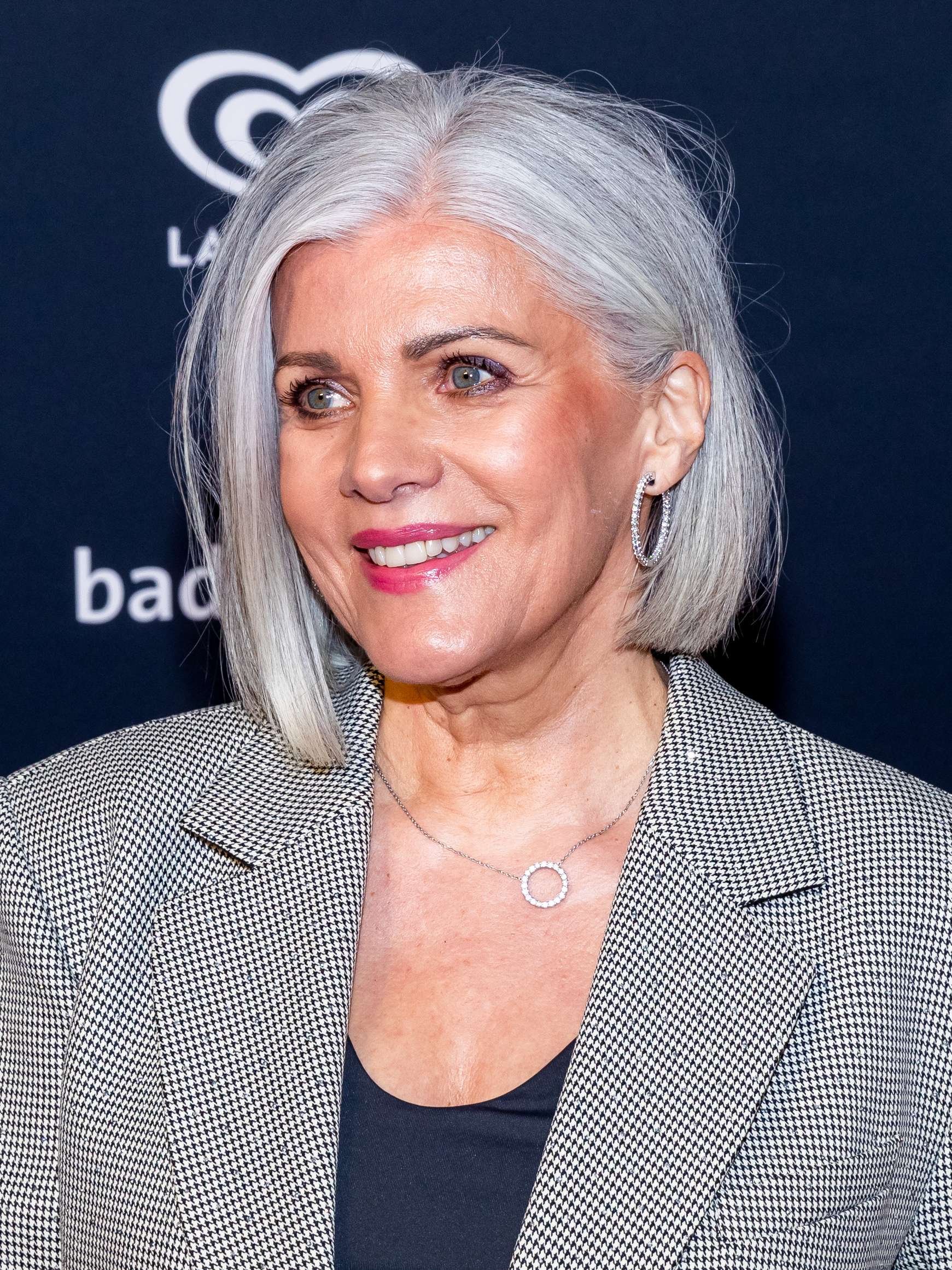
- Schrowange in 2024
- Born: April 7, 1958 (age 67); Nehden, North Rhine-Westphalia, West Germany
- Occupation: Television presenter

Birgit Schrowange (born Schrowangen; 7 April 1958) is a German television presenter. She has presented Extra – Das RTL-Magazin on RTL since October 1994. From 1995 to 2004, she presented a lifestyle magazine called Life! – Die Lust zu leben. Since February 1999, she has hosted Life! – Total verrückt with Dirk Penkwitz. From 1998 to 2006, she lived with television presenter Markus Lanz, with whom she has one son (born 2000).

== Honours ==
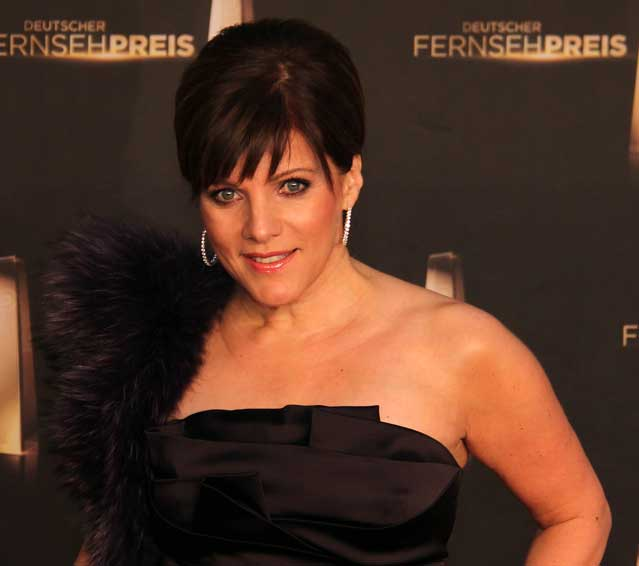
Schrowange at the 2012 German Television Awards

- 2008: Medal of Merit of the Order of Merit of the Federal Republic of Germany for her commitment against child poverty
- 2014: Emperor Augustus Order of the Trier Carnival Working Group for social engagement

== Literature ==
- Birgit Schrowange: So viel Lust zu leben. von Schröder, Munich 1998, ISBN 3-547-78075-6.
