= Carl Schlüter =

German sculptor

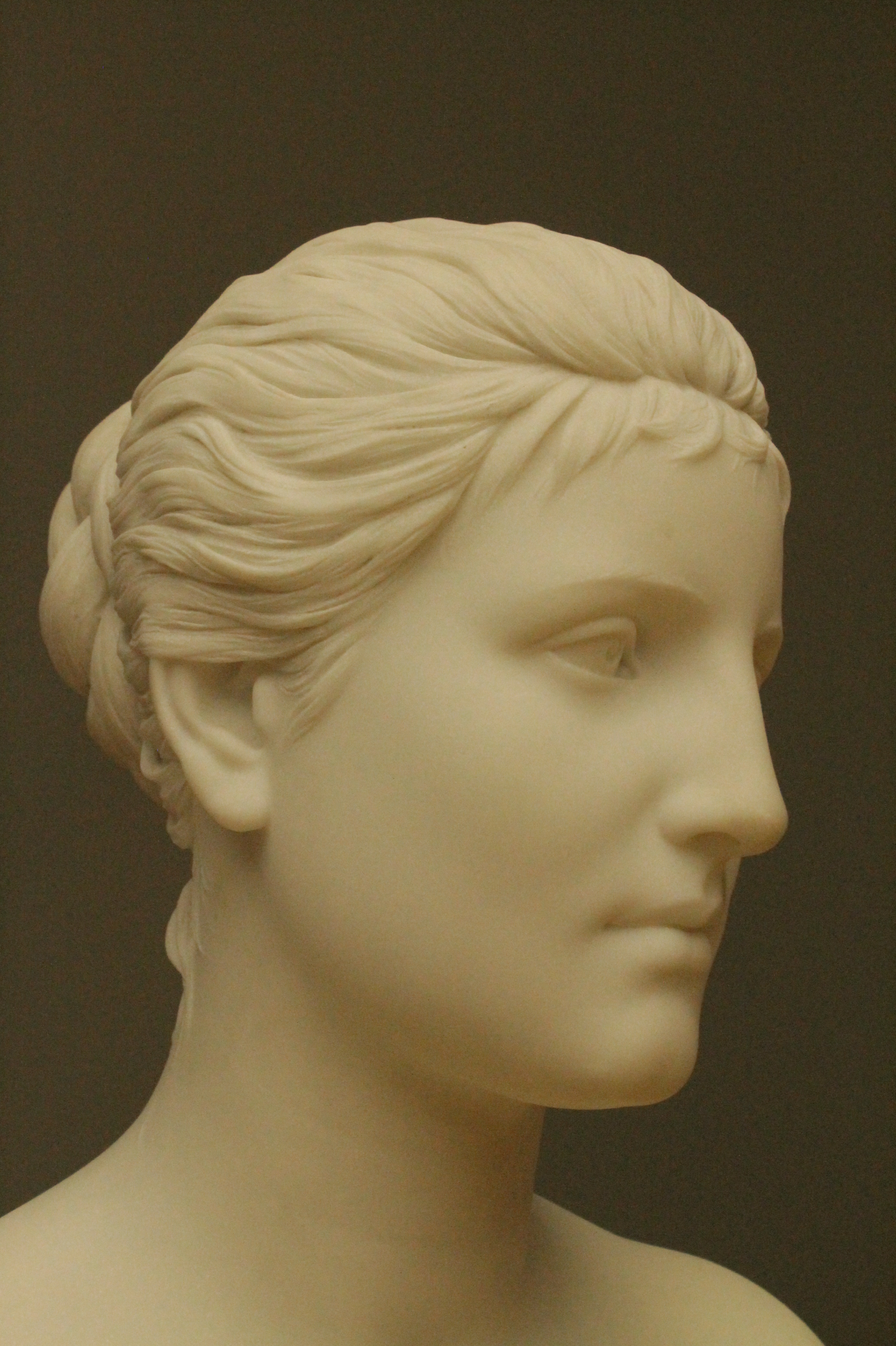
Fraulein Bierling by Carl Schlüter (1883), Albertinum, Dresden

Carl Schlüter (1846–1884) was a 19th-century German sculptor.

== Life ==
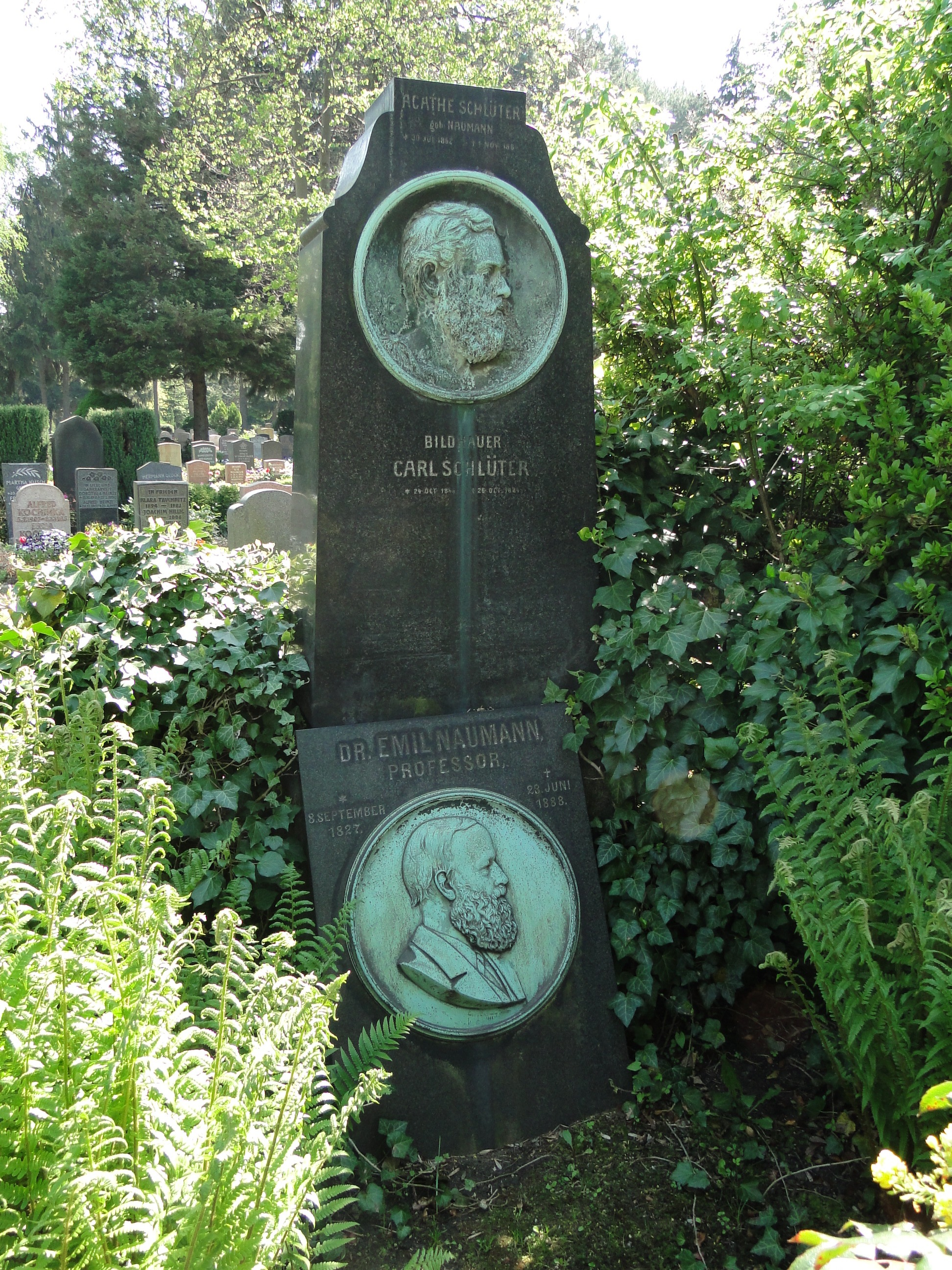
The grave of Carl Schlüter in Trinitatisfriedhof in Dresden

He was born in Pinneberg in north Germany on 24 October 1846. From 1865 to 1868 he studied at the Academy of Art in Dresden under John Schilling. He came to public note in 1871 winning a gold medal for sculpture at the Vienna World Fair. In 1873 the Prussian Ministry of Culture awarded him a two-year scholarship to study in Italy and he spent time in Venice, Bologna, Florence and Rome. He returned to live in Dresden in 1876.

His first major sale was in 1878: "Shepherd Boy" which was sold to the National Gallery, Berlin.

He died of Diphtheria on 26 October 1884 in Dresden aged only 38. He is buried in the Trinitatisfriedhof in north-east Dresden.

== Family ==
In August 1880, he married Agathe Naumann, daughter of the composer Emil Naumann.

== Works ==
The majority of his work is figurative, and he specialised in portrait busts, especially female subjects. Notable works include:

- The grave of sculptor Joseph Herrmann in the Old Catholic Cemetery in Dresden (1869)
- Shepherd Boy in bronze (1876)
- Shepherd Boy in marble (1878) destroyed in Berlin due to the Second World War
- Twelve portrait medallions on the Dresden Theatre (1878)
- Portrait bust of Agathe Schluter, his wife (1880) in the National Gallery in Berlin (considered to be his finest work).
