= Markus Lanz (talk show) =

German talk show

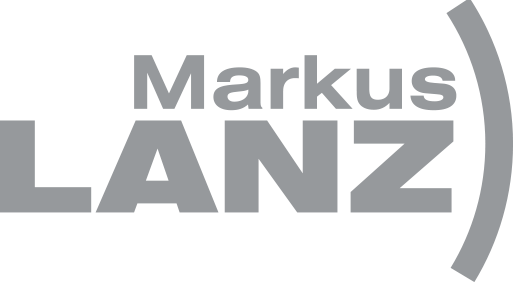
- Genre: Talk show
- Presented by: Markus Lanz
- Country of origin: Germany
- Original language: German
- No. of episodes: 2000+

Production
- Running time: 75 minutes

Original release
- Release: 3 June 2008

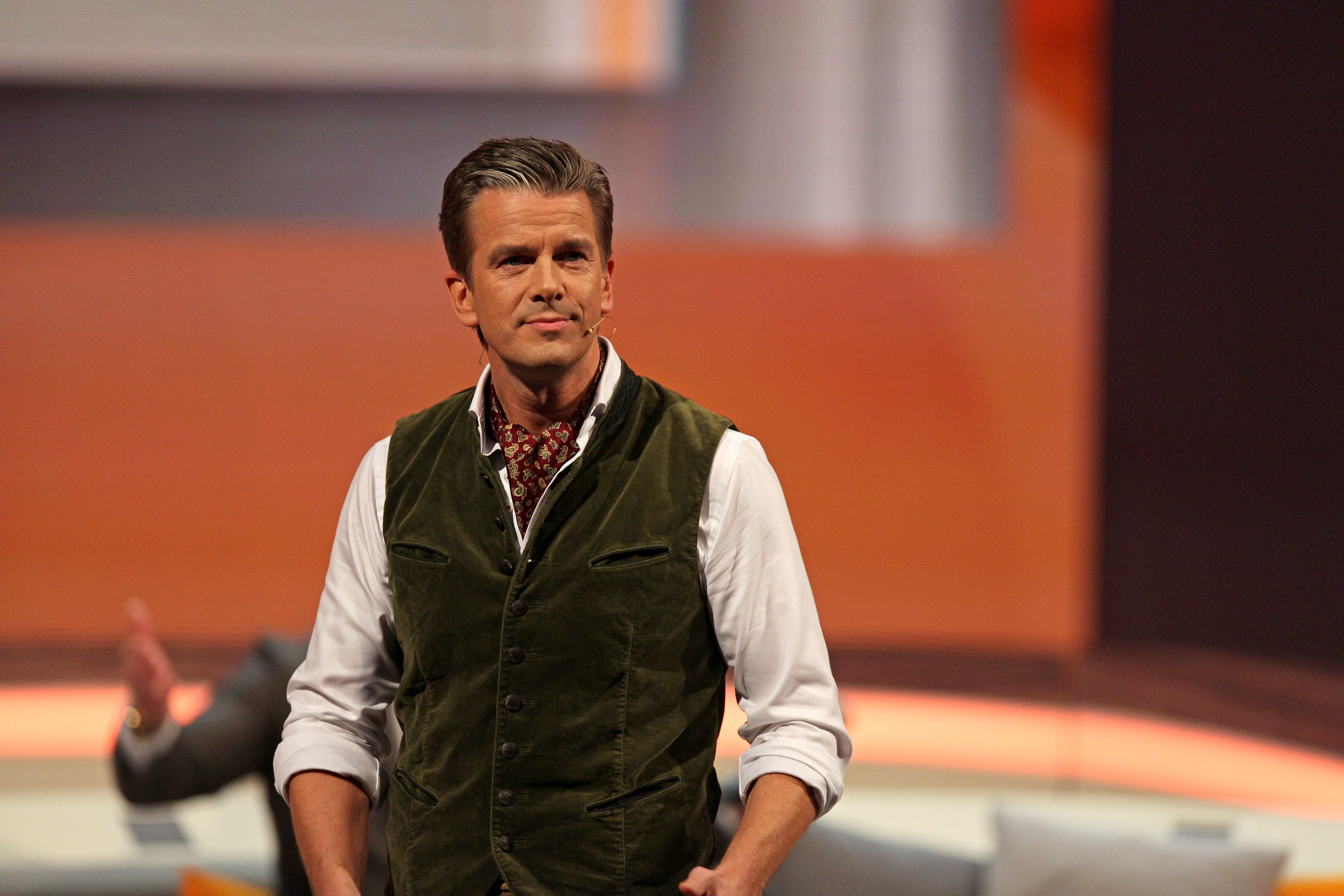
Presenter Markus Lanz in 2014

Markus Lanz is a German talk show on ZDF named after the host Markus Lanz, first aired on 3 June 2008. The 75-minute show airs on Tuesday, Wednesday, and Thursday nights. The program is recorded in a television studio in Hamburg-Altona, normally a few hours before it airs, but sometimes it is broadcast live.

== Content ==
The program does not have a general topic. In each issue, Lanz has four to five guests, with whom he usually speaks individually. At the beginning of the program, he introduces the guests, who are sitting together in a group, with some information on the respective topic. Lanz writes the texts for the introduction of the guests himself. Then he speaks to the guests one by one. The topics are about current political and social developments, news from the entertainment industry (for example a new film or book), sporting events or the individual life story of the conversation partner.

If it emerges from the situation, the other guests participate in the individual conversation or discuss it. Especially with current stories, sometimes several guests are invited on the same topic, for example a politician and a journalist. Musical or sporty duos and relatives can also perform together.

If a musical guest is on the show, he will often end up playing a current song. He is accompanied by the moderator on the piano.

== Audience ratings ==
Year	Episodes	Average range	Range (14–49 year olds)	Market share (total audience)	Market share (14–49 year olds)
2008	29	1,32 mio.	0,31 mio. (Note: The value refers to the average of the season ended in the year mentioned. Programs from the previous year are taken into account if they belong to the same season.)	11,2 %	5,4 %
2009	53	1,26 mio.	0,33 mio.	12,1 %	6,3 %
2010	96	1,29 mio.	0,27 mio.	10,9 %	5,1 %
2011	116	1,46 mio.	0,33 mio.	12,2 %	5,9 %
2012	135	1,49 mio.	0,35 mio.	13,1 %	6,8 %
2013	124	1,60 mio.	0,34 mio.	14,3 %	6,9 %
2014	129	1,42 Mio.		12,9 %	
2015	126	1,40 mio.		12,4 %	
2016	131	1,55 mio.		13,2 %	
2017	129	1,58 mio.		13,5 %	
2018	70 (Note: Only the parts of the first half of the year are taken into account.)	1,66 mio.		13,3 %	

== Criticism ==
In January 2014, an online petition was sent to the ZDF, which demanded the dismissal of Lanz. It received over 230,000 signatures within a few days. The petition responded to a conversation with the German politician Sahra Wagenknecht, during which the moderator repeatedly interrupted her and asked her suggestive questions. Lanz then regretted his behavior, which he described as „rustikal und sogar persönlich" ("rustic and even personal").
