= Tony Halbig =

German racing driver

Tony Halbig (born July 2, 1993 in Pinneberg) is a German racing driver.

== Career ==
Halbig began his racing career in karting 2007. He remained in karting until 2009. In 2011, he began his formula racing career. He competed in the German Formula Three Championship for Motopark Academy. He scored points in both races of his first round and finished the second race on the fourth position. He finished his only racing season on the ninth position with 22 points.

== Career summary ==
- 2007–2009: Karting
- 2011: German Formula Three Championship
