= 2011 German Formula Three Championship =

Seasons
- ← 2010 2012 →

The 2011 ATS Formel 3 Cup was the ninth edition of the German F3 Cup and the last one with FIA specification F3 engines. For the 2012 season, the series will use Volkswagen engines only. The season began on 23 April at Oschersleben and finished on 2 October at Hockenheim after nine race weekends, totalling eighteen races.

New Zealander Richie Stanaway clinched title on the penultimate round, becoming the first Kiwi to win the championship. Danish driver Marco Sørensen, despite missing the round at Assen, finished the season as runner-up. Third place was claimed by Austrian Klaus Bachler. Maxim Travin won the Trophy class after seven wins.

== Teams and drivers ==
Team	Chassis	Engine	No.	Driver	Status	Rounds
Cup Class
(Austria) HS Engineering	Dallara F305/037	Volkswagen	1	(Israel) Alon Day		All
(Austria) HS Engineering	Dallara F306/025	Volkswagen	2	(Germany) Patrick Schranner	R	1–4
(Austria) HS Engineering	Dallara F306/025	Volkswagen	2	(Germany) Riccardo Brutschin		6–9
(Netherlands) Van Amersfoort Racing	Dallara F306/038	Volkswagen	5	(New Zealand) Richie Stanaway	R	All
(Netherlands) Van Amersfoort Racing	Dallara F305/046	Volkswagen	6	(Netherlands) Jeroen Mul	R	All
(Netherlands) Van Amersfoort Racing	Dallara F306/023	Volkswagen	7	(Netherlands) Hannes van Asseldonk	R	All
(Sweden) Performance Racing	Dallara F305/051	Volkswagen	10	(Germany) Riccardo Brutschin		1–4
(Sweden) Performance Racing	Dallara F305/041	Volkswagen	11	(United Kingdom) Tom Blomqvist	R	1–7
(Sweden) Performance Racing	Dallara F305/041	Volkswagen	11	(Denmark) Dennis Lind	R	9
(Germany) Motopark	Dallara F306/034	Volkswagen	12	(Germany) Markus Pommer		1–3
(Germany) Motopark	Dallara F306/034	Volkswagen	14	(Germany) Tony Halbig	R	All
(Germany) Motopark	Dallara F305/016	Volkswagen	15	(Republic of Ireland) Gary Thompson		2
(Germany) Brandl Racing	Dallara F305/030	Mercedes	17	(Denmark) Marco Sørensen		1–7, 9
(Germany) Brandl Racing	Dallara F306/008	Mercedes	18	(Austria) Bernd Herndlhofer		1–2
(Germany) Brandl Racing	Dallara F306/008	Mercedes	18	(Czech Republic) Filip Salaquarda		5
(Switzerland) Jo Zeller Racing	Dallara F306/014	Mercedes	24	(Switzerland) Sandro Zeller		1–3
(Switzerland) Jo Zeller Racing	Dallara F306/014	Mercedes	24	(Germany) Markus Pommer		4–9
(Switzerland) Jo Zeller Racing	Dallara F305/011	Mercedes	25	(Austria) René Binder		1–2, 4–9
(Germany) URD Rennsport	Dallara F306/027	Mercedes	26	(Austria) Klaus Bachler	R	All
(Switzerland) Bordoli-Motorsport	Dallara F305/032	OPC Challenge	28	(Switzerland) Yannick Mettler	R	1–5, 8–9
(Russia) Max Travin Racing	Dallara F306/035	Volkswagen	30	(Russia) Nikolay Martsenko		All
(Georgia (country)) Stromos ArtLine	Dallara F305/033	OPC Challenge	33	(Estonia) Antti Rammo		1–2, 4–6, 8–9
(Belgium) APEX Engineering	Dallara F305/034	OPC Challenge	35	(Belgium) Jordi Weckx		2, 4, 9
(Austria) Franz Wöss Racing	Dallara F306/016	OPC Challenge	36	(Switzerland) Dominik Kocher	R	6, 9
(Austria) Franz Wöss Racing	Dallara F305/062	OPC Challenge	37	(Austria) Stefan Neuburger		6
(Austria) Franz Wöss Racing	Dallara F305/062	OPC Challenge	37	(Germany) Francesco Lopez		9
Trophy Class
(Georgia (country)) Stromos ArtLine	ArtTech F24C/010	OPC Challenge	50	(Russia) Mikhail Aleshin		9
(Georgia (country)) Stromos ArtLine	ArtTech F24C/010	Mercedes	50	(Russia) Mikhail Aleshin		1, 6, 8
(Georgia (country)) Stromos ArtLine	ArtTech F24C/010	Mercedes	50	(Finland) Daniel Aho		4
(Georgia (country)) Stromos ArtLine	ArtTech F24C/010	Mercedes	50	(France) Tom Dillmann		5
(Georgia (country)) Stromos ArtLine	ArtTech F24/008	OPC Challenge	50	(Russia) Ivan Samarin		2
(Russia) Max Travin Racing	Dallara F303/021	OPC Challenge	54	(Russia) Maxim Travin		All
(Germany) Rhino's Leipert Motorsport	Dallara F304/012	Opel	55	(Italy) Luca Iannaccone		All

Icon	Class
C	Cup
T	Trophy
Icon	Status
R	Rookie

== Calendar ==
The provisional 2011 calendar consisted of nine meetings of which five were due to take place in Germany. A support race to the World Series by Renault meeting at the Nürburgring was later dropped from the calendar in favour of an additional foreign round at Belgium's Spa-Francorchamps. The Rizla Race Day at Assen was also replaced with a Superleague Formula meeting at the circuit.

The final calendar consists of nine meetings of which seven are part of the ADAC Masters Weekend package.

Round		Circuit	Date	Pole position	Fastest lap	Winning driver	Winning team	Secondary Class winner	Supporting
1	R1	(Germany) Oschersleben	23 April	(United Kingdom) Tom Blomqvist	(New Zealand) Richie Stanaway	(New Zealand) Richie Stanaway	(Netherlands) Van Amersfoort Racing	T: (Russia) Mikhail Aleshin; R: (New Zealand) Richie Stanaway	ADAC Masters Weekend
1	R2	(Germany) Oschersleben	24 April	(Netherlands) Hannes van Asseldonk	(New Zealand) Richie Stanaway	(New Zealand) Richie Stanaway	(Netherlands) Van Amersfoort Racing	T: (Russia) Mikhail Aleshin; R: (New Zealand) Richie Stanaway	ADAC Masters Weekend
2	R1	(Belgium) Spa-Francorchamps	6 May	(Denmark) Marco Sørensen	(Denmark) Marco Sørensen	(Denmark) Marco Sørensen	(Germany) Brandl Racing	T: (Russia) Ivan Samarin; R: (New Zealand) Richie Stanaway	1000 km Spa
2	R2	(Belgium) Spa-Francorchamps	7 May	(Denmark) Marco Sørensen	(Denmark) Marco Sørensen	(New Zealand) Richie Stanaway	(Netherlands) Van Amersfoort Racing	T: (Russia) Maxim Travin; R: (New Zealand) Richie Stanaway	1000 km Spa
3	R1	(Germany) Sachsenring	14 May	(New Zealand) Richie Stanaway	(United Kingdom) Tom Blomqvist	(New Zealand) Richie Stanaway	(Netherlands) Van Amersfoort Racing	T: (Russia) Maxim Travin; R: (New Zealand) Richie Stanaway	ADAC Masters Weekend
3	R2	(Germany) Sachsenring	15 May	(Israel) Alon Day	(Austria) Klaus Bachler	(Austria) Klaus Bachler	(Germany) URD Rennsport	T: (Russia) Maxim Travin; R: (Austria) Klaus Bachler	ADAC Masters Weekend
4	R1	(Netherlands) TT Circuit Assen	4 June	(New Zealand) Richie Stanaway	(Israel) Alon Day	(New Zealand) Richie Stanaway	(Netherlands) Van Amersfoort Racing	T: (Finland) Daniel Aho; R: (New Zealand) Richie Stanaway	Superleague Formula
4	R2	(Netherlands) TT Circuit Assen	5 June	(New Zealand) Richie Stanaway	(New Zealand) Richie Stanaway	(New Zealand) Richie Stanaway	(Netherlands) Van Amersfoort Racing	T: (Finland) Daniel Aho; R: (New Zealand) Richie Stanaway	Superleague Formula
5	R1	(Belgium) Zolder	11 June	(New Zealand) Richie Stanaway	(Germany) Markus Pommer	(New Zealand) Richie Stanaway	(Netherlands) Van Amersfoort Racing	T: (Russia) Maxim Travin; R: (New Zealand) Richie Stanaway	ADAC Masters Weekend
5	R2	(Belgium) Zolder	12 June	(United Kingdom) Tom Blomqvist	(United Kingdom) Tom Blomqvist	(United Kingdom) Tom Blomqvist	(Sweden) Performance Racing	T: (France) Tom Dillmann; R: (United Kingdom) Tom Blomqvist	ADAC Masters Weekend
6	R1	(Austria) Red Bull Ring	13 August	(New Zealand) Richie Stanaway	(Israel) Alon Day	(New Zealand) Richie Stanaway	(Netherlands) Van Amersfoort Racing	T: (Russia) Mikhail Aleshin; R: (New Zealand) Richie Stanaway	ADAC Masters Weekend
6	R2	(Austria) Red Bull Ring	14 August	(New Zealand) Richie Stanaway	(New Zealand) Richie Stanaway	(New Zealand) Richie Stanaway	(Netherlands) Van Amersfoort Racing	T: (Russia) Mikhail Aleshin; R: (New Zealand) Richie Stanaway	ADAC Masters Weekend
7	R1	(Germany) Lausitzring	3 September	(New Zealand) Richie Stanaway	(New Zealand) Richie Stanaway	(Denmark) Marco Sørensen	(Germany) Brandl Racing	T: (Russia) Maxim Travin; R: (New Zealand) Richie Stanaway	ADAC Masters Weekend
7	R2	(Germany) Lausitzring	4 September	(New Zealand) Richie Stanaway	(New Zealand) Richie Stanaway	(New Zealand) Richie Stanaway	(Netherlands) Van Amersfoort Racing	T: (Russia) Maxim Travin; R: (New Zealand) Richie Stanaway	ADAC Masters Weekend
8	R1	(Netherlands) TT Circuit Assen	17 September	(Netherlands) Hannes van Asseldonk	(Netherlands) Hannes van Asseldonk	(Austria) Klaus Bachler	(Germany) URD Rennsport	T: (Russia) Mikhail Aleshin; R: (Austria) Klaus Bachler	ADAC Masters Weekend
8	R2	(Netherlands) TT Circuit Assen	18 September	(New Zealand) Richie Stanaway	(Germany) Markus Pommer	(New Zealand) Richie Stanaway	(Netherlands) Van Amersfoort Racing	T: (Russia) Maxim Travin; R: (New Zealand) Richie Stanaway	ADAC Masters Weekend
9	R1	(Germany) Hockenheimring	1 October	(Germany) Markus Pommer	(New Zealand) Richie Stanaway	(New Zealand) Richie Stanaway	(Netherlands) Van Amersfoort Racing	T: (Russia) Mikhail Aleshin; R: (New Zealand) Richie Stanaway	ADAC Masters Weekend
9	R2	(Germany) Hockenheimring	2 October	(New Zealand) Richie Stanaway	(New Zealand) Richie Stanaway	(New Zealand) Richie Stanaway	(Netherlands) Van Amersfoort Racing	T: (Russia) Mikhail Aleshin; R: (New Zealand) Richie Stanaway	ADAC Masters Weekend

== Championship standings ==
=== Overall ===
- Points were awarded as follows:

1	2	3	4	5	6	7	8	PP	FL
10	8	6	5	4	3	2	1	**1**	1

Pos	Driver	OSC (Germany)		SPA (Belgium)		SAC (Germany)		ASS (Netherlands)		ZOL (Belgium)		RBR (Austria)		LAU (Germany)		ASS (Netherlands)		HOC (Germany)		Points
1	(New Zealand) Richie Stanaway	1	1	2	1	**1**	4	**1**	**1**	**1**	5	**1**	**1**	**2**	**1**	2	**1**	1	**1**	181
2	(Denmark) Marco Sørensen	3	2	**1**	**2**	2	2	2	7	3	2	2	2	1	2			2	2	126
3	(Austria) Klaus Bachler	Ret	13	4	3	3	1	3	3	2	7	6	13	4	4	1	4	9	Ret	79
4	(Israel) Alon Day	4	6	3	6	4	**9**	5	6	6	6	5	4	7	Ret	6	3	Ret	5	62
5	(Netherlands) Hannes van Asseldonk	5	**8**	8	Ret	8	11	7	Ret	4	3	3	3	Ret	3	**3**	5	4	4	61
6	(United Kingdom) Tom Blomqvist	**2**	Ret	5	5	13	3	4	4	Ret	**1**	4	7	3	Ret					59
7	(Germany) Markus Pommer	12	DNS	Ret	11	9	8	10	2	5	4	7	5	9	5	8	2	**3**	3	52
8	(Austria) René Binder	6	3	Ret	4			6	Ret	15†	9	10	9	11	7	7	DNS	5	9	26
9	(Germany) Tony Halbig	8	4	10	12	16	5	Ret	9	8	10	8	6	6	9	10	Ret	8	7	22
10	(Netherlands) Jeroen Mul	11	Ret	17	7	7	Ret	8	8	10	8	Ret	12	5	6	5	Ret	10	10	18
11	(Germany) Patrick Schranner	7	5	9	9	5	6	9	5											17
12	(Russia) Nikolay Martsenko	14	Ret	13	15	12	13	12	11	11	16	11	10	10	8	4	6	11	Ret	9
13	(Germany) Riccardo Brutschin	10	Ret	Ret	13	6	10	Ret	10			12	8	8	Ret	9	DNS	7	Ret	8
14	(Austria) Bernd Herndlhofer	9	7	6	10															5
15	(Switzerland) Sandro Zeller	13	11	7	8	10	7													5
16	(Russia) Mikhail Aleshin	16	10									9	11			11	Ret	15	6	3
17	(Estonia) Antti Rammo	15	12	15	17			13	14	9	14	13	15			14	7	14	12	2
18	(Czech Republic) Filip Salaquarda									7	12									2
19	(Russia) Maxim Travin	17	14	16	18	14	12	15	15	12	15	15	17	12	10	13	8	18	16	1
—	(Switzerland) Yannick Mettler	19	9	11	14	11	DSQ	11	12	Ret	13					12	Ret	Ret	14	0
—	(Italy) Luca Iannaccone	18	15	18	19	15	14	16	16	13	17	17	18	13	11	15	9	17	17	0
—	(Belgium) Jordi Weckx			14	16													12	11	0
—	(France) Tom Dillmann									14†	11									0
—	(Russia) Ivan Samarin			12	20															0
—	(Germany) Francesco Lopez																	13	13	0
—	(Finland) Daniel Aho							14	13											0
—	(Switzerland) Dominik Kocher											14	14					16	15	0
—	(Austria) Stefan Neuburger											16	16							0
—	(Republic of Ireland) Gary Thompson			DNS	DNS															0
Guest driver ineligible for points
—	(Denmark) Dennis Lind																	6	8	0
Pos	Driver	OSC (Germany)		SPA (Belgium)		SAC (Germany)		ASS (Netherlands)		ZOL (Belgium)		RBR (Austria)		LAU (Germany)		ASS (Netherlands)		HOC (Germany)		Points

Colour	Result
Gold	Winner
Silver	Second place
Bronze	Third place
Green	Points classification
Blue	Non-points classification
Blue	Non-classified finish (NC)
Purple	Retired, not classified (Ret)
Red	Did not qualify (DNQ)
Red	Did not pre-qualify (DNPQ)
Black	Disqualified (DSQ)
White	Did not start (DNS)
White	Withdrew (WD)
White	Race cancelled (C)
Blank	Did not practice (DNP)
Blank	Did not arrive (DNA)
Blank	Excluded (EX)

**Bold** – Pole
Italics – Fastest Lap

- † — Drivers did not finish the race, but were classified as they completed over 90% of the race distance.

=== Trophy ===
- Points were awarded as follows:

1	2	3	4	5	6	7	8
10	8	6	5	4	3	2	1

Pos	Driver	OSC (Germany)		SPA (Belgium)		SAC (Germany)		ASS (Netherlands)		ZOL (Belgium)		RBR (Austria)		LAU (Germany)		ASS (Netherlands)		HOC (Germany)		Points
1	(Russia) Maxim Travin	17	14	16	18	14	**12**	15	15	12	15	15	17	**12**	**10**	13	8	18	16	156
2	(Italy) Luca Iannaccone	18	15	18	19	**15**	14	16	16	13	17	17	18	13	11	15	9	17	17	124
3	(Russia) Mikhail Aleshin	**16**	**10**									**9**	**11**			**11**	**Ret**	**15**	**6**	70
4	(Finland) Daniel Aho							**14**	**13**											20
5	(France) Tom Dillmann									**14**†	**11**									16
6	(Russia) Ivan Samarin			**12**	**20**															16
Pos	Driver	OSC (Germany)		SPA (Belgium)		SAC (Germany)		ASS (Netherlands)		ZOL (Belgium)		RBR (Austria)		LAU (Germany)		ASS (Netherlands)		HOC (Germany)		Points

- † — Drivers did not finish the race, but were classified as they completed over 90% of the race distance.

=== SONAX Rookie-Pokal ===
Pos	Driver	OSC (Germany)		SPA (Belgium)		SAC (Germany)		ASS (Netherlands)		ZOL (Belgium)		RBR (Austria)		LAU (Germany)		ASS (Netherlands)		HOC (Germany)		Points
1	(New Zealand) Richie Stanaway	1	1	2	1	1	4	1	1	1	5	1	1	2	1	2	1	1	1	170
2	(Austria) Klaus Bachler	Ret	13	4	3	3	1	3	3	2	7	6	13	4	4	1	4	9	Ret	109
3	(Netherlands) Hannes van Asseldonk	5	8	8	Ret	8	11	7	Ret	4	3	3	3	Ret	3	3	5	4	4	94
4	(United Kingdom) Tom Blomqvist	2	Ret	5	5	13	3	4	4	Ret	1	4	7	3	Ret					71
5	(Germany) Tony Halbig	8	4	10	12	16	5	Ret	9	8	10	8	6	6	9	10	Ret	8	7	69
6	(Netherlands) Jeroen Mul	11	Ret	17	7	7	Ret	8	8	10	8	Ret	12	5	6	5	Ret	10	10	58
7	(Germany) Patrick Schranner	7	5	9	9	5	6	9	5											37
8	(Switzerland) Yannick Mettler	19	9	11	14	11	DSQ	11	12	Ret	13					12	Ret	Ret	14	26
9	(Switzerland) Dominik Kocher											14	14					16	15	11
Guest driver ineligible for points
—	(Denmark) Dennis Lind																	6	8	0
Pos	Driver	OSC (Germany)		SPA (Belgium)		SAC (Germany)		ASS (Netherlands)		ZOL (Belgium)		RBR (Austria)		LAU (Germany)		ASS (Netherlands)		HOC (Germany)		Points

== See also ==
- 2011 Formula 3 Euro Series season
