= Dirk Penkwitz =

German television host

Dirk Penkwitz (born 1969 in Pinneberg, Germany) is a German television host.

Penkwitz visited the Axel-Springer-Akademie and hosted Punkt 12, Life! Die Lust zu Leben and Life! - Total verrückt, by RTL.

Since February 19, 1999, he has been hosting Life! - Total verrückt with Birgit Schrowange.

Since March 10, 2003, he presentates the Super RTL Talkshow clipshow Voll Total.

In 2007, Penkwitz took on hosting of the music-clipshow Alle Hits and the show Guinness World Records - Die verrücktesten Rekorde aus aller Welt.

In 2008, he was backstage at RTL's show Das Supertalent.
