= Markus Lanz =

Italian television presenter

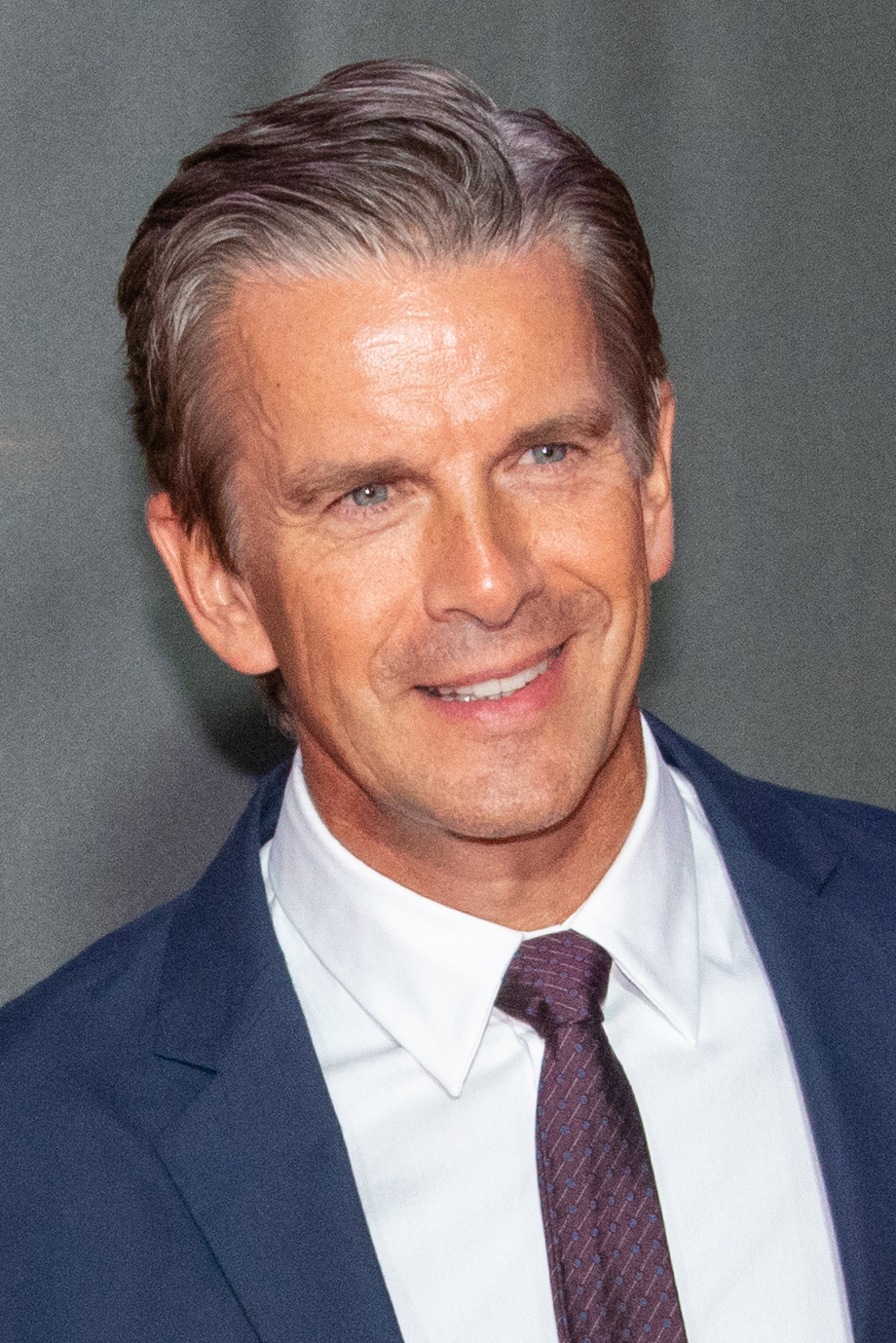
- Lanz in 2021
- Born: 16 March 1969 (age 57); Bruneck, South Tyrol, Italy
- Citizenship: Italy; Germany
- Occupations: Television presenter; host; producer
- Years active: 1991–present
- Spouse: Angela Gessmann (m. 2011)
- Partner: Birgit Schrowange (1998–2006)
- Children: 3

Markus Lanz (born 16 March 1969) is an Italian-German journalist, television presenter and talk show host, based in Germany.

== Early life ==
Lanz is a member of the German-speaking majority in the Italian province of South Tyrol. He grew up in Geiselsberg, a village located 1,344 metres above sea level in the central Alps. Lanz stated that his family was poor, and that his father died at an early age, leaving his mother to care for three children. His good school grades earned him a scholarship to the monastery of Neustift, where he went to private Catholic secondary school. He finished high school at the Humanistisches Gymnasium in Bruneck in 1988 and completed military service as a radio operator in the alpine division of the Italian army before working at the radio station Radio Holiday. In 1992, Lanz completed a vocational training course in communications at the Bayerische Akademie für Werbung und Marketing.

== Career ==
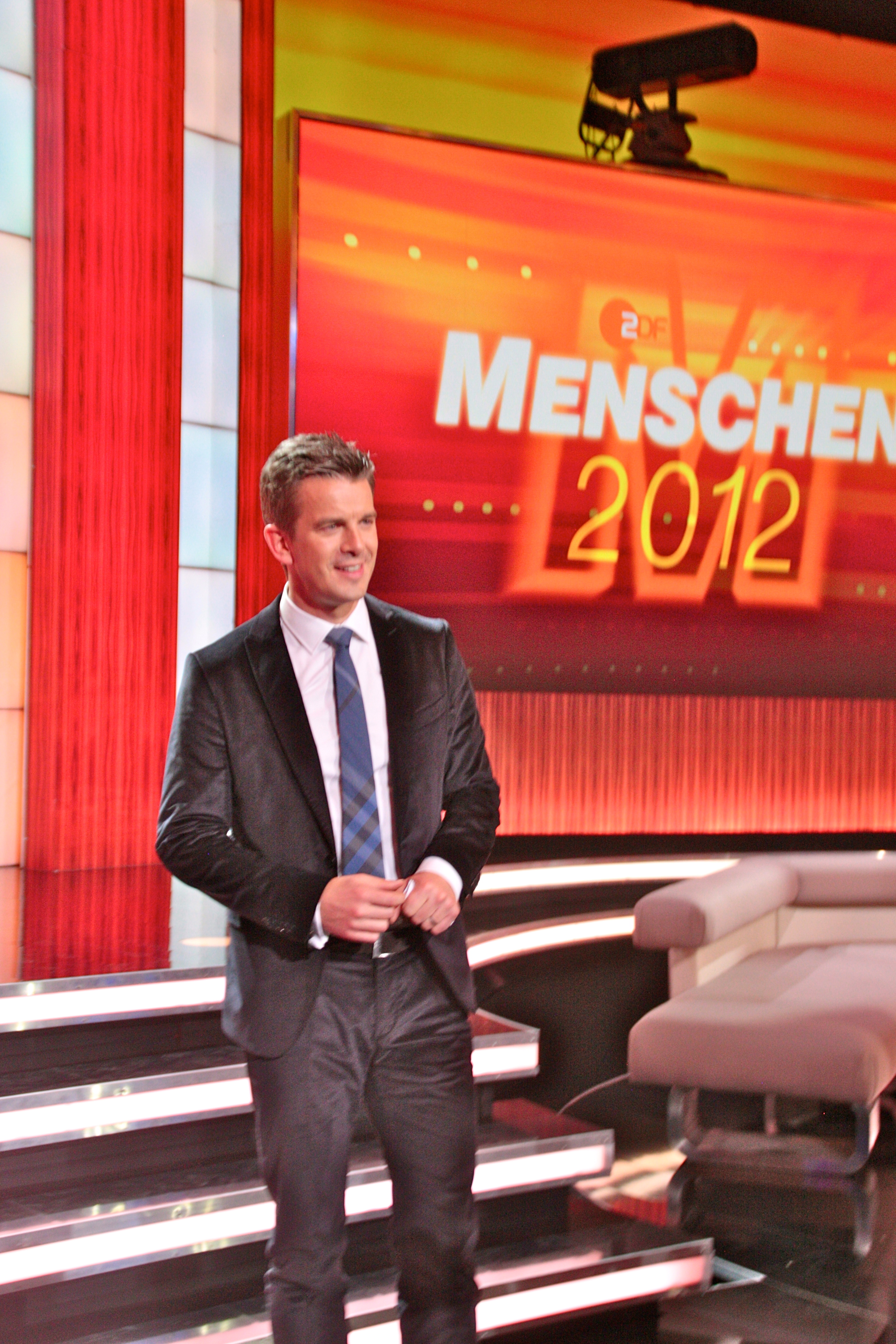
Lanz presenting Menschen 2012

In 1992, Lanz started a two-year trainee program at Radio Hamburg in Hamburg. In 1995, he became the news announcer at the regional TV station RTL North, and in 1997, started as presenter of a regional evening news show in Schleswig-Holstein.

Since 2008, Lanz has hosted the weekly cooking show Lanz kocht!

Since October 2009, he has hosted the talk show Markus Lanz three evenings a week.

Between October 2012 and 2014, he presented the monthly German TV show Wetten, dass..? as successor to Thomas Gottschalk.

== Private life ==
Lanz plays the piano and founded the band "W5" in which he played with his brother. He has a son (born 2000) from a previous relationship with TV presenter Birgit Schrowange. In July 2011, Lanz married Angela Gessmann. Lanz is a Roman-Catholic.

== Books ==
- Lanz, Markus (2007). Und plötzlich guckst du bis zum lieben Gott : die zwei Leben des Horst Lichter (in German). Gütersloh: Gütersloher Verlagshaus. ISBN 978-3-579-06459-8. OCLC 244573814.
- Lanz, Markus (2010). Grönland meine Reisen ans Ende der Welt (in German). Hamburg. ISBN 978-3-86690-195-7. OCLC 664386847.
