= Pinneberg-Land =

- Former Amt
- Map of Pinneberg highlighting Pinneberg-Land
- Country: Germany
- State: Schleswig-Holstein
- District: Pinneberg
- Distablished: 1 January 2007
- Region seat: Pinneberg

Area
  - Total: 41.74 km^{2} (16.12 sq mi)

Pinneberg-Land was an Amt ("collective municipality") in the district of Pinneberg, in Schleswig-Holstein, Germany. It was situated around Pinneberg, which was the seat of the Amt, but not part of it. In January 2007, it was merged with the Amt Bönningstedt to form the Amt Pinnau.

The Amt Pinneberg-Land consisted of the following municipalities (population in 2005 between brackets):

- Borstel-Hohenraden (2.148)
- Kummerfeld (2.102)
- Prisdorf (2.209)
- Tangstedt (2.127)
