= Bönningstedt (Amt) =

- Former amt
- Map of Pinneberg highlighting Bönningstedt
- Country: Germany
- State: Schleswig-Holstein
- District: Pinneberg
- Distablished: 1 January 2007
- Region seat: Bönningstedt

Area
  - Total: 32.23 km^{2} (12.44 sq mi)

Bönningstedt was an Amt ("collective municipality") in the district of Pinneberg, in Schleswig-Holstein, Germany. Its seat was in Bönningstedt. In January 2007, it was merged with the Amt Pinneberg-Land to form the Amt Pinnau.

The Amt Bönningstedt consisted of the following municipalities (population in 2005 between brackets):

- Bönningstedt
- Ellerbek
- Hasloh
