= Bevern =

Bevern is the name of the following places in Germany:

- Bevern, Schleswig-Holstein, a municipality in the district of Pinneberg, Schleswig-Holstein
- Bevern, Lower Saxony, a municipality in the district of Holzminden, Lower Saxony
- Bevern (Samtgemeinde), in Lower Saxony
- A place near Essen (Oldenburg)
