= List of cities in Schleswig-Holstein by population =

The following list sorts all cities and communes in the German state of Schleswig-Holstein with a population of more than 15,000. As of December 31, 2017, 35 cities fulfill this criterion and are listed here. This list refers only to the population of individual municipalities within their defined limits, which does not include other municipalities or suburban areas within urban agglomerations.

== List ==
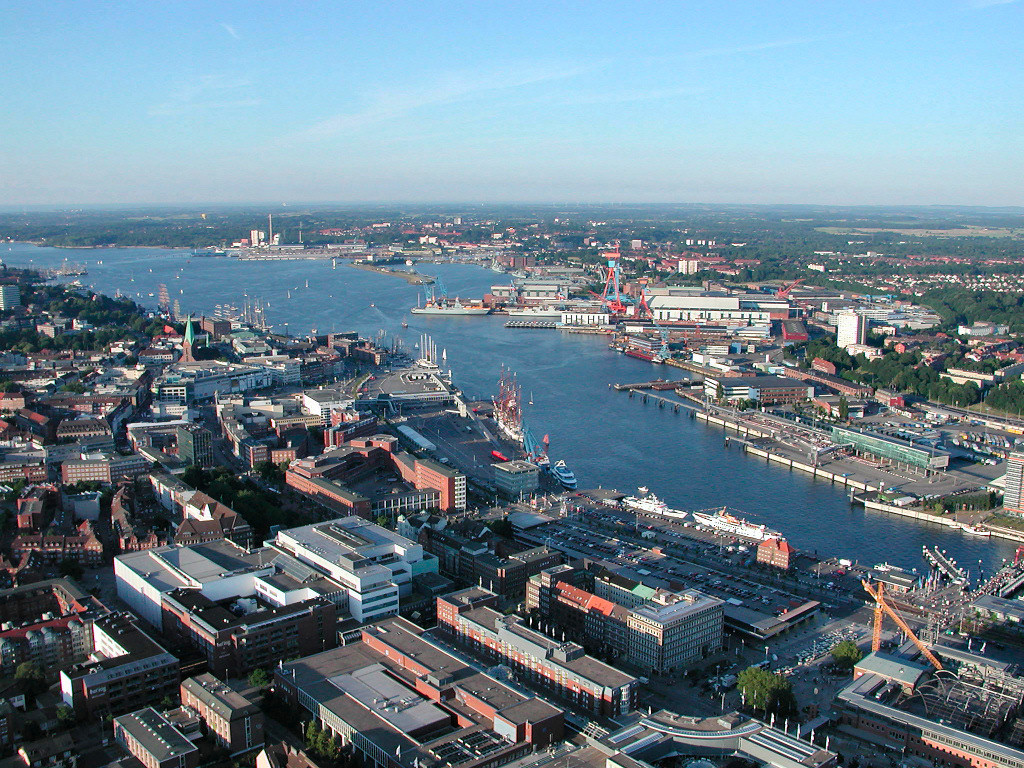
Kiel

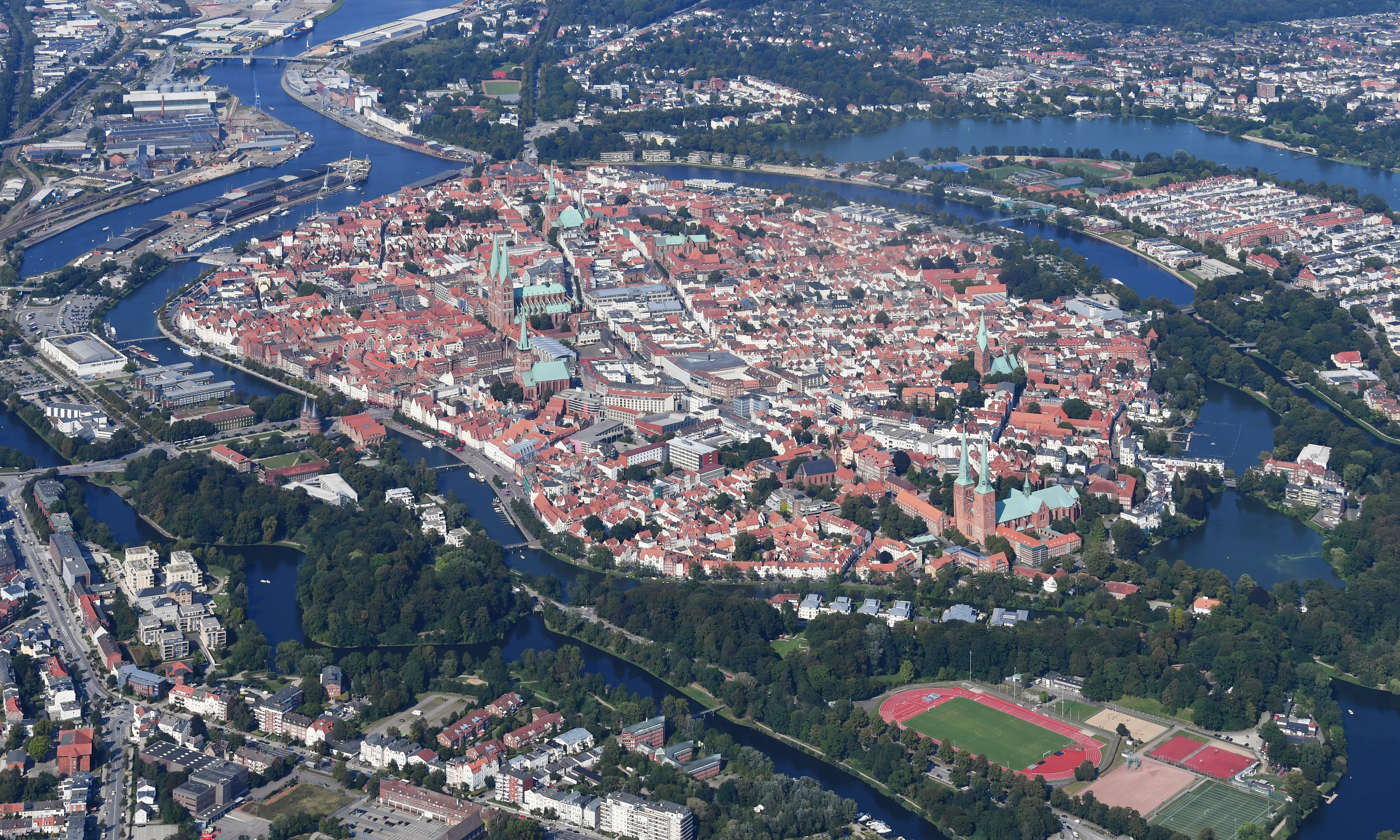
Lübeck

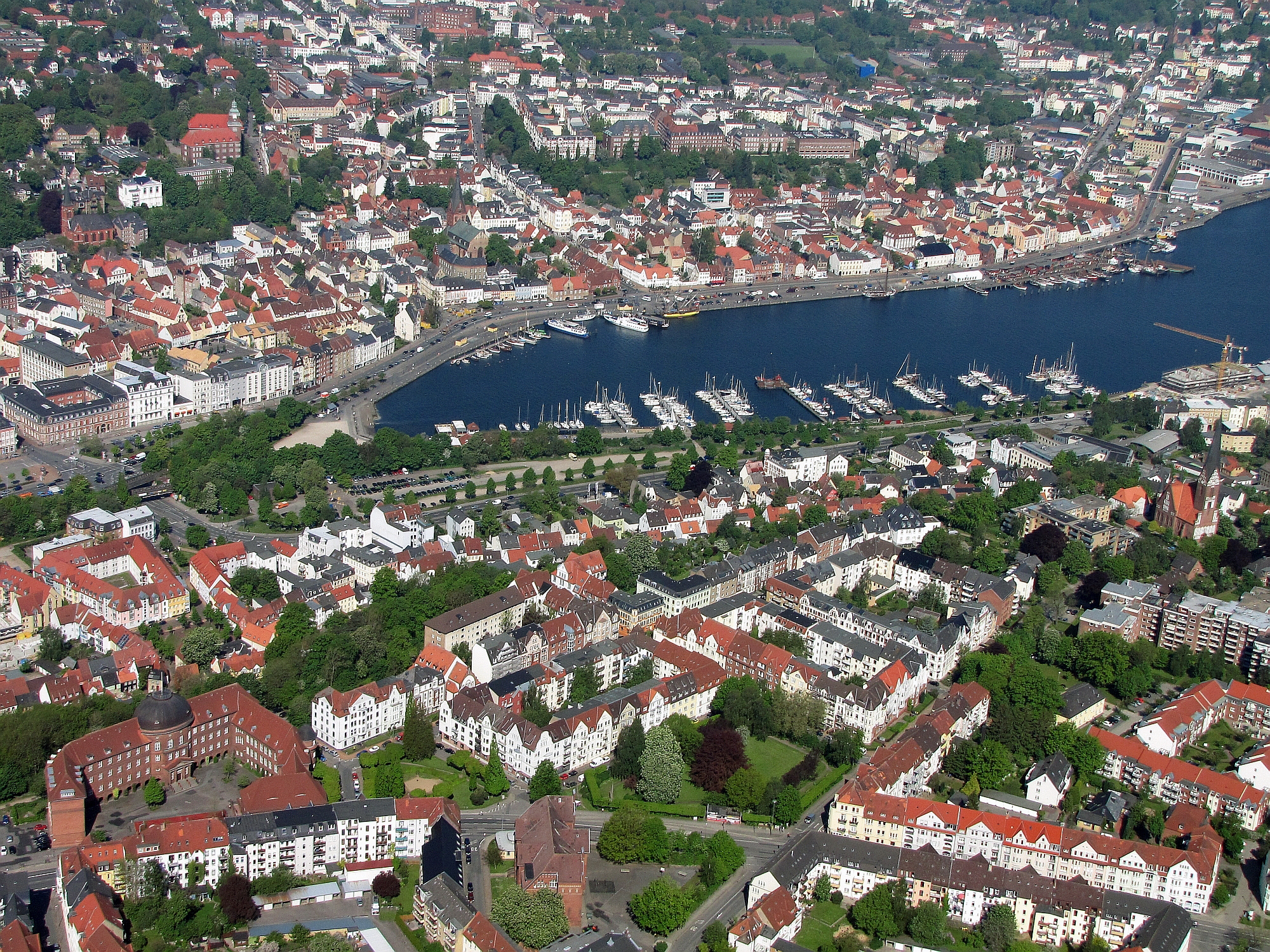
Flensburg

The following table lists the 35 cities and communes in Schleswig-Holstein with a population of at least 15,000 on December 31, 2017, as estimated by the Federal Statistical Office of Germany. A city is displayed in bold if it is a state or federal capital.

1. The city rank by population as of December 31, 2017, as estimated by the Federal Statistical Office of German
2. The city name
3. The name of the district (Landkreis) in which the city lies (some cities are districts on their own called urban districts)
4. The city population as of December 31, 2017, as estimated by the Federal Statistical Office of Germany
5. The city population as of May 9, 2011, as enumerated by the 2011 European Union census
6. The city land area as of December 31, 2017
7. The city population density as of December 31, 2017 (residents per unit of land area)

2017 rank	City	District	2017 estimate	2011 census	2017 land area	2017 pop. density
1	**Kiel**	urban district	247,943	235,782	119 km²	2,090/km²
2	Lübeck	urban district	216,318	210,305	214 km²	1,010/km²
3	Flensburg	urban district	88,519	82,258	56.7 km²	1,560/km²
4	Neumünster	urban district	79,335	77,249	71.6 km²	1,108/km²
5	Norderstedt	Segeberg	78,679	73,913	58.1 km²	1,354/km²
6	Elmshorn	Pinneberg	49,618	47,459	21.4 km²	2,322/km²
7	Pinneberg	Pinneberg	43,155	41,137	21.5 km²	2,003/km²
8	Wedel	Pinneberg	33,347	31,248	33.8 km²	986.0/km²
9	Ahrensburg	Stormarn	33,305	31,380	35.3 km²	943.5/km²
10	Itzehoe	Steinburg	31,848	30,885	28.0 km²	1,136/km²
11	Geesthacht	Herzogtum Lauenburg	30,407	28,755	33.3 km²	914.5/km²
12	Rendsburg	Rendsburg-Eckernförde	28,789	27,594	23.7 km²	1,213/km²
13	Henstedt-Ulzburg	Segeberg	28,056	26,658	39.5 km²	710.8/km²
14	Reinbek	Stormarn	27,409	26,169	31.2 km²	877.6/km²
15	Schleswig	Schleswig-Flensburg	25,118	23,701	24.3 km²	1,034/km²
16	Bad Oldesloe	Stormarn	24,964	24,263	52.6 km²	474.6/km²
17	Husum	Nordfriesland	23,274	22,215	25.8 km²	901.7/km²
18	Eckernförde	Rendsburg-Eckernförde	21,979	21,943	21.4 km²	1,028/km²
19	Heide	Dithmarschen	21,699	20,768	32.0 km²	678.7/km²
20	Kaltenkirchen	Segeberg	21,386	19,709	23.1 km²	925.8/km²
21	Quickborn	Pinneberg	21,056	19,727	43.2 km²	487.7/km²
22	Bad Schwartau	Ostholstein	19,997	19,436	18.4 km²	1,087/km²
23	Schenefeld	Pinneberg	19,141	18,197	10.0 km²	1,916/km²
24	Mölln	Herzogtum Lauenburg	18,928	18,398	25.1 km²	755.6/km²
25	Uetersen	Pinneberg	18,429	17,456	11.4 km²	1,612/km²
26	Glinde	Stormarn	18,365	16,640	11.2 km²	1,637/km²
27	Halstenbek	Pinneberg	17,700	16,376	12.6 km²	1,407/km²
28	Bad Segeberg	Segeberg	17,273	16,592	18.9 km²	915.4/km²
29	Stockelsdorf	Ostholstein	17,071	16,517	56.7 km²	301.1/km²
30	Eutin	Ostholstein	16,946	16,449	41.4 km²	409.3/km²
31	Schwarzenbek	Herzogtum Lauenburg	16,374	14,974	11.6 km²	1,416/km²
32	Bargteheide	Stormarn	16,045	15,164	15.8 km²	1,014/km²
33	Preetz	Plön	16,041	15,471	14.4 km²	1,114/km²
34	Ratekau	Ostholstein	15,285	15,217	59.6 km²	256.4/km²
35	Neustadt in Holstein	Ostholstein	15,187	15,024	19.7 km²	769.4/km²
