= Borstel =

Borstel may refer to the following places in Germany:

- Borstel, Lower Saxony, in the district of Diepholz, Lower Saxony
- Borstel (Neustadt am Rübenberge), part of Neustadt am Rübenberge, Lower Saxony
- Borstel, Schleswig-Holstein, in the district of Segeberg, Schleswig-Holstein
- Borstel-Hohenraden, in the district of Pinneberg, Schleswig-Holstein
