= Rantzau (Amt) =

- Amt
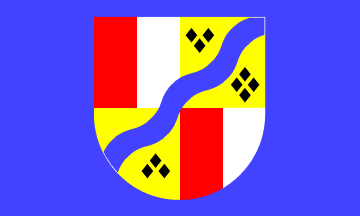
- Flag Coat of arms

- Map of Pinneberg highlighting Rantzau
- Interactive map of Rantzau
- Location within Germany Location within Schleswig-Holstein
- Coordinates: 53°47′N 9°46′E
- Country: Germany
- State: Schleswig-Holstein
- District: Pinneberg
- Seat: Barmstedt
- Subdivisions: 10 municipalities

Government
  - Mayor: Matthias Bagger

Area
  - Total: 112.0 km^{2} (43.2 sq mi)

Population (2025-12-31)
  - Total: 9,257
  - Density: 82.65/km^{2} (214.1/sq mi)
- Time zone: UTC+01:00 (CET)
  - Summer (DST): UTC+02:00 (CEST)
- Website: www.amt-rantzau.de

Rantzau is an Amt ("collective municipality") in the district of Pinneberg, in Schleswig-Holstein, Germany. It is situated around Barmstedt, which is the seat of the Amt, but not part of it. The Amt was named after the County of Rantzau, which existed between 1649 and 1864.

== Subdivision ==
The Amt ("collective municipality") Rantzau consists of the following municipalities:

1. Bevern
2. Bilsen
3. Bokholt-Hanredder
4. Bullenkuhlen
5. Ellerhoop
6. Groß Offenseth-Aspern
7. Heede
8. Hemdingen
9. Langeln
10. Lutzhorn
