= Lutzhorn =

- Municipality
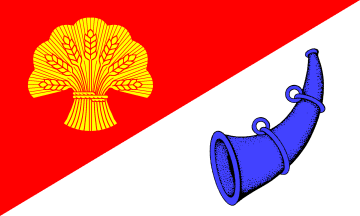
- Flag Coat of arms

- Location of Lutzhorn within Pinneberg district
- Interactive map of Lutzhorn
- Location within Germany Location within Schleswig-Holstein
- Coordinates: 53°49′29″N 9°45′59″E
- Country: Germany
- State: Schleswig-Holstein
- District: Pinneberg
- Municipal assoc.: Rantzau

Government
  - Mayor: Hans-Jürgen Kublun

Area
  - Total: 21.72 km^{2} (8.39 sq mi)
- Elevation: 18 m (59 ft)

Population (2025-12-31)
  - Total: 819
  - Density: 37.7/km^{2} (97.7/sq mi)
- Time zone: UTC+01:00 (CET)
  - Summer (DST): UTC+02:00 (CEST)
- Postal codes: 25355
- Dialling codes: 04123
- Vehicle registration: PI
- Website: www.amt-rantzau.de

Lutzhorn (German pronunciation: [ˈlʊtshɔʁn]) is a small municipality, part of the district of Pinneberg, in Schleswig-Holstein, northern Germany. Three SubCommunities: Im Dorf, Krummendiek and Seis belong to Lutzhorn. Lutzhorn is part of the Amt Rantzau.

== Geography ==
Lutzhorn is located about 4 km north of Barmstedt. Hollenbek, Störbek and Krumm-Bach flow through this community. Parts of the state forest Rantzau belong to Lutzhorn.

== History ==
1255 first mentioned
