= Sethe =

Sethe may refer to:

- Seeth-Ekholt, municipality in Germany
- Kurt Sethe (1869–1934), egyptologist
- Paul Sethe (1901–1967) was a historian and journalist for Frankfurter Allgemeine Zeitung, Der Spiegel, Die Welt, and Die Zeit
- Sethe, the main character in Toni Morrison's 1987 Pulitzer Prize–winning novel Beloved
