= Langeln =

Langeln may refer to the following places in Germany:

- Langeln, Saxony-Anhalt, a village and a former municipality in the district of Harz
- Langeln, Schleswig-Holstein, a municipality in the district of Pinneberg
