= W. Kordes' Söhne =

German rose breeding company

W. Kordes' Söhne (en. W. Kordes' Sons) is a German rose breeding company in Klein Offenseth-Sparrieshoop in Schleswig-Holstein, Germany. The company is one of the world's leading rose breeders and producers for cut roses and garden roses, annually selling worldwide more than two million rose plants at retail and wholesale. Each year, more than 50,000 new crosses of garden roses and cut roses are tested, leading to four to six marketable varieties after a trial period of eight to ten years.

== History ==
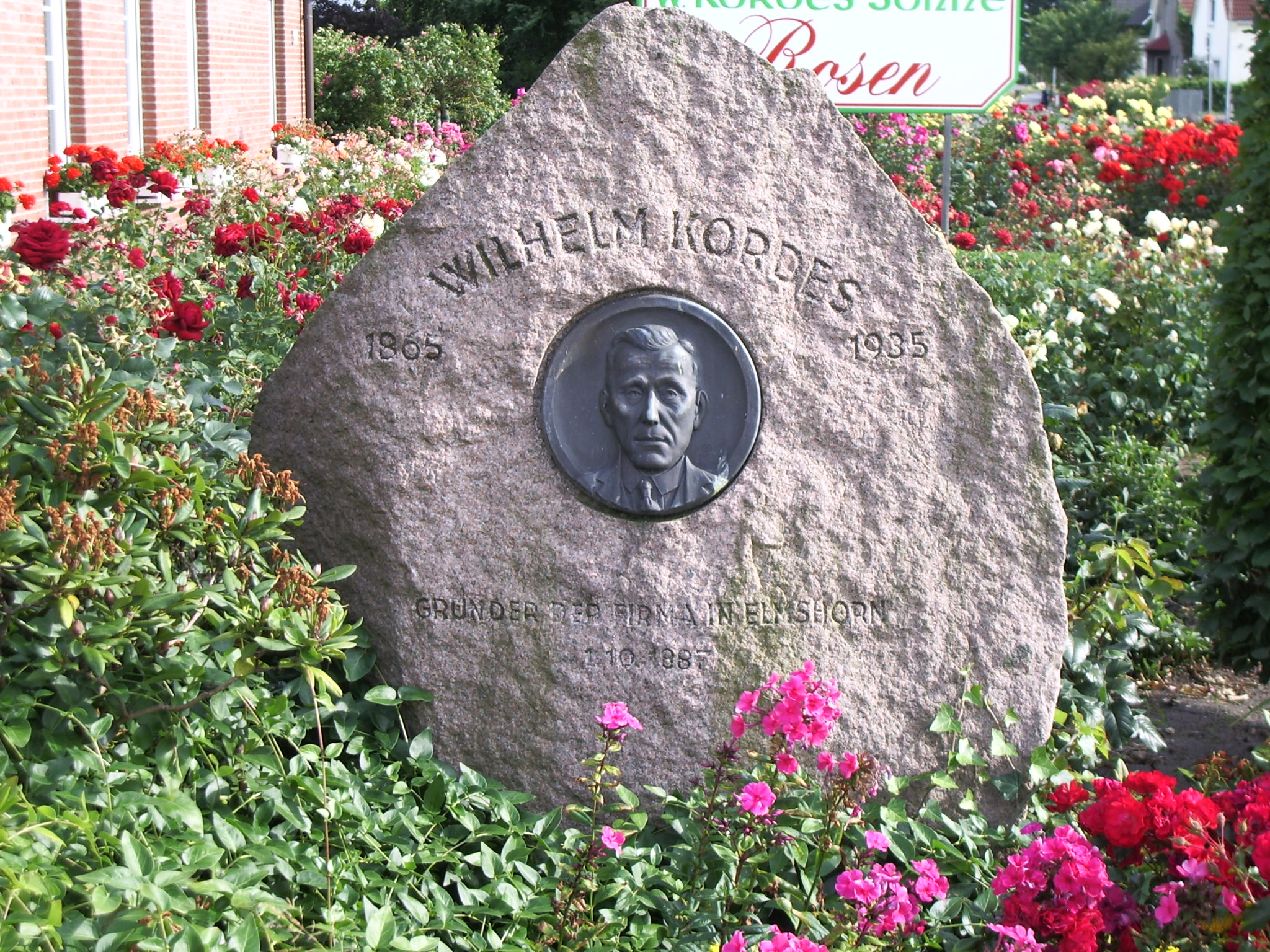
Memorial stone for Wilhelm Kordes in Klein Offenseth-Sparrieshoop

Wilhelm Kordes I (born 1865 in Holstein, Germany, died 1935 in Klein Offenseth-Sparrieshoop) was a German horticulturist. In 1887 he created a rose garden in Elmshorn, specializing in growing garden roses. In 1918 he moved the firm to Klein Offenseth-Sparrieshoop in Schleswig-Holstein.

His sons, the breeder Wilhelm Kordes II (born 30 March 1891 in Elmshorn, died 11 November 1976) and Hermann Kordes (1893-1963) changed the name of the expanding company to "Wilhelm Kordes' Söhne". Wilhelm Kordes II's varieties made them one of the biggest rose firms of the twentieth century. His general aim was to breed hardy and healthy varieties for the German climate. After 1920 he concentrated entirely on rose-growing, leaving management to his brother Hermann. By the mid-1930s, the company had grown to considerable size.

[Wilhelm's] experiments focused at first upon the native European species, including Rosa canina, R. rubiginosa, and R. spinosissima: the results include such important shrub roses as 'Harry Maasz' (1939), 'Louis Rödiger' (1935), 'Raubritter' (1936), 'Karl Föster' (1930), and the early-flowering "Frühling" series. He also experimented with the Hybrid Musks such as 'Elmshorn' (1950), 'Erfurt' (1931), and 'Eva' (1933). [His son Reimer later bred 'Iceberg', also a Hybrid Musk.] Hybrid Teas were not neglected: 'Crimson Glory' (1935) had an unusually long reign as the world's favourite crimson rose.

During the Second World War Wilhelm Kordes II crossed the East Asian Rosa wichurana with the Japanese Rosa rugosa eventually to obtain a new species, Rosa kordesii, able to withstand the harsh winters of north Germany. From it he later bred such famous post-war varieties as 'Parkdirektor Riggers,' 'Leverkusen,' Hamburger Phönix' and 'Heidelberg.' "The dark, glossy foliage of many modern roses can be traced back to 'Kordesii'."

Wilhelm Kordes II was also very involved in implementing ADR testing (general testing of new German roses) in 1950, established by the rose breeders in the Federation of German Nurseries.

Above all, it is as a rose breeder than Wilhelm Kordes [II] will be remembered. He and his son Reimer bred some of the world's best-known roses, including 'Crimson Glory' and 'Schneewittchen' ('Iceberg'). Kordes knew that it was through introducing new genes that all the great advances in plant breeding had been achieved. His experiments focused at first upon the native European species and Rosa rugosa; his aim was to develop new bush roses for small gardens.

From 1955, his son Reimer Kordes (February 19, 1922 – 3 February 1997) ran the company until Reimer's son Wilhelm Kordes III (1953-2016) took over in 1977.

Reimer moved on from shrub roses to concentrate on brilliantly coloured Hybrid Teas and Floribundas for private and public gardens. Nevertheless, he introduced roses of every type: large-flowered climbers such as 'Alchymist' (1956) and 'Antike 89' (1988); ground cover roses such as 'Immensee' and 'Sommerwind'; Hybrid Teas including 'Duftzauber 84' (1984) and 'Kupferkönigin' (1996); shrubs such as 'Chiarivari' (1970), 'Lucinde' (1988), and 'Rosenstadt Zweibrücken' (1989); Floribundas such as 'Golden Holstein' (1988) and 'Crimson Bouquet' (1999); and cut-flower roses such as 'Champagner' (1985).

One of the world's best known rose cultivars, 'Iceberg' (syn. 'Schneewittchen') was introduced by Reimer Kordes in 1958. The variety was selected as the "World Favourite Rose" of 1983. Other famous cultivars include 'Sunsprite', and 'Aprikola'.

== Sortable list of Kordes rose varieties ==
Name	Form	Colour	Date	ADR-recognised	Photo
Adolf Horstmann	hybrid tea	yellow and pink	1971		
Agnes Bernauer	hybrid tea	light pink	1989		
Alchymist	bush	apricot	1956		
Aloha	climber	apricot and pink	2002		
Amadeus	hybrid tea	dark red	2003		
Angela	bush	carmine pink	1984		
Ankori (Angelique)	hybrid tea	orange blend	1980		
Antike 89	floribunda climber	white blend, red edges	1988		
Aprikola	floribunda	yellow-orange to apricot	2001	2001	
Asso di Cuori	hybrid tea	dark red	1981		
Athena	hybrid tea	white blend	1984		
August Kordes (Lafayette)	floribunda	deep pink	1928		
Australian Gold (Mona Lisa)	floribunda	apricot blend	1980		
Ave Maria	hybrid tea	strong salmon-orange	1981		
Bad Birnbach	floribunda, shrub	carmine-pink	2000	2000	
Bad Füssing	floribunda	red	1980		
Bad Neuenahr	bush	mid-red	1958		
Bad Wörishofen (Pink Emely)	floribunda, shrub	carmine pink	2005	2003	
Ballet	hybrid tea	deep pink	1958		
Belami	hybrid tea	orange-pink	1985		
Bella Rosa	floribunda	strong pink	1982		
Bengali	floribunda	orange-red	1966		
Berlin	bush	red	1949		
Berolina	hybrid tea	citron yellow	1986		
Beverly	hybrid tea	light pink	1999		
Black Boy	bush	dark red	1958		
Blue Bayou	floribunda	mauve	1993		
Blue Girl (Kölner Karneval)	hybrid tea	mauve	1964		
Blue River	hybrid tea	mauve	1984		
Blühwunder	floribunda	bright pink to salmon pink	1995	1994	
Bonanza	bush	golden-yellow, copper edges	1983	1984	
Bremer Stadtmusikanten	floribunda	pink blend	2000		
Bride's Dream (Märchenkönigin)	hybrid tea	light pink	1985		
Burghausen	bush	bright crimson	1991	1989	
Caramella	shrub	yellow	2001		
Cervia	floribunda	apricot and pink	2003		
Charmant	dwarf	strong pink	1999	2004	
Cherry Girl	floribunda	red	2007		
Chiarivari	shrub	yellow blend	1971		
Christel von der Post	hybrid tea	deep yellow	1990		
Colour Wonder	hybrid tea	orange-red, cream reverse	1964		
Crimson Bouquet	grandiflora	dark red	1966		
Crimson Glory	hybrid tea	dark red	1935		
Cubana	shrub	apricot blend	2001		
Diamant	floribunda, Shrub	white	2001	2002	
Die Welt	hybrid tea	orange-red	1976		
Doktor Waldheim	hybrid tea	salmon pink	1973		
Dolomiti	floribunda	pink, cream centre	2011		
Dornröschenschloss Sababurg	shrub	pink	1993		
Dortmund	climber	carmine-tinted crimson, white centre	1955	1954	
Duftzauber	hybrid tea	dark red	1984		
Dusterlohe	climber	deep pink	1931		
Eifelzauber	shrub	light pink	2008		
Eliza	hybrid tea	pink to silver-pink	2004	2005	
Elmshorn	bush	cherry red	1951		
Elveshörn	bush	bright red	1985		
Escimo	miniature	bright white	2006	2006	
Esmeralda	hybrid tea	white and pink	1980		
Esprit	floribunda	dark red	1985		
Eva	bush	cherry	1933		
Erfurt	bush	pink, white on a golden base	1939		
Eureka	floribunda	apricot blend	2002		
Eutin	bush	cherry	1940		
Fairest Cape	hybrid tea	apricot, orange shading	1994		
Fantasia Mondiale	hybrid tea	apricot, salmon-pink edges	2006		
Fee des Neiges (Iceberg, Schneewittchen)	floribunda	white	1958		
Felicitas	bush	dark red	1998	1996	
Flammentanz	small shrub	crimson	1955	1952	
Flirt	floribunda shrub	deep pink	2000		
Florentina	hybrid tea	crimson	1973	1974	
Fortuna	floribunda, shrub	dark red	2002	2002	
Fritz Nobis	bush	bright pink	1940		
Frühlingsanfang	bush	bright yellow	1950		
Frühlingsgold	bush	muted yellow	1937		
Frühlingsmorgen	bush	pink-yellow	1931		
Fuggerstadt Augsburg	floribunda	orange-red	1985		
Funkuhr	hybrid tea	yellow, red edges	1984		
Gabriele Gebauer (Sunstar)	floribunda	light yellow	2007		
Garden of Roses	patio shrub	cream, apricot centre	2006		
Gärtnerfreude (Toscana®️)	shrub, floribunda	bright red	2001	2001	
Gartenzauber	floribunda	red	1984		
Gebrüder Grimm	floribunda	orange-red uppers, peach backs	2002	2002	
Gelber Engel	floribunda	bright yellow	2002	2004	
Georgette	floribunda	pink	1995		
Goldbusch	bush	copper	1954		
Golden Gate	climber	bright yellow	2005	2006	
Golden Medaillon	hybrid tea	deep yellow	1991		
Goldener Holstein	floribunda	deep yellow	1988		
Goldmarie	floribunda	deep yellow	1982		
Goldrausch	floribunda	yellow	1961		
Grande Amore	hybrid tea	intense dark red	2004	2005	
Gruss an Bayern	floribunda	red	1971		
Hamburg	bush	dark red	1935		
Hamburger Deern	hybrid tea	orange-pink	1997		
Hamburger Phönix	Kordesii climber	red	1954		
Hannah Gordon (Tabris)	floribunda	white, pink edges	1983		
Hansa Park	shrub	mauve	1994		
Harlekin	climber	cream, red edges	1986		
Harmonie	hybrid tea	orange-pink	1981		
Heidelberg	hybrid tea	carmine-red	1959		
Harry Maasz	hybrid macrantha	crimson-violet, white centre	1939		
Heckenfeuer	floribunda	red	1983		
Heidelinde	floribunda	mauve	1991		
Heinzelmännchen	floribunda	bright crimson	1983		
Helmut Schmidt	hybrid tea	yellow	1979		
Herkules	shrub	white, pink undertones	2007		
Holstein	floribunda	carmine-red	1938		
Ilse Krohn	bush	bright cream and white	1957		
Ilse Krohn superior	bush	bright cream and white	1964		
Innocencia	shrub, floribunda	bright white	2003	2004	
Immensee	shrub	light pink	1982		
Jasmina	climber	violet and pink	1997		
Juanita	shrub	pink, carmine pink	2007	2006	
Karl Förster	bush	white	1931		
Karl Herbst	hybrid tea	carmine red	1950		
Karl Ploberger Rose	shrub	yellow, lighter outer petals	2007		
Kleopatra	hybrid tea	red and yellow	1994		
Knirps	shrub, ground cover	carmine pink	1997	2004	
KO 95/1727-03	shrub	yellow blend	2003		
KO 98 1552-01	floribunda	yellow	1998		
KORblixmu	floribunda	white	2007		
Kordes Brilliant	shrub	orange blend	1983		
Korelasting (Lindenhof)	bush	bright pink, yellow centre	1999		
Korona	floribunda	orange-red	1955		
Kupferkönigin	hybrid tea	deep yellow	1996		
Lady Rose	hybrid tea	orange-pink	1979		
Laguna	hybrid tea	deep pink	1995		
Larissa	shrub	light pink	2007		
Las Vegas	hybrid tea	orange, yellow reverse	1981		
Leverkusen	climber	bright yellow	1954		
Lichtkönigin Lucia	bush	strong lemon-yellow	1966	1968	
Liebeszauber	hybrid tea	dark red	1991		
Lili Marlene	floribunda	dark red	1959		
Lions-Rose	floribunda	cream-white	2002	2002	
Lolita	hybrid tea	apricot blend	1972		
Loving Memory	hybrid tea	red	1981		
Louis Rödiger	climber	pale orange to orange	1935		
Lucinde	shrub	deep yellow	1988		
Lupo	miniature	mauve blend	2006		
Lydia	shrub	orange blend	1973		
Mabella (New Day)	hybrid tea	yellow	1972		
Magenta	bush	mauve	1954		
Maigold	bush	orange	1952		
Mainaufeuer (Red Ribbons)	bush	red	1990		
Mandarin	miniature	apricot blend	1987		
Mandy	hybrid tea	dark red	1987		
Manita	climber	pink, yellow centre	1998	1998	
Mariandel (Christian IV)	floribunda	crimson	1982		
Marondo	shrub	pink	1991		
Maxi Vita	floribunda, shrub	dark pink, yellow-orange base	2001	2001	
Medeo	shrub	white	2001		
Mein schöner Garten	shrub	pink, salmon-pink	1986		
Memoire	hybrid tea	white	1992		
Meteor	floribunda	scarlet	1959	1960	
Mireille Mathieu	floribunda	orange-red	1988		
Mondiale	hybrid tea	old rose pink	1993		
Moonlight	florist's rose	light yellow	2004		
Moon River	shrub	white	1996		
NDR1 Radio Niedersachsen	floribunda	deep pink	1996		
Neon	floribunda, shrub	carmine pink	2001	2001	
Neue Revue	hybrid tea	red blend	1969		
Neues Europa	floribunda	scarlet	1965		
New Day	hybrid tea	butter yellow	1972		
Nicole	floribunda	white, red edges	1985		
Novalis	floribunda	lavender	2010		
Nymphenburg	bush	bright pink	1954		
Out of Rosenheim	floribunda	red	2010		
Palmengarten Frankfurt	shrub	carmine pink	1988	1992	
Parkdirektor Riggers	Kordesii climber	hard red	1957		
Parole	hybrid tea	deep pink	2002		
Peer Gynt	hybrid tea	yellow, red edges	1968		
Perfect Moment	hybrid tea	red, yellow reverse	1989		
Pepita	dwarf	bright carmine pink	2004	2004	
Peter Frankenfeld	hybrid tea	deep pink	1966		
Petticoat	floribunda	white, apricot centre	2004	2004	
Pink Bassino	shrub	pink	1995	1993	
Pink Robusta	shrub	pink	1987		
Planten un Blomen	floribunda	red, pink reverse	1999		
Pomponella	floribunda	deep pink	2005	2006	
Postillion	shrub	copper-yellow	1998		
Prominent	floribunda	orange-red	1971	1971	
Queen Mother	floribunda	light pink	1971	1971	
Queen of Hearts	hybrid tea	orange-pink	2008		
Ramira	climber	pink	1988		
Raubritter	rambler	bright pink	1936		
Raymond Chenault	shrub	red	1960		
Rebell	hybrid tea	red	1996		
Ritter von Barmstede	shrub	pink	1959		
Rosanna	climber	salmon pink	2002		
Rosarium Uetersen	Climber	pink	1977		
Roselina	shrub	deep pink	1992		
Rosenfee	floribunda	light pink	2006		
Rosenprofessor Sieber	floribunda	pink	1997	1996	
Rosenresli	Shrub, bush	salmon-pink	1986	1984	
Rosenstadt Zweibrücken	shrub	pink blend	1989		
Rosenwunder	hybrid rubiginosa	deep pink	1934		
Rosmarin	miniature	deep pink	1989		
Rote Mozart	shrub	orange-red	1989		
Roter Korsar	bush, shrub	dark velvet red	2004		
Rotilla	floribunda	crimson	2000		
Roxy	miniature	violet, red	2007		
Rugelda	bush	lemon yellow	1989		
Saarbrücken	shrub	scarlet	1959		
Salita	climber	orange-red	1987		
Samba	floribunda	red and yellow	1964		
Scharlachglut	gallica	scarlet	1952		
Schwarze Madonna	Kordesii hybrid tea	dark red	1992		
Schwarzer Samt	Kordesii climber	dark red	1969		
Sebastian Kneipp	hybrijd tea	white	1997		
Shocking Blue	floribunda	mauve blend	1985		
Smart Roadrunner	hybrid rugosa	deep pink	2002		
Solero	hybrid tea	deep yellow	2005		
Sommerabend	shrub, ground cover	bright red	1995	1996	
Sommermorgen	shrub	light pink	1983		
Sommerwind	ground cover, floribunda	pure pink	1985	1987	
Sonnenröschen	dwarf, ground cover	white, yellow eye	2005	2003	
Sparrieshoop	bush	pink	1953		
Späths Jubiläum	floribunda	orange	1953		
Speelwark	hybrid tea	yellow and pink	1999		
St. Pauli		pink-yellow	1958		
Sterntaler	hybrid tea	yellow	1995		
Sunny Rose	shrub, ground cover	bright yellow, light yellow	2001	2004	
Sunsprite (Friesia)	floribunda	deep yellow	1973		
Sylt	Kordesii hybrid	dark red	1980		
Sylvia	hybrid tea	pink	1978	1977	
Sympathie	Kordesii climber	deep scarlet	1964	1966	
Tatjana	hybrid tea	dark red	1970		
Tradition	climber	red	1995		
Träumerei	bush	lobster and salmon orange	1974		
UNICEF-Rose	floribunda, shrub	bright pink	2007	2005	
Uetersens Rosenkönigin	bush	orange to mid-red	2009		
Uetersens Rosenprinzessin	bush	light pink	2009		
Valencia	hybrid tea	amber-yellow	1989		
Vogelpark Walsrode	bush	light pink	1988	1989	
Walter Schultheis					
Wedding Bells	hybrid tea	pink	2010		
Weisse Immensee	shrub	white	1982		
Weisse Wolke	climber	white	1998		
Westerland	bush	orange to apricot	1969	1974	
Wilhelm	climber	dark red	1934		
Wilhelm Hansmann	Kordesii shrub	dark red	1955		
Winter Sun	hybrid tea	yellow	2010		
Yankee Doodle	hybrid tea	yellow blend	1965		
Zaide	shrub	pink	2006		
Zitronenjette	hybrid tea	yellow	1964		
Zwergenfee	miniature	red orange	1978		
Zwergkönigin	miniature	pink	1979		

== Bibliography ==
- W. Kordes Söhne The Kordes firm's website in English
