= Kölln-Reisiek =

- Municipality
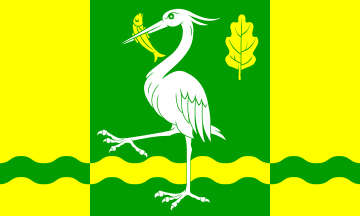
- Flag Coat of arms

- Location of Kölln-Reisiek within Pinneberg district
- Interactive map of Kölln-Reisiek
- Location within Germany Location within Schleswig-Holstein
- Coordinates: 53°45′32″N 9°41′51″E
- Country: Germany
- State: Schleswig-Holstein
- District: Pinneberg
- Municipal assoc.: Elmshorn-Land

Government
  - Mayor: Kerstin Frings-Kippenberg (SPD)

Area
  - Total: 6.77 km^{2} (2.61 sq mi)
- Elevation: 7 m (23 ft)

Population (2025-12-31)
  - Total: 3,400
  - Density: 500/km^{2} (1,300/sq mi)
- Time zone: UTC+01:00 (CET)
  - Summer (DST): UTC+02:00 (CEST)
- Postal codes: 25337
- Dialling codes: 04121
- Vehicle registration: PI
- Website: www.elmshorn-land.de

Kölln-Reisiek (German pronunciation: [ˈkœln ˈʁaɪziːk]) is a municipality in the district of Pinneberg, in Schleswig-Holstein, Germany.
