= Rosa 'KORbin' =

Rose cultivar

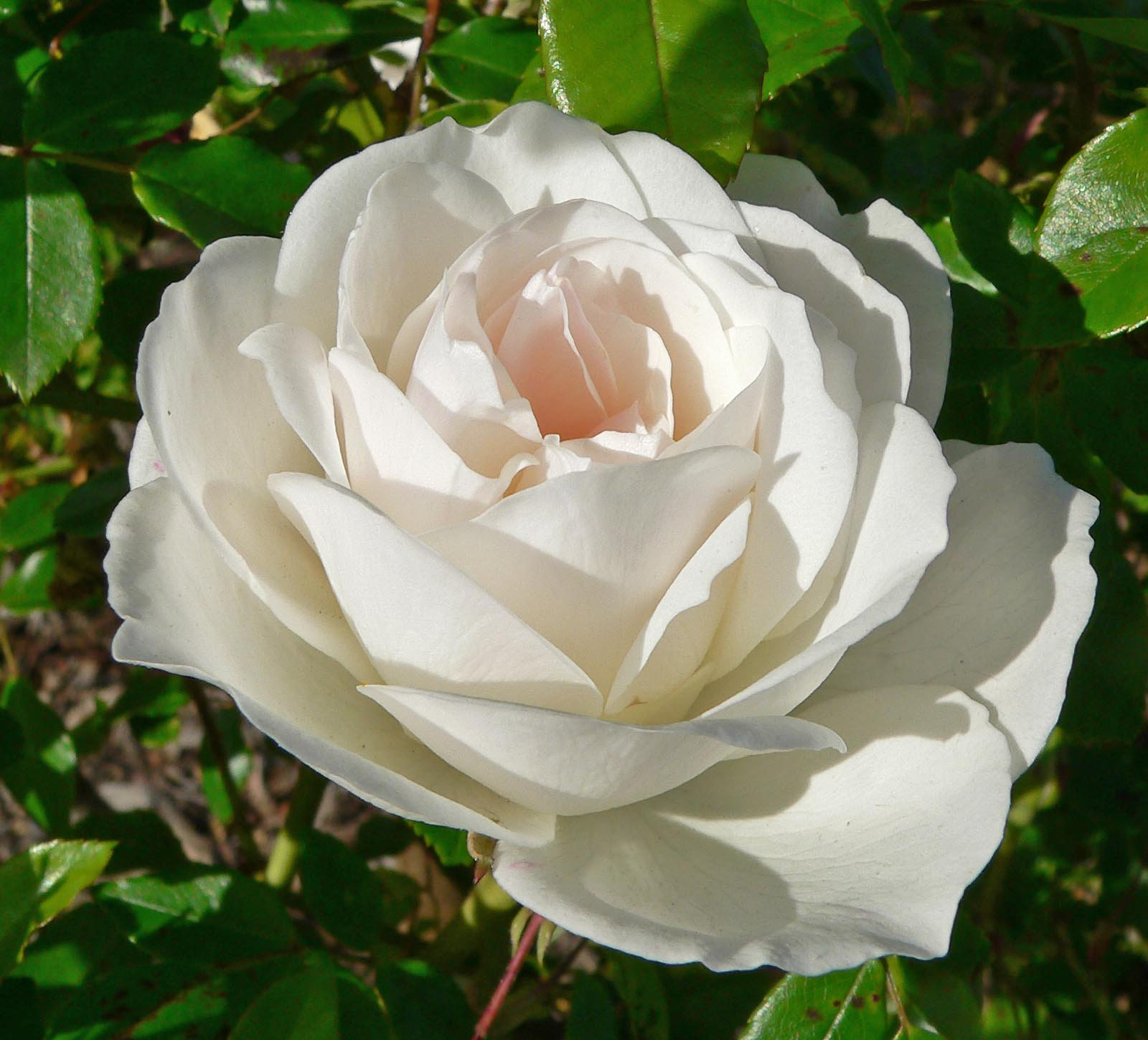
- Genus: Rosa hybrid
- Hybrid parentage: 'Robin Hood' x 'Virgo'
- Cultivar group: Floribunda
- Cultivar: Rosa 'KORbin'
- Marketing names: Iceberg, Fée des Neiges, Schneewittchen
- Origin: Bred by W. Kordes & Sons, Germany, 1958.

Rosa 'KORbin' is a white floribunda rose cultivar bred by Kordes in Germany in 1958. It is also known as Iceberg, Fée des Neiges and Schneewittchen. 'KORbin' is among the world's best known roses.

== Description ==
'KORbin' is a modern cluster-flowered floribunda rose cultivar. It is commercially available in two main forms: a bush and a standard, both produced by a form of grafting known as budding. The size and shape of bush forms depend on growing conditions and pruning regime: it is usually about 1.2 metres (3.9 ft) high and 1 metre (3.3 ft) wide, though in hot climates it can reach 2 metres (6.6 ft) high and if lightly pruned can become a graceful shrub. Leaves are small, light green and glossy. Blooms are about 5 cm in diameter and have 25 to 35 petals. They grow in clusters on long stems. Buds are long and pointed. The fragrant flowers usually appear abundantly throughout the year.

== Origin ==
The cultivar was developed by prolific German rose breeder Reimer Kordes in Germany in 1958. He and his father Wilhelm had initially specialised in developing bush roses that were suitable for small gardens. The parent varieties of 'KORbin' are 'Robin Hood', a red hybrid musk rose, developed by Joseph Pemberton in 1927 in England, and 'Virgo', a white hybrid-tea rose bred in France by Charles Mallerin in 1927.

The plant was registered under the cultivar name 'KORbin' by Kordes in 1958 and given the trade name Schneewittchen. The cultivar is known as Fée des Neiges in French and Iceberg in English.

== Awards and recognition ==
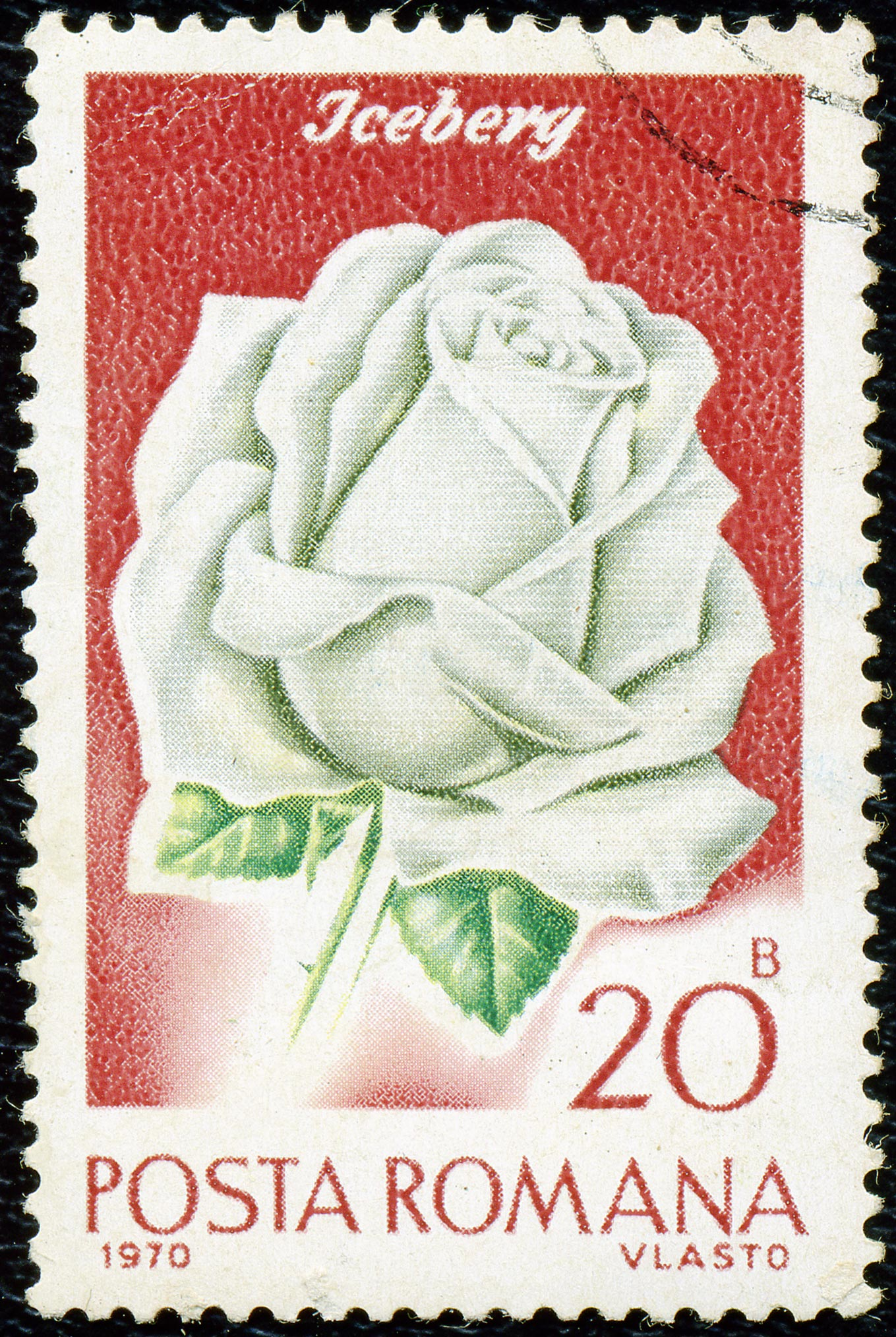
Iceberg depicted on a 1970 Romanian stamp

In 1958, 'KORbin' was awarded a Royal National Rose Society Gold Medal. The cultivar was selected as the "World Favourite Rose" of 1983 by the World Federation of Rose Societies and is listed in their "Rose Hall of Fame". The German ADR title granted in 1960 was taken away in 2004.

Stamps depicting the cultivar were issued in Romania in 1970 and New Zealand in 1975.

== Related cultivars ==
A number of sports of 'KORbin' have been discovered:

- 'Blushing Pink 'KORbin'' – A cultivar originating from Lilia Weatherly's garden in Tasmania in 1994 with white flowers flushed with pale pink.
- 'Brilliant Pink 'KORbin'' – a deep pink form from the same garden in Tasmania.
- 'Burgundy 'KORbin'' – a sport of 'Brilliant Pink Iceberg' with prolific burgundy flowers.
- 'Climbing 'KORbin'' – a climbing form discovered by Cants of Colchester in England in 1968 and available as weeping and climbing forms of 'KORbin'.

Because of its positive qualities, 'KORbin' was an important parent of the English Roses bred by David Austin and others: 1983 – 'Graham Thomas' and 'Perdita'; 1984 – 'Belle Story', 'Dove' and 'Heritage'; 1985 – 'Emanuel'; 1986 – 'Claire Rose', 'English Garden' and 'Swan'.

== Cultivation ==
Although plants are generally disease free, they may suffer from black spot in more humid climates or in situations where air circulation is limited. Plants tolerate shade, though they perform best in full sun. In North America they are able to be grown in USDA Hardiness Zones 4b and higher. In Australia, plants are suited to all but northern tropical areas. The hardiness and popularity of the cultivar have seen its widespread use in cultivation across the world, occasionally leading to claims that it is "overdone" as a garden plant.

The blooms are suited for use as cut flowers. Both the shrub form and grafted standard may be grown in large containers. Iceberg rose is a prolific bloomer even in hot regions like Lahore.
