= Raa-Besenbek =

- Municipality
- Coat of arms

- Location of Raa-Besenbek within Pinneberg district
- Interactive map of Raa-Besenbek
- Location within Germany Location within Schleswig-Holstein
- Coordinates: 53°46′N 9°36′E
- Country: Germany
- State: Schleswig-Holstein
- District: Pinneberg
- Municipal assoc.: Elmshorn-Land

Government
  - Mayor: Norman Sternberg (CDU)

Area
  - Total: 12.99 km^{2} (5.02 sq mi)
- Elevation: 1 m (3.3 ft)

Population (2025-12-31)
  - Total: 582
  - Density: 44.8/km^{2} (116/sq mi)
- Time zone: UTC+01:00 (CET)
  - Summer (DST): UTC+02:00 (CEST)
- Postal codes: 25335
- Dialling codes: 04121
- Vehicle registration: PI
- Website: www.raa-besenbek.de

Raa-Besenbek (German pronunciation: [ˈʁaː ˈbeːzn̩beːk]) is a municipality in the district of Pinneberg, in Schleswig-Holstein, Germany.
