= Heede, Schleswig-Holstein =

Heede
- Municipality
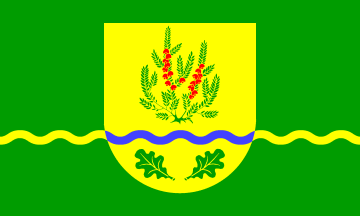
- Flag Coat of arms

- Location of Heede within Pinneberg district
- Interactive map of Heede
- Location within Germany Location within Schleswig-Holstein
- Coordinates: 53°47′1″N 9°48′14″E
- Country: Germany
- State: Schleswig-Holstein
- District: Pinneberg
- Municipal assoc.: Rantzau

Government
  - Mayor: Reimer Offermann

Area
  - Total: 15.48 km^{2} (5.98 sq mi)
- Elevation: 18 m (59 ft)

Population (2025-12-31)
  - Total: 837
  - Density: 54.1/km^{2} (140/sq mi)
- Time zone: UTC+01:00 (CET)
  - Summer (DST): UTC+02:00 (CEST)
- Postal codes: 25355
- Dialling codes: 04123
- Vehicle registration: PI
- Website: www.gemeinde-heede.de

Heede (German pronunciation: [ˈheːdə]) is a municipality in the district of Pinneberg, in Schleswig-Holstein, Germany.
