= Ellerhoop-Thiensen Arboretum =

Arboretum and botanical garden in Schleswig-Holstein, Germany

Coordinates: 53°43′02″N 9°46′35″E

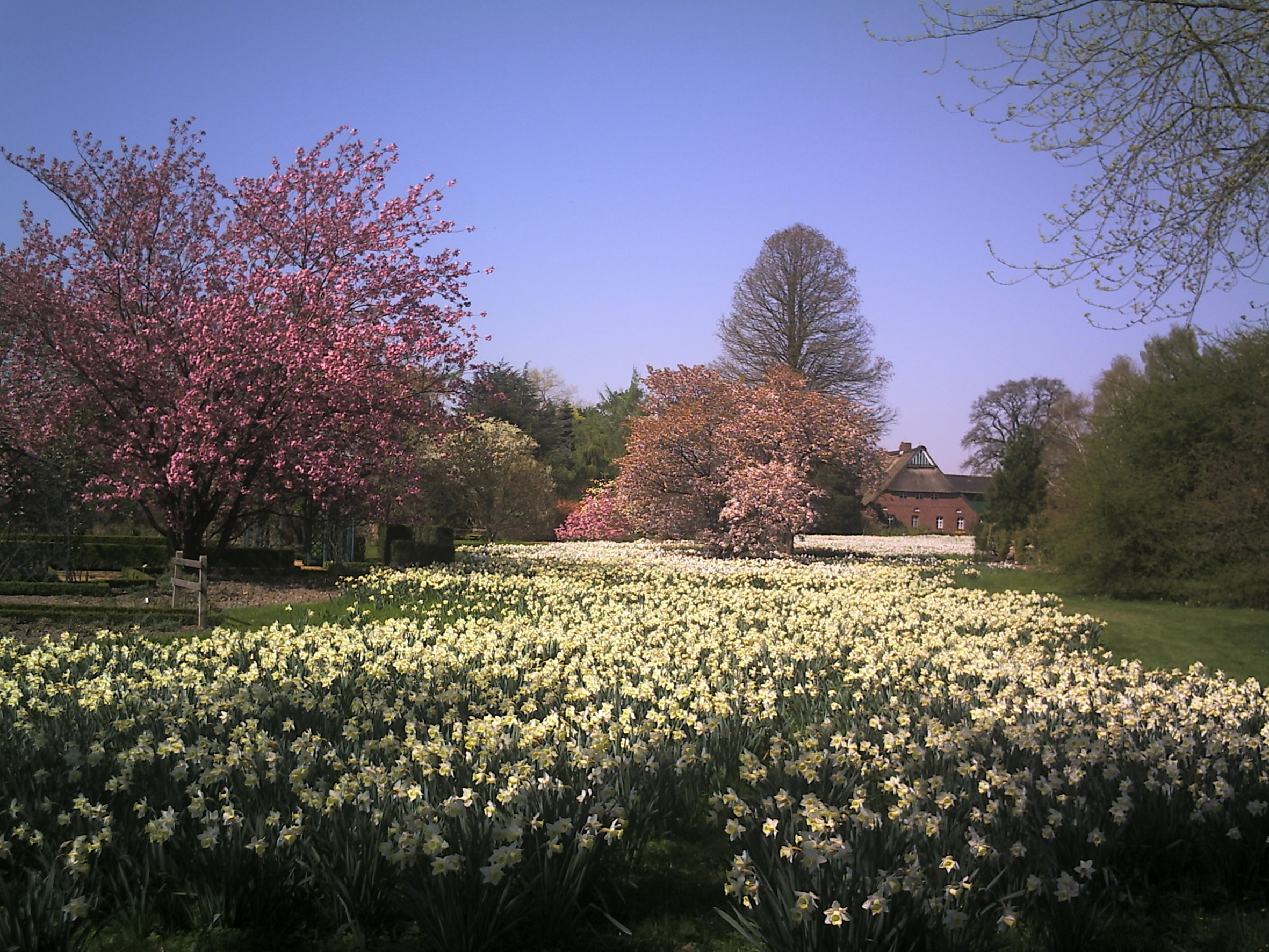
Arboretum Ellerhoop-Thiensen

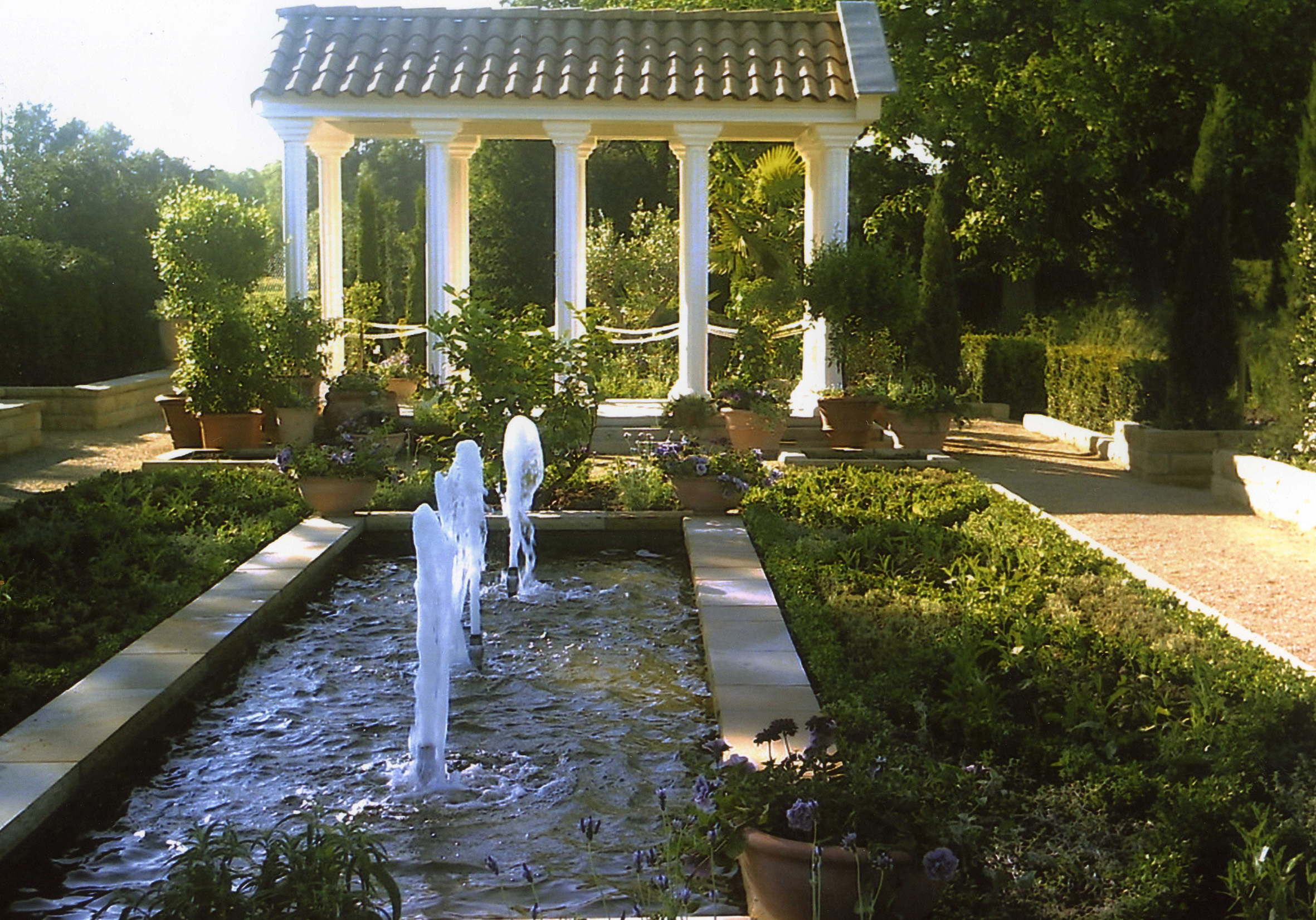
Italian garden

The Ellerhoop-Thiensen Arboretum (17 hectares, of which about 7.5 hectares are open to the public) is an arboretum and botanical garden located at Thiensen 4, Ellerhoop, Schleswig-Holstein, Germany. It is open daily; an admission fee is charged.

The arboretum dates to 1943 when Timm & Co. formed a nursery on the site. In 1956 its last owner, Erich Frahm, established an arboretum (3.5 hectares) in cooperation with dendrologist Dr. Gerd Krüssman. In 1980 the site was acquired by the state, along with 10 hectares for expansion, and a group including the Botanical Garden of the University of Hamburg helped plan its future. In 1989 the non-profit Arboretum Förderkreis Baumbark Ellerhoop-Thiensen eV was established to support the arboretum, and in 1996 responsibility was handed to this organization.

Today the arboretum serves to help teach practical and theoretical biology, including both training in horticulture and academic botanical research. Its areas include:

- The development history of the trees dating to the Carboniferous period,
- A herbivorous dinosaur from the Triassic period,
- A large cypress swamp forest of the Tertiary period,
- A crop area with heritage grains,
- Other topics such as carnivorous plants.

The arboretum's main focus is on the genera Prunus, Malus, and Hydrangea. Tree specimens include Acer rubrum, Aronia arbutifolia, Cephalanthus occidentalis, Chamaecyparis thyoides, Ilex glabra, Magnolia virginiana, and Taxodium distichum. It also includes various bamboo species (Phyllostachys, Fargesia, Pseudosasa, and Sasa), as well as Alnus glutinosa 'Imperialis', various Salix species, and Miscanthus varieties.

A secondary research focus is the breeding and selection of tree peonies. In recent years, the arboretum has amassed the largest tree peony collection in Germany, with a total of 245 taxa.

== See also ==
- List of botanical gardens in Germany
