= Westerhorn =

- Municipality
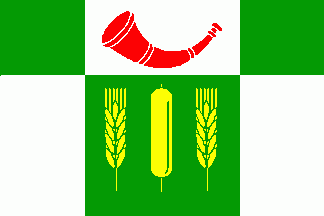
- Flag Coat of arms

- Location of Westerhorn within Pinneberg district
- Interactive map of Westerhorn
- Location within Germany Location within Schleswig-Holstein
- Coordinates: 53°51′9″N 9°40′47″E
- Country: Germany
- State: Schleswig-Holstein
- District: Pinneberg
- Municipal assoc.: Hörnerkirchen

Government
  - Mayor: Bernd Reimers (CDU)

Area
  - Total: 9.37 km^{2} (3.62 sq mi)
- Elevation: 7 m (23 ft)

Population (2025-12-31)
  - Total: 1,307
  - Density: 139/km^{2} (361/sq mi)
- Time zone: UTC+01:00 (CET)
  - Summer (DST): UTC+02:00 (CEST)
- Postal codes: 25364
- Dialling codes: 04127
- Vehicle registration: PI
- Website: www.amt- hoernerkirchen.de

Westerhorn (German pronunciation: [ˈvɛstɐhɔʁn]) is a municipality in the district of Pinneberg, in Schleswig-Holstein, Germany.
