= Hemdingen =

- Municipality
- Coat of arms

- Location of Hemdingen within Pinneberg district
- Interactive map of Hemdingen
- Location within Germany Location within Schleswig-Holstein
- Coordinates: 53°45′54″N 9°50′19″E
- Country: Germany
- State: Schleswig-Holstein
- District: Pinneberg
- Municipal assoc.: Rantzau

Government
  - Mayor: Bernd Sommer

Area
  - Total: 16.42 km^{2} (6.34 sq mi)
- Elevation: 21 m (69 ft)

Population (2025-12-31)
  - Total: 1,794
  - Density: 109.3/km^{2} (283.0/sq mi)
- Time zone: UTC+01:00 (CET)
  - Summer (DST): UTC+02:00 (CEST)
- Postal codes: 25485
- Dialling codes: 04106, 04120, 04123, 04127
- Vehicle registration: PI
- Website: www.hemdingen.de

Hemdingen is a municipality in the district of Pinneberg, in Schleswig-Holstein, Germany.
