= Rosa 'Sunsprite' =

Rose cultivar

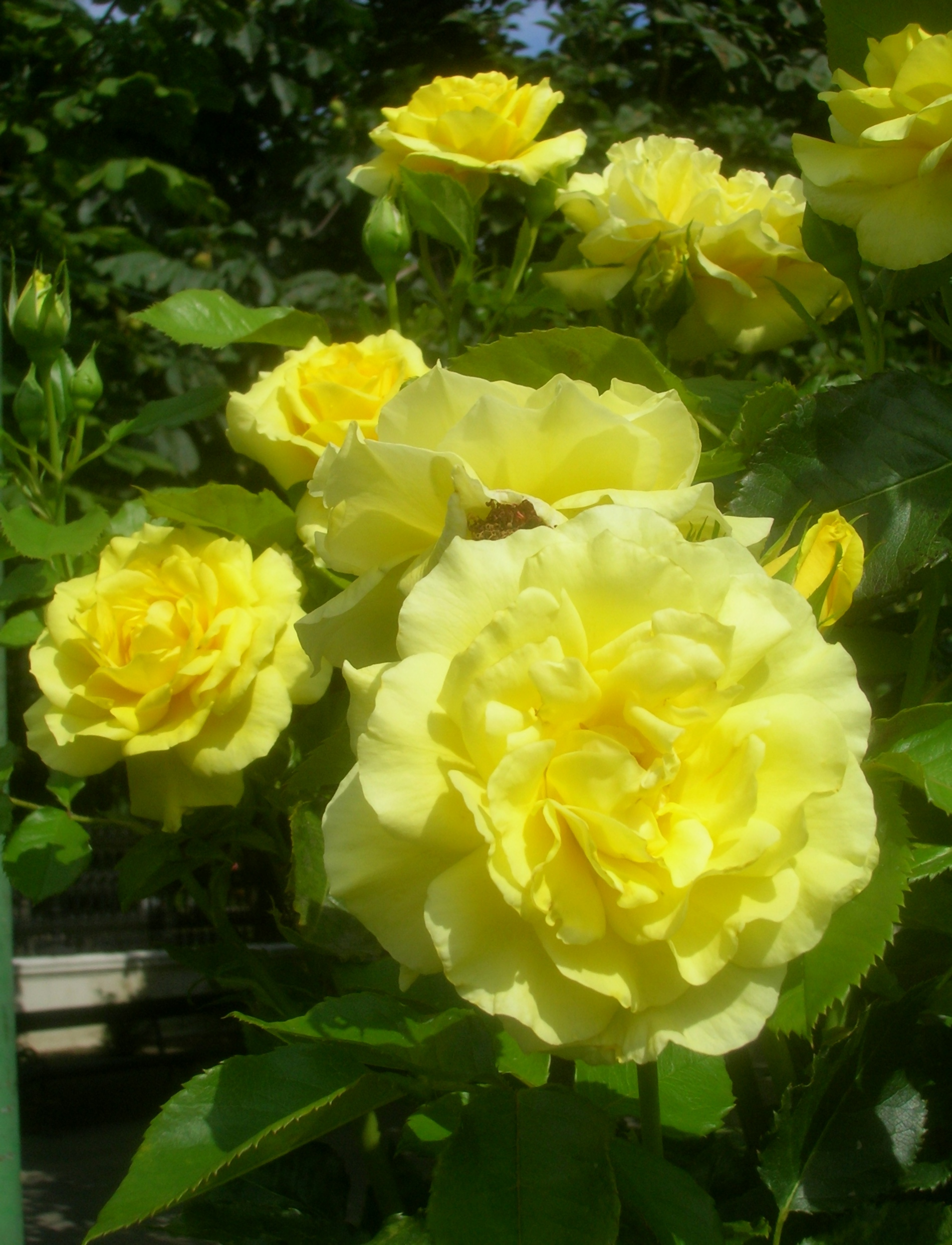
- Genus: Rosa hybrid
- Hybrid parentage: 'Friedrich Wörlein' × 'Spanish Sun'
- Cultivar group: Floribunda
- Cultivar: Rosa 'Sunsprite'
- Marketing names: 'KORresia', 'Friesia'
- Origin: Reimer Kordes, 1973 (Germany)

Rosa 'Sunsprite' (syn. 'KORresia', 'Friesia') is a rose variety developed by Reimer Kordes and introduced in 1973. The rose was derived from the cultivars 'Friedrich Wörlein' × 'Spanish Sun', and is one of the most successful floribunda roses. It was named 'Friesia' after the region Frisia (Friesland), the home of the breeder, and was one of the first roses to be given a code name ('KORresia' for Kordes).

Its sunny yellow blooms are large and flat with 17 to 25 waved petals, reaching an average diameter of 8 cm (3.2 in) and have a very strong fragrance. The high-centered flowers appear solitary or in small clusters in a blooming period lasting from June to September. Their bright yellow colour hardly changes with age. The flower is not well suited as a cut flower as it has short stems and only lasts for a short period of time after cutting.

The plant has light-green, glossy leaves, forms upright, bushy shrubs with about 40 to 75 cm height and up to 60 cm width, is very disease resistant and hardy (USDA zone 6b) and can be grown on the ground or in containers.

It is used as a parent rose, leading to cultivars such as Rosa 'Sun Flare' (Warriner, 1981) and 'Morden Sunrise' (Davidson & Collicutt, 1991).

== Awards ==
'Sunsprite' has won several awards, amongst others, it is the only floribunda to receive the Gamble Award for Fragrance (1979).

- Baden Baden Gold Medal 1972
- ADR-Rose 1973 (detracted)
- James Alexander Gamble Fragrance Award 1979
- James Mason Memorial Medal 1989
- RNRS Gold Medal 1989
