= Osterhorn =

- Municipality
- Coat of arms

- Location of Osterhorn within Pinneberg district
- Interactive map of Osterhorn
- Location within Germany Location within Schleswig-Holstein
- Coordinates: 53°52′9″N 9°41′53″E
- Country: Germany
- State: Schleswig-Holstein
- District: Pinneberg
- Municipal assoc.: Hörnerkirchen

Government
  - Mayor: Ralf Henning

Area
  - Total: 6.38 km^{2} (2.46 sq mi)
- Elevation: 9 m (30 ft)

Population (2025-12-31)
  - Total: 405
  - Density: 63.5/km^{2} (164/sq mi)
- Time zone: UTC+01:00 (CET)
  - Summer (DST): UTC+02:00 (CEST)
- Postal codes: 25364
- Dialling codes: 04127
- Vehicle registration: PI
- Website: www.amt- hoernerkirchen.de

Osterhorn (German pronunciation: [ˈoːstɐhɔʁn]) is a municipality in the district of Pinneberg, in Schleswig-Holstein, Germany.
