= Johann Hinrich Klapmeyer =

German organ builder (c.1690–1757)

Johann Hinrich Klapmeyer (ca. 1690 – 23 November 1757) was a German organ builder.

== Life ==
Born in Krempe, Klapmeyer presumably learned the trade from his father Johann (Jean) Werner Klapmeyer, who had been a journeyman with Arp Schnitger and was involved, among other things, in the construction of the organ in Wittmund. In 1729, he acquired the citizenship of Glückstadt and worked there as an organ and instrument maker On the side, he ran a hostelry with an inn. From 1733 onwards, he was in conflict with his competitors Lambert Daniel Kastens and Johann Dietrich Busch, who ran a workshop in Itzehoe. After petitioning the Danish king five times, Klapmeyer received the longed-for organ building concession for life for the area of Schleswig-Holstein in 1735. In the last years of his life he was in poor health and worked in his inn. His journeyman Johann Joachim Maaß took over the organ work. After Klapmeyer's death in 1758, the privilege was transferred to his widow, who commissioned Maaß with the work. In 1763, Maaß received the privilege from her.

A descendant that bore his name, Johann Hinrich Klapmeyer (1724–1792), possibly a grandson, was based in Oldenburg (Lower Saxony) and built and repaired instruments in the Orgellandschaft Oldenburg and the Orgellandschaft zwischen Elbe und Weser.

== List of work ==
Year	Location	Church	Picture	Manual	Stops	Notes
1719–1720	Barmstedt	Heiligen-Geist-Kirche		III/P	31	New organ; restored by Alfred Führer in 1990
1721	Herzhorn	St. Annen				New organ
1724	Bützfleth	St.-Nicolai-Kirche		II/P	22	Repair of the organ by Johann Werner Klapmeyer (1703–1705); only the casing has been preserved.
1726	Oederquart	St. Johannis		III/p	28	Repair of the organ by Arp Schnitger (1678–1682)
1727–1730	Altenbruch	St.-Nicolai-Kirche		III/P	35	Conversion and rebuilding of the organ from the 15th–17th centuries, 9 stops by Klapmeyer (completely or partially) preserved. → Organ of St. Nicholas' Church, Altenbruch
1735	Wyk auf Föhr	St. Nicolai (Wyk auf Föhr)		I/P	?	New construction of a single-manual organ with pedal towers; rebuilt in 1955/1956 by Rudolf von Beckerath Orgelbau, during which the previous manual structure became the Rückpositiv and a new main organ was added (II/P/25); some stops preserved
1736–1738	Wesselburen	St. Bartholomäus		II/P	31	New building; facade and some stops preserved; remaining pipework reconstructed by Rowan West.
1734–1738	Neuenkirchen (Dithmarschen)	St. Jacobi		II/P	25	New building; replaced in 1884–1885 by Johann Färber and Rückpositiv removed; façade partially preserved.
1738–1740	Kotzenbüll	Nikolaikirche		I/P	15	Repair and extension of the organ from about 1550 (9 stops) by an independent pedal (6 stops); after later alterations and renovations (1848, 1859 (by Johann Hinrich Färber (including a neo-Gothic facade)), 1958), 6 stops of the 16th century and 4 pedal stops by Klapmeyer are still preserved..
