= Rosa 'Sun Flare' =

Yellow floribunda rose cultivar

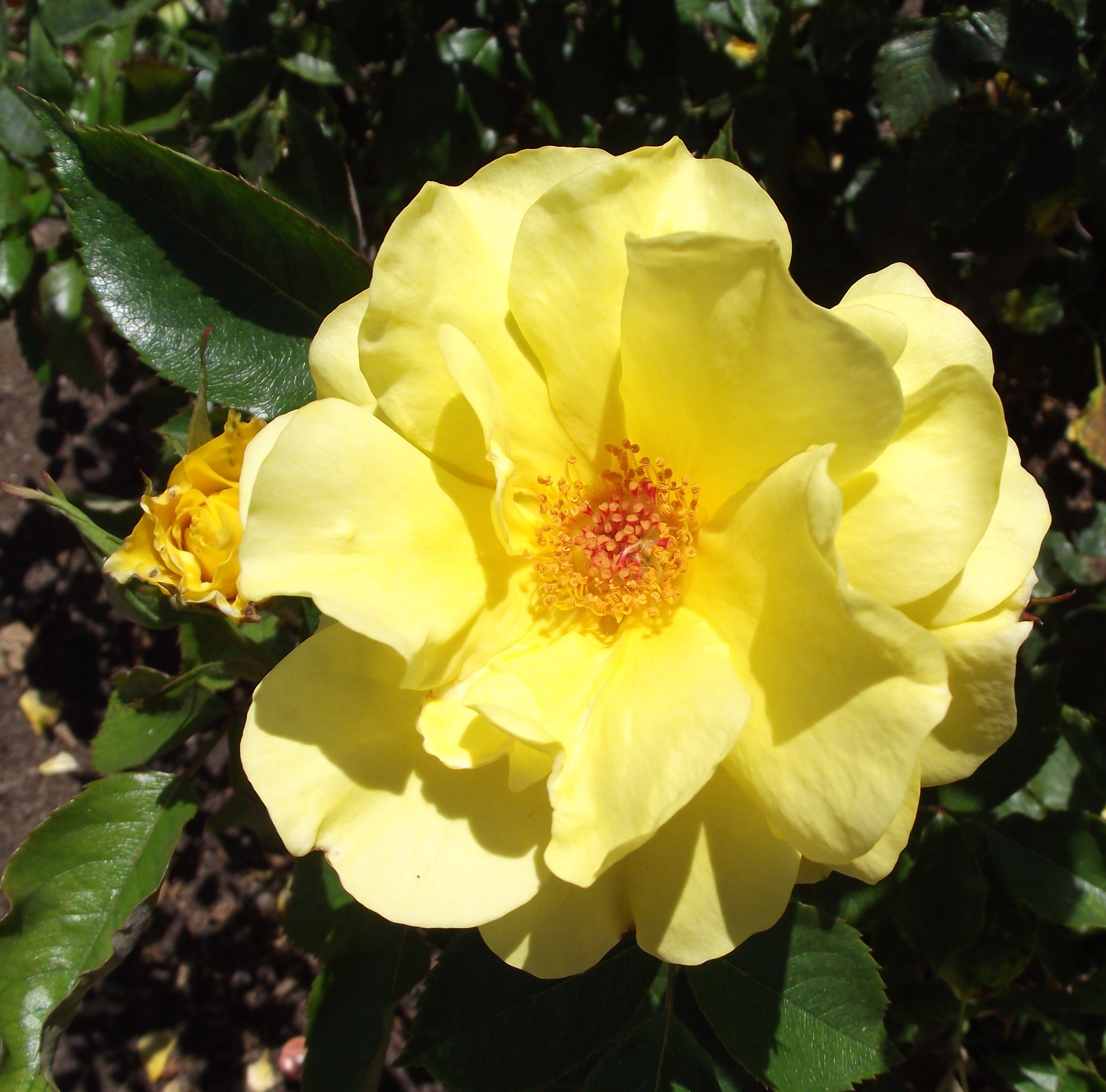
- Genus: Rosa hybrid
- Hybrid parentage: 'Sunsprite' x Unnamed seedling
- Cultivar group: Floribunda
- Cultivar: JACjem
- Marketing names: 'Sunflare', 'Sun Flare', 'JACjem'
- Origin: William A. Warriner, United States, 1981.

Rosa 'Sun Flare', (a.k.a. JACjem), is a yellow floribunda rose cultivar, bred by William Warriner and introduced into United States by Jackson & Perkins in 1981. The rose won a gold medal in Japan in 1981, Portland in 1982 and was named an All-America Rose Selections winner in 1983.

== Description ==
'Sun Flare' is a short bushy shrub, 3 to 4 ft (90–120 cm) in height with a 3 ft (90 cm) spread. Flowers are slightly double (17-25 petals), and bloom in small clusters. Buds are pointed. The bright yellow double flowers reach 9 cm in diameter and appear in clusters of 3 to 20 in flushes throughout the flowering season. The lemon-yellow colour hardly fades with age even in hot climates, a problem many other yellow cultivars have. The ruffled flowers develop from pointed buds and have a mild licorice fragrance. 'Sun Flare' sometimes has rose hips. The plant has reddish prickles and medium, glossy, dark green foliage. The plant thrives in USDA zone 6b and warmer and blooms in flushes from spring to fall. It is winter hardy up to −23 °C (USDA zone 6) and very disease resistant.

== Sports and child plants ==
- Rosa 'Bill Warriner', (1988), 'Sun Flare' x 'Impatient'
- Rosa 'Eureka', (2003), 'Berstein-rose' x 'Sun Flare'
- Rosa 'First Kiss', (1991), 'Sun Flare' x 'Simplicity'
- Rosa 'Flirtatious', (2002), 'Sun Flare' x "Peppermint Twist'
- Rosa 'Grand Prize', (1986), 'Sun Flare' x 'Impatient'
- 'Sun Flare CL', (1987) Sport

== Awards ==
'Sun Flare' has won several awards, including gold medals in Japan (1981) and Portland (1986) and being included into the All-America Rose Selections in 1983.

== See also ==
- Garden roses
- Rose Hall of Fame
- List of Award of Garden Merit roses
