= Ellerhoop =

German municipality twinned with Hurst Green, UK

- Municipality
- Coat of arms

- Location of Ellerhoop within Pinneberg district
- Interactive map of Ellerhoop
- Location within Germany Location within Schleswig-Holstein
- Coordinates: 53°43′39″N 9°46′14″E
- Country: Germany
- State: Schleswig-Holstein
- District: Pinneberg
- Municipal assoc.: Rantzau

Government
  - Mayor: Wiebke Uhl (CDU)

Area
  - Total: 10.79 km^{2} (4.17 sq mi)
- Elevation: 11 m (36 ft)

Population (2025-12-31)
  - Total: 1,536
  - Density: 142.4/km^{2} (368.7/sq mi)
- Time zone: UTC+01:00 (CET)
  - Summer (DST): UTC+02:00 (CEST)
- Postal codes: 25373
- Dialling codes: 04120
- Vehicle registration: PI
- Website: www.ellerhoop.de

Ellerhoop (German pronunciation: [ˈɛlɐhoːp]) is a municipality in the district of Pinneberg in Schleswig Holstein, Germany. It is twinned with the village of Hurst Green, East Sussex, UK.

== Geography ==
Ellerhoop is situated to the north of Hamburg, close to the A23 Autobahn.

== Points of interest ==
- Arboretum Ellerhoop-Thiensen
