= Tangstedt, Pinneberg =

Tangstedt
- Municipality
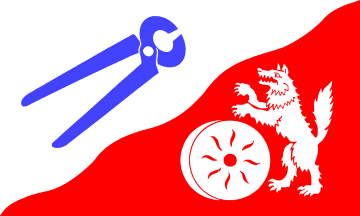
- Flag Coat of arms

- Location of Tangstedt within Pinneberg district
- Interactive map of Tangstedt
- Location within Germany Location within Schleswig-Holstein
- Coordinates: 53°40′N 9°51′E
- Country: Germany
- State: Schleswig-Holstein
- District: Pinneberg
- Municipal assoc.: Pinnau

Government
  - Mayor: Henriette Krohn (CDU)

Area
  - Total: 12.52 km^{2} (4.83 sq mi)
- Elevation: 7 m (23 ft)

Population (2025-12-31)
  - Total: 2,274
  - Density: 181.6/km^{2} (470.4/sq mi)
- Time zone: UTC+01:00 (CET)
  - Summer (DST): UTC+02:00 (CEST)
- Postal codes: 25499
- Dialling codes: 04101
- Vehicle registration: PI
- Website: www.amt-pinnau.de

Tangstedt (German pronunciation: [ˈtaŋʃtɛt]) is a municipality in the district of Pinneberg, in Schleswig-Holstein, Germany.
