= Rosa 'Harlekin' =

Climbing rose cultivar

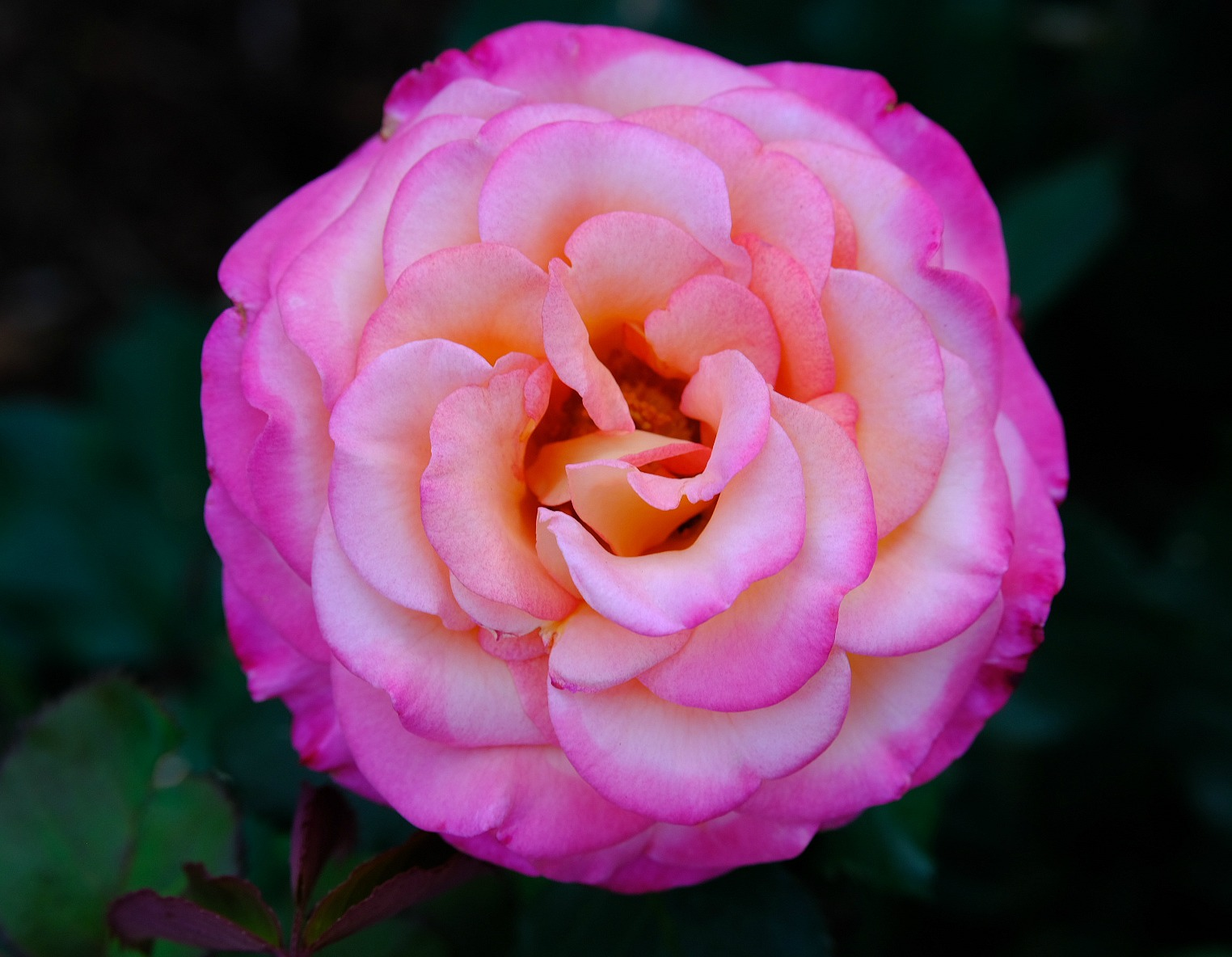
- Rosa 'Harlekin'
- Genus: Rosa hybrid
- Cultivar group: Modern climber
- Cultivar: KORlupo
- Marketing names: 'Harlekin' 'Arlequin' 'Kiss of Desire' 'Harlequin'
- Breeder: Reimer Kordes
- Origin: Germany, (1986)

Rosa 'Harlekin', (aka KORlupo), is a modern climbing rose cultivar, bred by Reimer Kordes in Germany in 1986. It is considered to be the best of the bicolored modern climbing roses. It blooms continuously throughout the growing season.

== Description ==
'Harlekin' is a tall, bushy climbing rose, 8 to 12 ft (250—365 cm) in height with a 3 to 4 ft (90—121 cm) spread. Blooms are 3.5 in (8.9 cm) in diameter, with 26 to 40 petals. Flowers have a high-centered, cupped form, are borne singly or in small clusters up to five, and are freely borne. The flowers are bicolored, cream with reddish-pink edges, and with little fading as the flower matures. The rose has a strong, wild rose fragrance and glossy, dark green foliage. The plant is recommended for USDA zone 4b and warmer.

== See also ==
- Garden roses
- Rose Hall of Fame
- List of Award of Garden Merit roses

== Notes ==
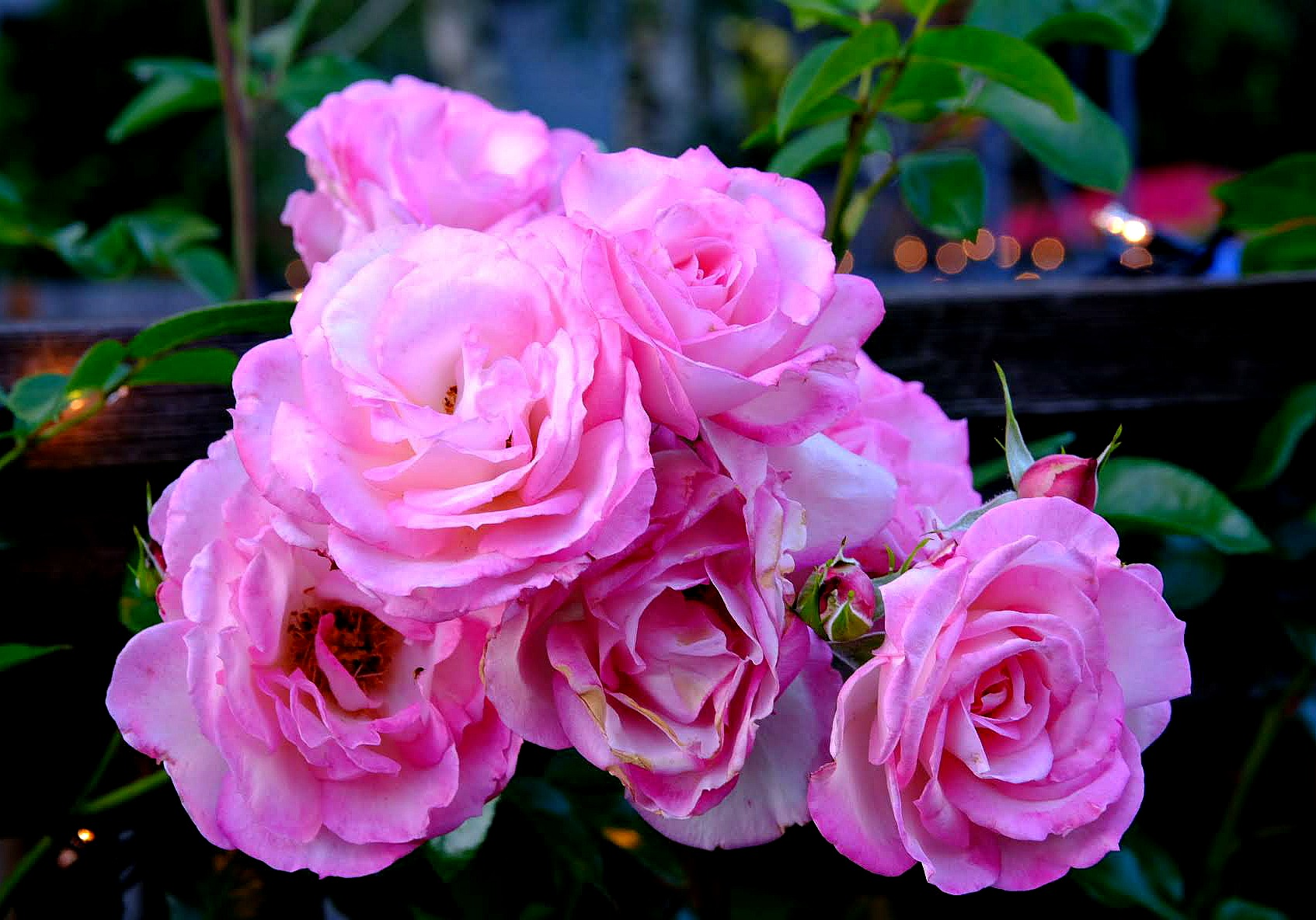
'Harlekin' rose cluster
