= Hörnerkirchen =

- Amt
- Map of Pinneberg highlighting Hörnerkirchen
- Interactive map of Hörnerkirchen
- Location within Germany Location within Schleswig-Holstein
- Coordinates: 53°51′N 9°43′E
- Country: Germany
- State: Schleswig-Holstein
- District: Pinneberg
- Seat: Brande-Hörnerkirchen
- Subdivisions: 4 municipalities

Government
  - Mayor: Lucas Unger (CDU)

Area
  - Total: 44.91 km^{2} (17.34 sq mi)

Population (2025-12-31)
  - Total: 4,049
  - Density: 90.16/km^{2} (233.5/sq mi)
- Time zone: UTC+01:00 (CET)
  - Summer (DST): UTC+02:00 (CEST)
- Website: www.amt-hoernerkirchen.de

Hörnerkirchen is an Amt ("collective municipality") in the district of Pinneberg, in Schleswig-Holstein, Germany. It is situated approximately 12 km northeast of Elmshorn. The seat of the Amt is in Brande-Hörnerkirchen.

The Amt ("collective municipality") Hörnerkirchen consists of the following municipalities:

- Bokel
- Brande-Hörnerkirchen
- Osterhorn
- Westerhorn
