= Seestermühe =

- Municipality
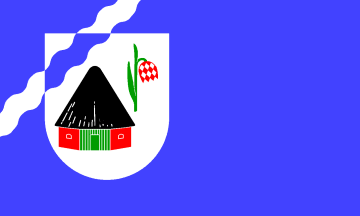
- Flag Coat of arms

- Location of Seestermühe within Pinneberg district
- Interactive map of Seestermühe
- Location within Germany Location within Schleswig-Holstein
- Coordinates: 53°42′N 9°34′E
- Country: Germany
- State: Schleswig-Holstein
- District: Pinneberg
- Municipal assoc.: Elmshorn-Land

Government
  - Mayor: Thorsten Rockel

Area
  - Total: 23.35 km^{2} (9.02 sq mi)
- Elevation: 1 m (3.3 ft)

Population (2025-12-31)
  - Total: 968
  - Density: 41.5/km^{2} (107/sq mi)
- Time zone: UTC+01:00 (CET)
  - Summer (DST): UTC+02:00 (CEST)
- Postal codes: 25371
- Dialling codes: 04125
- Vehicle registration: PI
- Website: www.elmshorn- land.de

Seestermühe is a municipality in the district of Pinneberg, in Schleswig-Holstein, Germany.
