= Ellerbek =

- Municipality
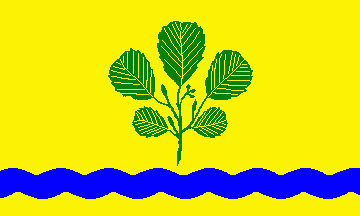
- Flag Coat of arms

- Location of Ellerbek within Pinneberg district
- Interactive map of Ellerbek
- Location within Germany Location within Schleswig-Holstein
- Coordinates: 53°39′26″N 9°52′11″E
- Country: Germany
- State: Schleswig-Holstein
- District: Pinneberg
- Municipal assoc.: Pinnau

Government
  - Mayor: Günther Hildebrand (FDP)

Area
  - Total: 9.11 km^{2} (3.52 sq mi)
- Elevation: 9 m (30 ft)

Population (2025-12-31)
  - Total: 4,402
  - Density: 483/km^{2} (1,250/sq mi)
- Time zone: UTC+01:00 (CET)
  - Summer (DST): UTC+02:00 (CEST)
- Postal codes: 25474
- Dialling codes: 04101
- Vehicle registration: PI
- Website: www.amt-pinnau.de

Ellerbek (German pronunciation: [ˈɛlɐbeːk]) is a municipality in the district of Pinneberg in Schleswig-Holstein in Germany. It consists of the two parts, Ellerbek-Dorf (Ellerbek-Village; also called Alt-Ellerbek or Old-Ellerbek) and Neu-Ellerbek.

== Geography and Traffic ==
Ellerbek borders on Hamburg-Schnelsen and Bönningstedt to the east, Rellingen to the south and west, and Tangstedt to the north. Moorgraben, Mühlenau and Beek flow through the municipality. Beek and Mühlenau were canalised in the 1970s and provided with barrages to regulate the water level. In the course of the renaturation, barrages in the Ellerbeck area have been replaced by slides in order to restore the fishability of the waters.

Ellerbek is connected within the Hamburger Verkehrsverbund (HVV) by the VHH bus routes 195 and 295 with the district town of Pinneberg on the one hand and Hamburg-Schnelsen and the Niendorf Nord underground station as well as Bönningstedt and the Garstedt underground station in Norderstedt on the other. To the east of the municipality, the AKN's A1 HVV suburban railway line runs tangentially from Hamburg-Eidelstedt (here S-Bahn connection) via Schnelsen, Bönningstedt, Quickborn and Henstedt-Ulzburg to Kaltenkirchen, and then via Bad Bramstedt to Neumünster.

== History ==
The district of Ellerbek-Dorf was the original core of the settlement with farms, municipal administration and the first school. The district of Neu-Ellerbek emerged as a refugee settlement after 1945. While the village retained a rural character, characterized by farms and tree nurseries, until the 1980s, Neu-Ellerbek was a newly built settlement with single-family houses and businesses.

== Politics ==
=== Community Representation ===
Result of the local elections on May 6, 2018

Political Party	Percent	seats
FDP	37,97%	6
CDU	34,26%	6
SPD	27,77%	5

=== Coat of arms ===
The coat of arms was approved on August 6, 1970.

Blazon: "In gold, an upright green alder branch with five leaves above a blue wavy bar in the base of the shield."

The alder branch in the coat of arms of the municipality of Ellerbek gives according to the procedure of pars pro toto, d. H. the only partial representation of an object, the Eller, i.e. the alder, figuratively again. The wave bar stands for the brook, in Low German "Bek". The place name is reproduced in a verbal way through both figures. Just like Ellerau, the community name Ellerbek means "Erlenbach". The linguistic difference is insignificant. Objectively, however, it can be justified by a different topography. In most cases, a floodplain means a watercourse in a meadow landscape, while a brook can also flow in stony or wooded areas. This is the case here: Until the last century, Ellerbek belonged to the Pinneberg House and Forest Bailiwick and, in addition to several “bush paddocks” belonging to the local residents, housed on its field mark. H. Plots of land lined with trees, the royal Ellerbeker enclosure. The abundance of wood in the place has led to a certain prosperity, which is indicated by the golden color of the shield.

The coat of arms was designed by the Brunsbüttel heraldist Willy "Horsa" Lippert.

=== Flag ===
The flag was approved on September 24, 2009.

On a yellow flag cloth the figures of the municipal coat of arms in tincture suitable for the flag.

== Education ==
With the Hermann Löns School, founded in 1963, Ellerbek has a primary school for grades 1 to 4.

== Sports ==
The TSV Ellerbek achieved a certain degree of awareness, especially through its handball teams. TSV Ellerbek has reported around 30 handball teams in the point game operation.

In addition to handball, table tennis (formerly also SG Ellerbek-Halstenbek), volleyball, swimming and many courses are offered.

The Ellerbek tennis club was founded in 1966 and has around 350 members. The tennis facility with originally two clay courts was expanded to eight courts by 1981. In May 2012, a certified German tennis school was opened at TC Ellerbek.
