= Groß Offenseth-Aspern =

- Municipality
- Coat of arms

- Location of Groß Offenseth-Aspern within Pinneberg district
- Interactive map of Groß Offenseth-Aspern
- Location within Germany Location within Schleswig-Holstein
- Coordinates: 53°49′N 9°44′E
- Country: Germany
- State: Schleswig-Holstein
- District: Pinneberg
- Municipal assoc.: Rantzau

Government
  - Mayor: Werner Schlüter

Area
  - Total: 10.56 km^{2} (4.08 sq mi)
- Elevation: 14 m (46 ft)

Population (2025-12-31)
  - Total: 495
  - Density: 46.9/km^{2} (121/sq mi)
- Time zone: UTC+01:00 (CET)
  - Summer (DST): UTC+02:00 (CEST)
- Postal codes: 25355
- Dialling codes: 04123
- Vehicle registration: PI
- Website: www.amt-rantzau.de

Groß Offenseth-Aspern is a municipality in the district of Pinneberg, in Schleswig-Holstein, Germany.
