= Klein Nordende =

- Municipality
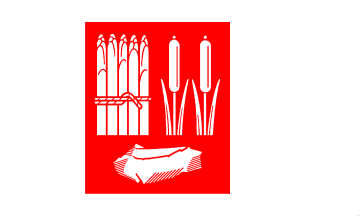
- Flag Coat of arms

- Location of Klein Nordende within Pinneberg district
- Interactive map of Klein Nordende
- Location within Germany Location within Schleswig-Holstein
- Coordinates: 53°43′N 9°39′E
- Country: Germany
- State: Schleswig-Holstein
- District: Pinneberg
- Municipal assoc.: Elmshorn-Land

Government
  - Mayor: Hans-Barthold Schinckel

Area
  - Total: 10.79 km^{2} (4.17 sq mi)
- Elevation: 10 m (33 ft)

Population (2025-12-31)
  - Total: 3,362
  - Density: 311.6/km^{2} (807.0/sq mi)
- Time zone: UTC+01:00 (CET)
  - Summer (DST): UTC+02:00 (CEST)
- Postal codes: 25336
- Dialling codes: 04121
- Vehicle registration: PI
- Website: www.elmshorn-land.de

Klein Nordende is a municipality in the district of Pinneberg, in Schleswig-Holstein, Germany.
