= Brande-Hörnerkirchen =

- Municipality
- Coat of arms

- Location of Brande-Hörnerkirchen within Pinneberg district
- Interactive map of Brande-Hörnerkirchen
- Location within Germany Location within Schleswig-Holstein
- Coordinates: 53°51′25″N 9°42′24″E
- Country: Germany
- State: Schleswig-Holstein
- District: Pinneberg
- Municipal assoc.: Hörnerkirchen

Government
  - Mayor: Siegfried Winter (CDU)

Area
  - Total: 13.14 km^{2} (5.07 sq mi)
- Elevation: 9 m (30 ft)

Population (2025-12-31)
  - Total: 1,779
  - Density: 135.4/km^{2} (350.7/sq mi)
- Time zone: UTC+01:00 (CET)
  - Summer (DST): UTC+02:00 (CEST)
- Postal codes: 25364
- Dialling codes: 04127
- Vehicle registration: PI
- Website: www.amt- hoernerkirchen.de

Brande-Hörnerkirchen (German pronunciation: [ˈbʁandə hœʁnɐˈkɪʁçn̩]) is a municipality in the district of Pinneberg, in Schleswig-Holstein, Germany.
