= Bokholt-Hanredder =

- Municipality
- Coat of arms

- Location of Bokholt-Hanredder within Pinneberg district
- Interactive map of Bokholt-Hanredder
- Location within Germany Location within Schleswig-Holstein
- Coordinates: 53°47′9″N 9°43′04″E
- Country: Germany
- State: Schleswig-Holstein
- District: Pinneberg
- Municipal assoc.: Rantzau
- Subdivisions: 4

Government
  - Mayor: Wolfgang Mohr (CDU)

Area
  - Total: 8.56 km^{2} (3.31 sq mi)
- Elevation: 13 m (43 ft)

Population (2025-12-31)
  - Total: 1,338
  - Density: 156/km^{2} (405/sq mi)
- Time zone: UTC+01:00 (CET)
  - Summer (DST): UTC+02:00 (CEST)
- Postal codes: 25335
- Dialling codes: 04123, 04121
- Vehicle registration: PI
- Website: www.bokholt-hanredder.de

Bokholt-Hanredder is a municipality in the district of Pinneberg, in Schleswig-Holstein, Germany. Bokholt-Hanredder consists of the four districts Voßloch, Bokholt, Hanredder and Offenau, which are symbolically represented in the coat of arms (created in 1982). The fox represents Voßloch, the Offenau creek separates the district of the same name from the rest of the municipality. One beech leaf each represents the remaining two districts, which takes into account the names Bokholt (Low German: beech wood) and Redder (narrow dirt road between bends with deciduous trees such as beech).
