= Bilsen =

- Municipality
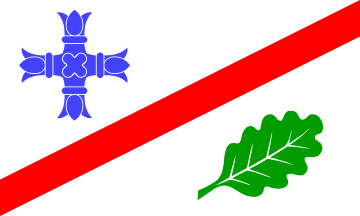
- Flag Coat of arms

- Location of Bilsen within Pinneberg district
- Interactive map of Bilsen
- Location within Germany Location within Schleswig-Holstein
- Coordinates: 53°46′17″N 9°52′36″E
- Country: Germany
- State: Schleswig-Holstein
- District: Pinneberg
- Municipal assoc.: Rantzau

Government
  - Mayor: Peter Lehnert (CDU)

Area
  - Total: 6.2 km^{2} (2.4 sq mi)
- Elevation: 28 m (92 ft)

Population (2025-12-31)
  - Total: 820
  - Density: 130/km^{2} (340/sq mi)
- Time zone: UTC+01:00 (CET)
  - Summer (DST): UTC+02:00 (CEST)
- Postal codes: 25485
- Dialling codes: 04106
- Vehicle registration: PI
- Website: www.bilsen.de

Bilsen (German pronunciation: [ˈbɪlzn̩]) is a municipality in the district of Pinneberg, in Schleswig-Holstein, Germany.
