= Elmshorn-Land =

- Amt
- Coat of arms

- Map of Pinneberg highlighting Elmshorn-Land
- Interactive map of Elmshorn-Land
- Location within Germany Location within Schleswig-Holstein
- Coordinates: 53°45′07″N 9°39′04″E
- Country: Germany
- State: Schleswig-Holstein
- District: Pinneberg
- Seat: Elmshorn
- Subdivisions: 7 municipalities

Government
  - Mayor: Thorsten Rockel

Area
  - Total: 89.29 km^{2} (34.48 sq mi)

Population (2025-12-31)
  - Total: 13,428
  - Density: 150.4/km^{2} (389.5/sq mi)
- Time zone: UTC+01:00 (CET)
  - Summer (DST): UTC+02:00 (CEST)
- Website: www.elmshorn-land.de

Elmshorn-Land is an Amt ("collective municipality") in the district of Pinneberg, in Schleswig-Holstein, Germany. It is situated around Elmshorn, which is the seat of the Amt, but not part of it.

The Amt ("collective municipality") Elmshorn-Land consists of the following municipalities:

- Klein Nordende
- Klein Offenseth-Sparrieshoop
- Kölln-Reisiek
- Raa-Besenbek
- Seester
- Seestermühe
- Seeth-Ekholt
