= Bullenkuhlen =

- Municipality
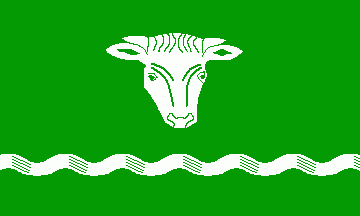
- Flag Coat of arms

- Location of Bullenkuhlen within Pinneberg district
- Interactive map of Bullenkuhlen
- Location within Germany Location within Schleswig-Holstein
- Coordinates: 53°46′N 9°45′E
- Country: Germany
- State: Schleswig-Holstein
- District: Pinneberg
- Municipal assoc.: Rantzau

Government
  - Mayor: Willi Hachmann

Area
  - Total: 3.93 km^{2} (1.52 sq mi)
- Elevation: 9 m (30 ft)

Population (2025-12-31)
  - Total: 395
  - Density: 101/km^{2} (260/sq mi)
- Time zone: UTC+01:00 (CET)
  - Summer (DST): UTC+02:00 (CEST)
- Postal codes: 25355
- Dialling codes: 04123
- Vehicle registration: PI
- Website: www.amt-rantzau.de

Bullenkuhlen (German pronunciation: [bʊlənˈkuːlən]) is a municipality in the district of Pinneberg, in Schleswig-Holstein, Germany.
