= Seester =

- Municipality
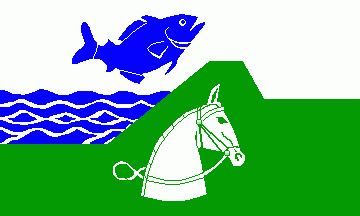
- Flag Coat of arms

- Location of Seester within Pinneberg district
- Interactive map of Seester
- Location within Germany Location within Schleswig-Holstein
- Coordinates: 53°43′N 9°34′E
- Country: Germany
- State: Schleswig-Holstein
- District: Pinneberg
- Municipal assoc.: Elmshorn-Land

Government
  - Mayor: Claus Hell (CDU)

Area
  - Total: 11.57 km^{2} (4.47 sq mi)
- Elevation: 7 m (23 ft)

Population (2025-12-31)
  - Total: 1,044
  - Density: 90.23/km^{2} (233.7/sq mi)
- Time zone: UTC+01:00 (CET)
  - Summer (DST): UTC+02:00 (CEST)
- Postal codes: 25370
- Dialling codes: 04125 (04121, 04122)
- Vehicle registration: PI
- Website: www.elmshorn- land.de

Seester (German pronunciation: [ˈzeːstɐ]) is a municipality in the district of Pinneberg, in Schleswig-Holstein, Germany.
