= Klein Offenseth-Sparrieshoop =

- Municipality
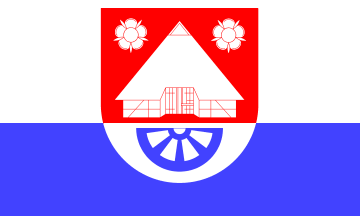
- Flag Coat of arms

- Location of Klein Offenseth-Sparrieshoop within Pinneberg district
- Interactive map of Klein Offenseth-Sparrieshoop
- Location within Germany Location within Schleswig-Holstein
- Coordinates: 53°47′50″N 9°42′0″E
- Country: Germany
- State: Schleswig-Holstein
- District: Pinneberg
- Municipal assoc.: Elmshorn-Land

Government
  - Mayor: Günther Korff (SPD)

Area
  - Total: 16.92 km^{2} (6.53 sq mi)
- Elevation: 5 m (16 ft)

Population (2025-12-31)
  - Total: 3,053
  - Density: 180.4/km^{2} (467.3/sq mi)
- Time zone: UTC+01:00 (CET)
  - Summer (DST): UTC+02:00 (CEST)
- Postal codes: 25365
- Dialling codes: 04121 04126 04127
- Vehicle registration: PI
- Website: www.elmshorn-land.de

Klein Offenseth-Sparrieshoop is a municipality in the district of Pinneberg, in Schleswig-Holstein, Germany.
