= Langeln, Schleswig-Holstein =

Langeln
- Municipality
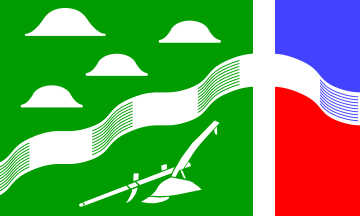
- Flag Coat of arms

- Location of Langeln within Pinneberg district
- Interactive map of Langeln
- Location within Germany Location within Schleswig-Holstein
- Coordinates: 53°47′48″N 9°51′16″E
- Country: Germany
- State: Schleswig-Holstein
- District: Pinneberg
- Municipal assoc.: Rantzau
- Subdivisions: 4

Government
  - Mayor: Hans-Detlef Fuhlendorf

Area
  - Total: 10.28 km^{2} (3.97 sq mi)
- Elevation: 19 m (62 ft)

Population (2025-12-31)
  - Total: 601
  - Density: 58.5/km^{2} (151/sq mi)
- Time zone: UTC+01:00 (CET)
  - Summer (DST): UTC+02:00 (CEST)
- Postal codes: 25485
- Dialling codes: 04123
- Vehicle registration: PI
- Website: www.langeln.de

Langeln (German pronunciation: [ˈlaŋl̩n]) is a municipality in the district of Pinneberg, in Schleswig-Holstein, Germany.
