= Seeth-Ekholt =

- Municipality
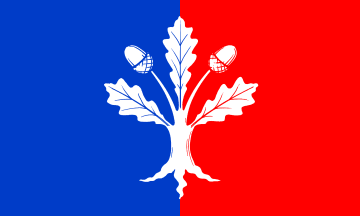
- Flag Coat of arms

- Location of Seeth-Ekholt within Pinneberg district
- Interactive map of Seeth-Ekholt
- Location within Germany Location within Schleswig-Holstein
- Coordinates: 53°44′44″N 9°43′45″E
- Country: Germany
- State: Schleswig-Holstein
- District: Pinneberg
- Municipal assoc.: Elmshorn-Land

Government
  - Mayor: Michael Rosenthal (CDU)

Area
  - Total: 6.89 km^{2} (2.66 sq mi)
- Elevation: 1 m (3.3 ft)

Population (2025-12-31)
  - Total: 1,019
  - Density: 148/km^{2} (383/sq mi)
- Time zone: UTC+01:00 (CET)
  - Summer (DST): UTC+02:00 (CEST)
- Postal codes: 25337
- Dialling codes: 04120,04121
- Vehicle registration: PI
- Website: www.elmshorn-land.de

Seeth-Ekholt is a municipality in the district of Pinneberg, in Schleswig-Holstein, Germany.
