= Bevern, Schleswig-Holstein =

Bevern
- Municipality
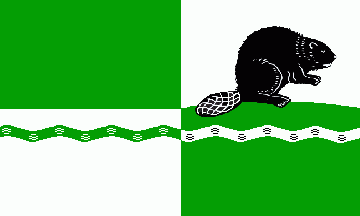
- Flag Coat of arms

- Location of Bevern within Pinneberg district
- Interactive map of Bevern
- Location within Germany Location within Schleswig-Holstein
- Coordinates: 53°45′N 9°46′E
- Country: Germany
- State: Schleswig-Holstein
- District: Pinneberg
- Municipal assoc.: Rantzau

Government
  - Mayor: Johann Hachmann

Area
  - Total: 8.04 km^{2} (3.10 sq mi)
- Elevation: 11 m (36 ft)

Population (2025-12-31)
  - Total: 622
  - Density: 77.4/km^{2} (200/sq mi)
- Time zone: UTC+01:00 (CET)
  - Summer (DST): UTC+02:00 (CEST)
- Postal codes: 25355
- Dialling codes: 04120, 04123
- Vehicle registration: PI
- Website: www.amt- rantzau.de

Bevern (German pronunciation: [ˈbeːvɐn]) is a municipality in the district of Pinneberg, in Schleswig-Holstein, Germany.
