= Kummerfeld =

- Municipality
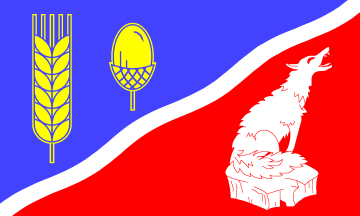
- Flag Coat of arms

- Location of Kummerfeld within Pinneberg district
- Interactive map of Kummerfeld
- Location within Germany Location within Schleswig-Holstein
- Coordinates: 53°41′N 9°47′E
- Country: Germany
- State: Schleswig-Holstein
- District: Pinneberg
- Municipal assoc.: Pinnau

Government
  - Mayor: Erika Koll (SPD)

Area
  - Total: 6.5 km^{2} (2.5 sq mi)
- Elevation: 13 m (43 ft)

Population (2025-12-31)
  - Total: 2,467
  - Density: 380/km^{2} (980/sq mi)
- Time zone: UTC+01:00 (CET)
  - Summer (DST): UTC+02:00 (CEST)
- Postal codes: 25495
- Dialling codes: 04101, 04120
- Vehicle registration: PI
- Website: www.amt-pinnau.de

Kummerfeld (German pronunciation: [ˈkʊmɐfɛlt]) is a municipality in the district of Pinneberg, in Schleswig-Holstein, Germany.
