= Bönningstedt =

- Municipality
- Flag Coat of arms

- Location of Bönningstedt within Pinneberg district
- Interactive map of Bönningstedt
- Location within Germany Location within Schleswig-Holstein
- Coordinates: 53°39′57″N 9°54′23″E
- Country: Germany
- State: Schleswig-Holstein
- District: Pinneberg

Government
  - Mayor: Rolf Lammert (CDU)

Area
  - Total: 12.05 km^{2} (4.65 sq mi)
- Elevation: 13 m (43 ft)

Population (2025-12-31)
  - Total: 4,566
  - Density: 378.9/km^{2} (981.4/sq mi)
- Time zone: UTC+01:00 (CET)
  - Summer (DST): UTC+02:00 (CEST)
- Postal codes: 25474
- Dialling codes: 040
- Vehicle registration: PI
- Website: boenningstedt.de

Bönningstedt (German pronunciation: [ˈbœnɪŋʃtɛt]) is a municipality in the district of Pinneberg, in Schleswig-Holstein, Germany. It is 8 kilometres (5.0 mi) east of Pinneberg, and 13 kilometres (8.1 mi) north of Hamburg. It is a "twin town" with Seaford, in East Sussex on the south coast of England.

Bönningstedt was the seat of the Amt ("collective municipality") Bönningstedt. Between January 2007 and January 2013, it was part of the Amt Pinnau.

Bönningstedt used to be a destination for people from Hamburg to enjoy their leisure time. This is how this village grew.

Bönningstedt is connected to the public transport system of Hamburg via the AKN railway company.

Telephone numbers in Bönningstedt start with 040 (for Hamburg) but the municipality is in Schleswig-Holstein where telephone numbers start with 041XX. This is unusual, as telephone numbers indicate location.
