= Pinnau =

- Amt
- Map of Pinneberg highlighting Pinnau
- Interactive map of Pinnau
- Location within Germany Location within Schleswig-Holstein
- Coordinates: 53°41′N 9°50′E
- Country: Germany
- State: Schleswig-Holstein
- District: Pinneberg
- Seat: Rellingen
- Subdivisions: 5 municipalities

Government
  - Mayor: Harm Kähler

Area
  - Total: 48.24 km^{2} (18.63 sq mi)

Population (2025-12-31)
  - Total: 13,873
  - Density: 287.6/km^{2} (744.8/sq mi)
- Time zone: UTC+01:00 (CET)
  - Summer (DST): UTC+02:00 (CEST)
- Website: www.amt-pinnau.de

Pinnau is an Amt ("collective municipality") in the district of Pinneberg, in Schleswig-Holstein, Germany. The Amt Pinnau was formed in January 2007 by the merger of the Ämter Bönningstedt and Pinneberg-Land. The seat of the Amt is in Rellingen, itself not part of the Amt.

The Amt Pinnau consists of the following municipalities:

1. Borstel-Hohenraden
2. Ellerbek
3. Kummerfeld
4. Prisdorf
5. Tangstedt
