= Prisdorf =

- Municipality
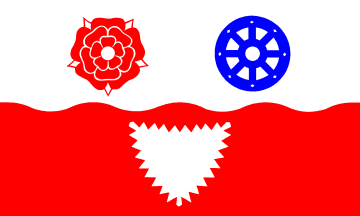
- Flag Coat of arms

- Location of Prisdorf within Pinneberg district
- Interactive map of Prisdorf
- Location within Germany Location within Schleswig-Holstein
- Coordinates: 53°40′38″N 9°45′39″E
- Country: Germany
- State: Schleswig-Holstein
- District: Pinneberg
- Municipal assoc.: Pinnau

Government
  - Mayor: Rolf Schwarz

Area
  - Total: 5.23 km^{2} (2.02 sq mi)
- Elevation: 6 m (20 ft)

Population (2025-12-31)
  - Total: 2,289
  - Density: 438/km^{2} (1,130/sq mi)
- Time zone: UTC+01:00 (CET)
  - Summer (DST): UTC+02:00 (CEST)
- Postal codes: 25497
- Dialling codes: 04101
- Vehicle registration: PI
- Website: www.amt-pinnau.de

Prisdorf is a municipality in the district of Pinneberg, in Schleswig-Holstein, Germany. It was first mentioned in documents in 1342.
