= Hasloh =

- Municipality
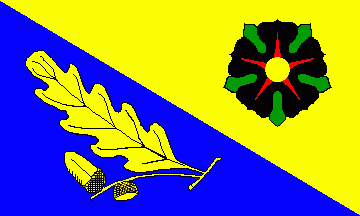
- Flag Coat of arms

- Location of Hasloh within Pinneberg district
- Interactive map of Hasloh
- Location within Germany Location within Schleswig-Holstein
- Coordinates: 53°41′57″N 9°54′47″E
- Country: Germany
- State: Schleswig-Holstein
- District: Pinneberg

Government
  - Mayor: Kay Löhr (FDP)

Area
  - Total: 11.07 km^{2} (4.27 sq mi)
- Elevation: 24 m (79 ft)

Population (2025-12-31)
  - Total: 3,989
  - Density: 360.3/km^{2} (933.3/sq mi)
- Time zone: UTC+01:00 (CET)
  - Summer (DST): UTC+02:00 (CEST)
- Postal codes: 25474
- Dialling codes: 04106
- Vehicle registration: PI
- Website: www.amt-pinnau.de

Hasloh is a municipality in the district of Pinneberg, in Schleswig-Holstein, Germany.

== Geography ==
Hasloh is north of Hamburg, west of Norderstedt, and south of Quickborn.

Hasloh lies directly on the Bundesstraße 4. The A7 travels east of the town. The Hamburg-Altona–Neumünster railway travels through Hasloh. As a result, the town is connected to the HVV network.
