= Borstel-Hohenraden =

- Municipality
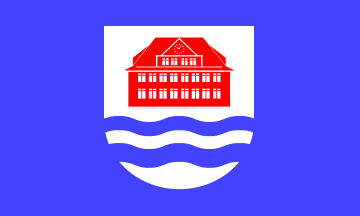
- Flag Coat of arms

- Location of Borstel-Hohenraden within Pinneberg district
- Interactive map of Borstel-Hohenraden
- Location within Germany Location within Schleswig-Holstein
- Coordinates: 53°41′N 9°49′E
- Country: Germany
- State: Schleswig-Holstein
- District: Pinneberg
- Municipal assoc.: Pinnau

Government
  - Mayor: Jürgen Rahn (CDU)

Area
  - Total: 14.88 km^{2} (5.75 sq mi)
- Elevation: 4 m (13 ft)

Population (2025-12-31)
  - Total: 2,441
  - Density: 164.0/km^{2} (424.9/sq mi)
- Time zone: UTC+01:00 (CET)
  - Summer (DST): UTC+02:00 (CEST)
- Postal codes: 25494
- Dialling codes: 04101
- Vehicle registration: PI
- Website: www.amt-pinnau.de

Borstel-Hohenraden is a municipality in the district of Pinneberg, in Schleswig-Holstein, Germany. The municipality Borstel-Hohenraden (about 2,250 inhabitants) with the districts Borstel and Hohenraden is located northeast of the county town Pinneberg. National road no. 76 leads through the town, connecting Pinneberg and Quickborn and interconnects with the two highways Hamburg-Kiel and Hamburg Itzehoe.

The first mention of Borstel (Borstele) dates back to 1388. The first mention of the local part Hohenraden (Hohenrade) goes back to the year 1638. In 1988 the municipality of Borstel-Hohenraden celebrated the 600th anniversary of its first mention recorded mention on May 19, 1388.

On the origin and meaning of the name: "Tho the Borstelde" in "Kerspell Rellinghen" clearly indicate our Borstel. Over the centuries, the name of Borstelde over Borstele, Borstell, Borsteler altered, Barstell to Borstel (the Urdorf). Originally, the name comes from the Old Saxon "bur" = home and "Stal" = location facility. The name can be found very often, not only in Schleswig-Holstein, but also in Hamburg and Lower Saxony. The name of the daughter of the village Hohenraden indicates a later scale of Borstelern cleared area. As late as 1688, this place was called "the Hohenrade" and only in the 19th century is the place named Hohenraden. Rade (Rode) means clearing, so the high-altitude clearance. It was also suggested that it was the settlement that was only with the "high wheel" available. Structurally, the municipality Borstel-Hohenraden has developed in recent years from a farming village into a residential community. The aim is to preserve the functions of housing and agriculture alike. The community is faced with the task of infrastructural measures to improve the quality of living for the people living in the municipality inhabitants constantly.

In the municipality of Borstel-Hohenraden following communal facilities are to be found: Primary school with a gymnasium for multipurpose use Sportstättenanlage'mit lawn and Grand Place and two beach volleyball courts kindergarten operated by the St. John Regional Association eV Hamburg playgrounds Following the sister station of diaconal nursing and care of the Lutheran. Parish in Kummerfeld Fire Department (Fire Station and Fire Brigade classroom building complex at the school at the Quickborner Straße) clubs and associations.
