= Barmstedt =

- Town
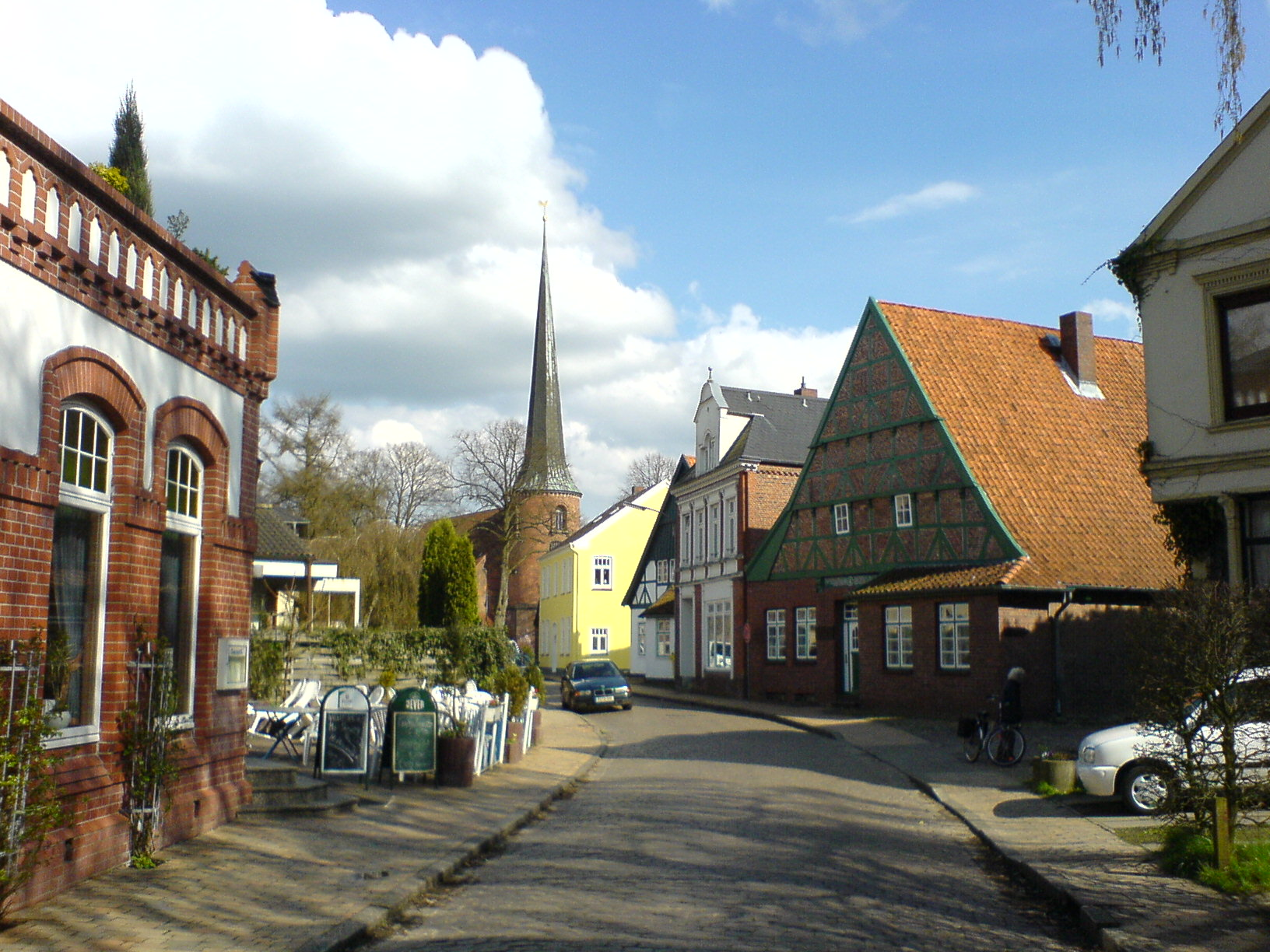
- Street view in Barmstedt

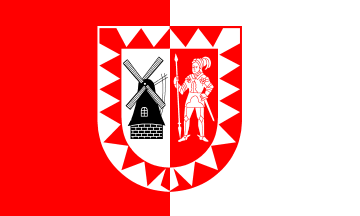
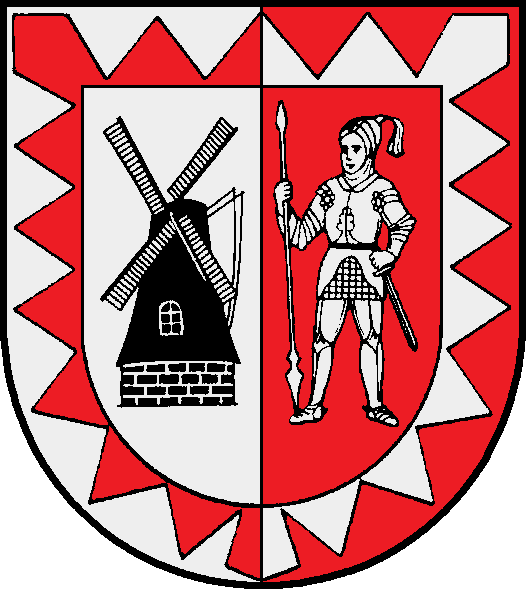
- Flag Coat of arms

- Location of Barmstedt within Pinneberg district
- Interactive map of Barmstedt
- Location within Germany Location within Schleswig-Holstein
- Coordinates: 53°47′N 9°46′E
- Country: Germany
- State: Schleswig-Holstein
- District: Pinneberg

Government
  - Mayor: Heike Döpke

Area
  - Total: 17.17 km^{2} (6.63 sq mi)
- Elevation: 11 m (36 ft)

Population (2025-12-31)
  - Total: 10,402
  - Density: 605.8/km^{2} (1,569/sq mi)
- Time zone: UTC+01:00 (CET)
  - Summer (DST): UTC+02:00 (CEST)
- Postal codes: 25355
- Dialling codes: 04123
- Vehicle registration: PI
- Website: www.barmstedt.de

Barmstedt (German pronunciation: [ˈbaʁmˌʃtɛt]; Low German: Barmsteed) is a town in the district of Pinneberg, in the south of Schleswig-Holstein, Germany. It is situated approximately 8 km northeast of Elmshorn, and 30 km northwest of Hamburg. It has approximately 10,400 inhabitants which makes it the smallest town in the Pinneberg district.

== Culture ==
There were 133 shoemakers working in Barmstedt in 1839. Only one remains today, and it was in Barmstedt that the shoe retailer Gabor Shoes was founded. The ex German champion in unicycling, Peer Fischer, was born in Barmstedt.

The town is twinned with Oakham, England.

== Personality ==
=== Connected to Barmstedt ===
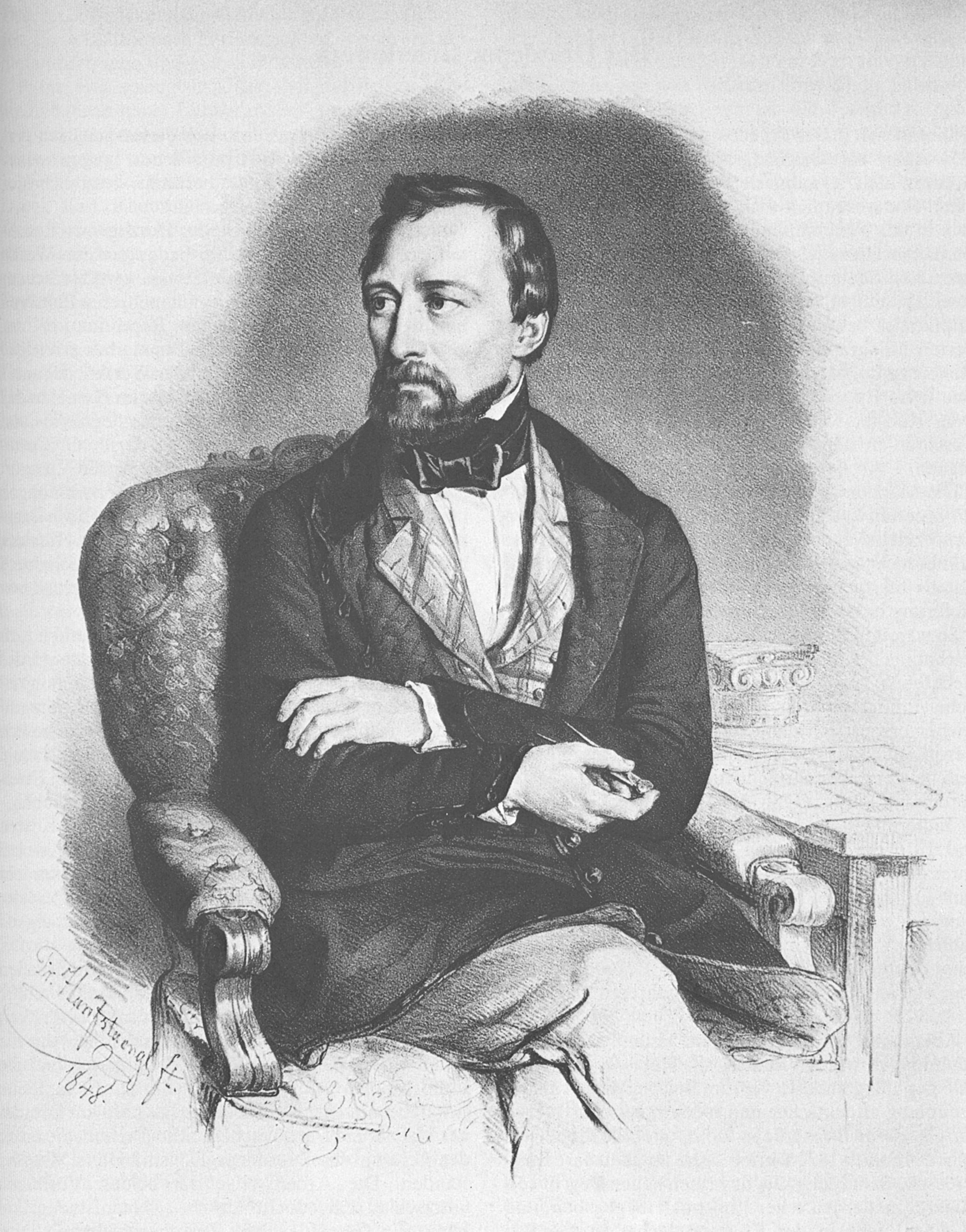
Gottfried Semper 1848

- Johann Hinrich Klapmeyer (around 1690-1757), organ builder, built in 1717 the organ of the Heiligen-Geist-Kirche
- Gottfried Semper (1803-1879), architect, Semper Opera, went here during his childhood some years to school
