= Pinneberg (district) =

Coordinates: 53°45′N 9°45′E

- District
- Flag Coat of arms

- Country: Germany
- State: Schleswig-Holstein
- Capital: Pinneberg

Government
  - District admin.: Elfi Heesch

Area
  - Total: 664 km^{2} (256 sq mi)

Population (31 December 2024)
  - Total: 325,223
  - Density: 490/km^{2} (1,270/sq mi)
- Time zone: UTC+01:00 (CET)
  - Summer (DST): UTC+02:00 (CEST)
- Vehicle registration: PI
- Website: kreis-pinneberg.de

Pinneberg (German: [ˈpʰɪnəbɛɐ̯k]) is a district in Schleswig-Holstein, Germany. It is bounded by (from the northwest and clockwise) the districts of Steinburg and Segeberg, the city (and state) of Hamburg and the state of Lower Saxony (district Stade). The island of Heligoland is also part of the district.

== History ==
The district is roughly identical to the former county of Holstein-Pinneberg. It was established by the Prussian administration in 1867. Since then there has been a continuous loss of territory to the neighbouring cities of Altona (later itself a part of Hamburg), Hamburg and Norderstedt. The island of Heligoland, formerly a district by itself, joined the district in 1932.

== Geography ==
The district is situated on the northern bank of the Elbe River. While Pinneberg is the smallest district within Schleswig-Holstein, it has the most inhabitants. Due to the growing Hamburg metropolitan area the population is still increasing. The district consists mainly of the northwestern suburbs of Hamburg. Although the district of Pinneberg is only connected to the sea through the Elbe, the archipelago of Heligoland became a part of this district in 1932.

== Coat of arms ==
The coat of arms displays a fir tree inside a white nettle-leaf. The leaf is from the arms of the county of Holstein-Schauenburg. The tree symbolises the forestry in the district.

== Towns and municipalities ==
Clickable map of towns and municipalities in the district

Independent towns
1. Barmstedt
2. Elmshorn
3. Pinneberg
4. Quickborn
5. Schenefeld
6. Tornesch
7. Uetersen
8. Wedel
Independent municipalities
1. Bönningstedt
2. Halstenbek
3. Hasloh
4. Heligoland
5. Rellingen

Ämter
1. Elmshorn-Land [seat: Elmshorn]; 1. Klein Nordende; 2. Klein Offenseth-Sparrieshoop; 3. Kölln-Reisiek; 4. Raa-Besenbek; 5. Seester; 6. Seestermühe; 7. Seeth-Ekholt	2. Geest und Marsch Südholstein; 1. Appen; 2. Groß Nordende; 3. Haselau; 4. Haseldorf; 5. Heidgraben; 6. Heist; 7. Hetlingen; 8. Holm; 9. Moorrege^{1}; 10. Neuendeich	3. Hörnerkirchen; 1. Bokel; 2. Brande-Hörnerkirchen^{1}; 3. Osterhorn; 4. Westerhorn; 4. Pinnau [seat: Rellingen]; 1. Borstel-Hohenraden; 2. Ellerbek; 3. Kummerfeld; 4. Prisdorf; 5. Tangstedt	5. Rantzau [seat: Barmstedt]; 1. Bevern; 2. Bilsen; 3. Bokholt-Hanredder; 4. Bullenkuhlen; 5. Ellerhoop; 6. Groß Offenseth-Aspern; 7. Heede; 8. Hemdingen; 9. Langeln; 10. Lutzhorn
^{1}seat of the Amt

== Transport ==
Logo of the transport association HVV

Pinneberg district is located in the area of the transport association Hamburger Verkehrsverbund (HVV).
