= Enhanced other networks =

Enhanced other networks (EON) is a radio system used to deliver traffic information to enabled devices. It is a component of the European Radio Data System (RDS).

The system delivers traffic information (TP and TA) to enabled devices, by interrupting the current stream of media (radio, CD, etc.) and sends the traffic message.
