= NRSC =

NRSC may refer to:

- National Radio Systems Committee, radio broadcasting organization in the United States
- National Remote Sensing Centre, a centre of the Indian Space Research Organisation
- National Republican Senatorial Committee, US Senate Republican campaign arm
