= Holm, Pinneberg =

Holm
- Municipality
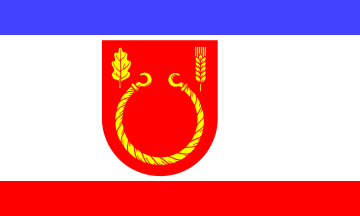
- Flag Coat of arms

- Location of Holm within Pinneberg district
- Interactive map of Holm
- Location within Germany Location within Schleswig-Holstein
- Coordinates: 53°37′N 9°40′E
- Country: Germany
- State: Schleswig-Holstein
- District: Pinneberg
- Municipal assoc.: Geest und Marsch Südholstein

Government
  - Mayor: Uwe Hüttner

Area
  - Total: 16.05 km^{2} (6.20 sq mi)
- Elevation: 11 m (36 ft)

Population (2025-12-31)
  - Total: 3,291
  - Density: 205.0/km^{2} (531.1/sq mi)
- Time zone: UTC+01:00 (CET)
  - Summer (DST): UTC+02:00 (CEST)
- Postal codes: 25488
- Dialling codes: 04103
- Vehicle registration: PI

Holm (German pronunciation: [hɔlm]) is a municipality in the district of Pinneberg, in Schleswig-Holstein, Germany. It is part of the Amt Geest und Marsch Südholstein.

In the eastern part is the local recreation area Holmer Sandberge, to the west of Holm begins the Elbmarsch.

The B 431 Highway runs through Holm and leads directly to Wedel and Hamburg, Uetersen, Pinneberg and Tornesch. Three bus lines connect Holm with the rapid transit railway in Wedel.

Holm's neighbour municipalities are Appen, Hetlingen and Heist.

== History ==
Holm is mentioned in a document for the first time on 29 April 1255. In the past centuries different ways of writing were used for the village of Holm: Holne, Hollen and Holling.

Holm is on the Ox Way, (Hærvejen (Danish, literally: the army road, German: Ochsenweg, literally: oxenway/road), an old army route, which was used for the oxdrift to the Ox-market in Wedel. Since the beginning of the 15th century large herds of up to 50,000 of cattle were driven from Jutland over Holm to Wedel.

A village school for Holm is documented in 1708. In 1716 about 80 children went to school in winter, in summer they were assigned to field and garden work. The compulsory schooling, for which no money was levied, existed only from 7th to the 10th year of age. Afterwards at the age of 13 had the children in summer to visit 2 days per week the Katechismus-school. In winter before the Konfirmation where daily instruction.

The volunteer fire-brigade was created on 1 April 1890.

== Cultural objects of interest ==
Holm has its own local museum of history, in which among other things a shoemaker workshop and furnishings and documents from private households, schools and public mechanisms are on display. The museum is accommodated, in a 1700 built Gulf-Stander-House

== Politics ==
17 seats are in the local council . Since 2003 at the local election the CDU won twelve seats and the SPD five.

== Church community center ==
In 1971 a church community center was being built for the Nord-Elbic Evangelical-Lutheran church, the church is at Roland in Wedel, in the parish district of Blankenese.

== Points of interests ==
- Wittmoor Measurement and Reception Station
