= ALERT FM =

American emergency notification system

ALERT FM is an emergency notification system that delivers messages from state, local, and/or private sector officials to citizens, schools, businesses, and first responders using the Radio Data System (data sub-carrier) of local FM radio stations. Messages are transported from a secure web-based portal to the data sub-carrier via GSSNet, a satellite data delivery system. These alerts and messages are then received on ALERT FM receivers (mobile, wall mounted, or USB) or on cell phones equipped with active FM chips and properly installed software.

ALERT FM receivers can be programmed to receive local NOAA weather warnings.

== Company ==
Global Security Systems, LLC (GSS), of Lafayette, Louisiana, is the manufacturer, producer, and systems integrator of ALERT FM and GSSNet (satellite data delivery system). GSS has offices in Jackson, Mississippi, Lafayette, Louisiana, Sarasota, and Ft. Lauderdale, Florida.

== The Network ==
ALERT FM messages are currently being broadcast via Satellite on the digital data sub-carriers of over 1100 radio stations in 14 states (Alabama, Arkansas, Arizona, California, Florida, Louisiana, Michigan, Mississippi, Missouri, New Jersey, New York, South Carolina, Tennessee, Texas, Virginia) and British Virgin Islands.

== Customers ==
In 2005, the Mississippi Office of Homeland Security awarded GSS the first in the nation a statewide contract to deploy the first nationwide phase of ALERT FM. This included installing broadcast equipment in 35 local FM radio stations and receivers in all 82 county emergency operations centers. This made the State of Mississippi the first state in America to use ALERT FM.

Since that time, ALERT FM has been expanded across the State of Mississippi and the United States. The Mississippi Emergency Management Agency was able to expand the Mississippi state-wide system to include a total of 85 radio stations in Mississippi. Several Mississippi counties and other local governments had purchased and began using the system on a local level. ALERT FM was implemented into all of the western Tennessee counties including the Memphis-Shelby County UASI; across counties in Alabama including the Black Belt region and Mobile; in multi-counties surrounding a nuclear power plant in Missouri; across coastal counties surrounding Corpus Christi, Texas; in three central South Carolina counties; into a border county in Michigan; into a Mississippi and Arizona tribal nation; and several community colleges across the country including colleges in Mississippi, Florida, and New Jersey.

== Integrated Public Alert and Warning System (IPAWS) ==
In 2010, ALERT FM successfully participated in a pilot project for Federal Emergency Management Agency to validate Radio Data System emergency notification for inclusion in the Integrated Public Alert and Warning System program. The study was conducted by Northrop Grumman and included RDS technology from ALERT FM, Alertus Technologies and Metis Secure. The one-year study concluded that RDS is a viable communication tool.

== See also ==
- Radio Data System
- Integrated Public Alert and Warning System
- Common Alerting Protocol
- Emergency management
- Emergency population warning
