= Blaupunkt =

German electronics manufacturer

Blaupunkt GmbH
- Type: Company with limited liability
- Industry: Electronics manufacturer
- Founded: 1924; 102 years ago
- Headquarters: Hildesheim, Germany
- Key people: Lars Placke (CEO)
- Products: Car audio systems, televisions, speakers
- Number of employees: 8,700 (2007)
- Parent: Aurelius Group
- Website: blaupunkt.com

Blaupunkt GmbH is a German brand, formerly a manufacturer, producing mostly car-audio gear and other electronic equipment. Owned by Robert Bosch GmbH from 1933 until 1 March 2009, it was sold to Aurelius AG of Germany. It filed for bankruptcy in late 2015 with liquidation proceedings completed in early 2016. The brand name survives and remains active, now managed by GIP Development SARL of Luxembourg, and is used in various product-groups worldwide such as televisions and kitchen appliances.

== History ==
Founded in 1924 in Berlin as "Ideal," the company was acquired by Robert Bosch AG in 1933. In 1938 it changed its name to "Blaupunkt", German for "blue point" or "blue dot", after the blue dot painted onto its headphones that had passed quality control.

In 1939, Blaupunkt employed 2,600 people. With the outbreak of World War II, the radio and television technology business was largely replaced by armaments contracts from the Wehrmacht. In addition to the continued production of civilian devices, Blaupunkt, in cooperation with the Berlin-based Bosch subsidiary Fernseh AG, developed and produced, among other things, the targeting camera for the Henschel Hs 293 D glide bomb and components for guided missiles. Blaupunkt manufactured radio receivers in small numbers in several major German cities and in Vienna. After the destruction of the Wilmersdorf production hall on March 1, 1943, by a British air raid, the majority of production was relocated to Reichenberg (then "Reichsgau Sudetenland"), Berlin-Treptow (East Berlin), and other locations. Toward the end of the war, all of these sites were occupied by the Red Army and subsequently placed under the administration of the Soviet Military Administration in Germany (SMAD) as part of war reparations.

In 1944, Blaupunkt employed a total of 4,100 people. In Küstrin, under the cover name "Udo-Werke GmbH" (named after Udo Werr, an employee of Blaupunkt managing director Paul Goerz), the production of Blaupunkt Corfu radar observation devices had been established. Since the Red Army's Vistula-Oder Offensive also targeted the Küstrin region, the factory was relocated in January 1945 to "Trillke-Werke GmbH" (see also Neuhof - ELFI/Trillke-Werk), located in the Hildesheim Forest. This company was a Bosch subsidiary established in the late 1930s as part of the Wehrmacht's rearmament program. According to the American Jewish Committee, the company employed forced laborers during the Nazi era. Workshops for electronic components were set up in the Gross-Rosen concentration camp in 1944, probably starting in June. Capacitors were soldered there.

After World War II, Blaupunkt moved its headquarters and production to Hildesheim.

Blaupunkt took over a former Philips/Grundig factory in Portugal to produce automotive head units. It is still owned and operated by Bosch, used exclusively to make OEM units for car manufacturers and 24V (e.g., Coach) AV equipment. Later, factories were set up in Tunisia (speakers) and Malaysia (speakers and electronics).

In 1949, Blaupunkt advertised the first FM-capable car radio. By the 1960 and 1970s, Blaupunkt had become one of the leading German manufacturers of car radios and car audio equipment. In 1983, it began selling an in-dash CD player.

After the 2011 take-over, Blaupunkt became a managed brand name, with all production outsourced to China.

== Products ==
Blaupunkt was involved in developing the Autofahrer-Rundfunk-Informationssystem traffic-information system for car radios and provided this feature on their German-market car radios from the late 1970s. The company attempted to have ARI used in the United States but had only a few radio stations per major city involved.

For many years, Blaupunkt car audio equipment models often carried the name of a city somewhere in the world, e.g., "London RDM126". In Blaupunkt model terminology, this can be translated as "An RDS CD player capable of controlling a Multichanger, rated at 4×30 W RMS (4 × 30 = 120) from the model year 1996". High-end models typically had German place names.

Blaupunkt also used the brand "Velocity" to sell products aimed at the top, audiophile end of the market. Audi, Volkswagen, Porsche, Mercedes-Benz, Proton, Vauxhall, Pontiac, Holden and BMW all fit Blaupunkt (now simply Bosch) products into their cars, often branded with the car manufacturer's mark (e.g., The VW Gamma, Audi Symphony or BMW Business CD lines), with Fiat using them, occasionally unbranded but generally unmodified. Some later Holden Astra models are fitted with Blaupunkt systems (with others being produced by Delphi Automotive). Blaupunkt also specialised in coach installations, selling TVs, multiple-speaker setups, and PA equipment to that industry. That part of the business has remained with Robert Bosch Car Multimedia GmbH, a 100% subsidiary of Robert Bosch GmbH. The Blaupunkt branding is no longer used, even on 'hidden' stickers.

== EV Charging Products ==
Blaupunkt has expanded into electric vehicle charging solutions, offering products for residential and commercial use. These include AC wallbox chargers, portable EV chargers, and DC fast charging stations designed for compatibility with a range of electric vehicles using Type 2 connectors.

Blaupunkt EV charging systems are used for home installations as well as commercial applications such as fleet charging, retail locations, and public charging infrastructure. The company also provides installation and support services in selected markets.

== Rockford Fosgate alliance ==
On 12 July 2012, Blaupunkt signed an agreement with Rockford Fosgate granting the Rockford Corporation exclusive distribution rights for the company's car multimedia and headphones range for the North American market. Rockford Fosgate sold Blaupunkt products, including car radios, navigation, amplifiers, loudspeakers, rear seat entertainment, connectivity, and electronics for the OEM market through distributors.

== Gallery ==
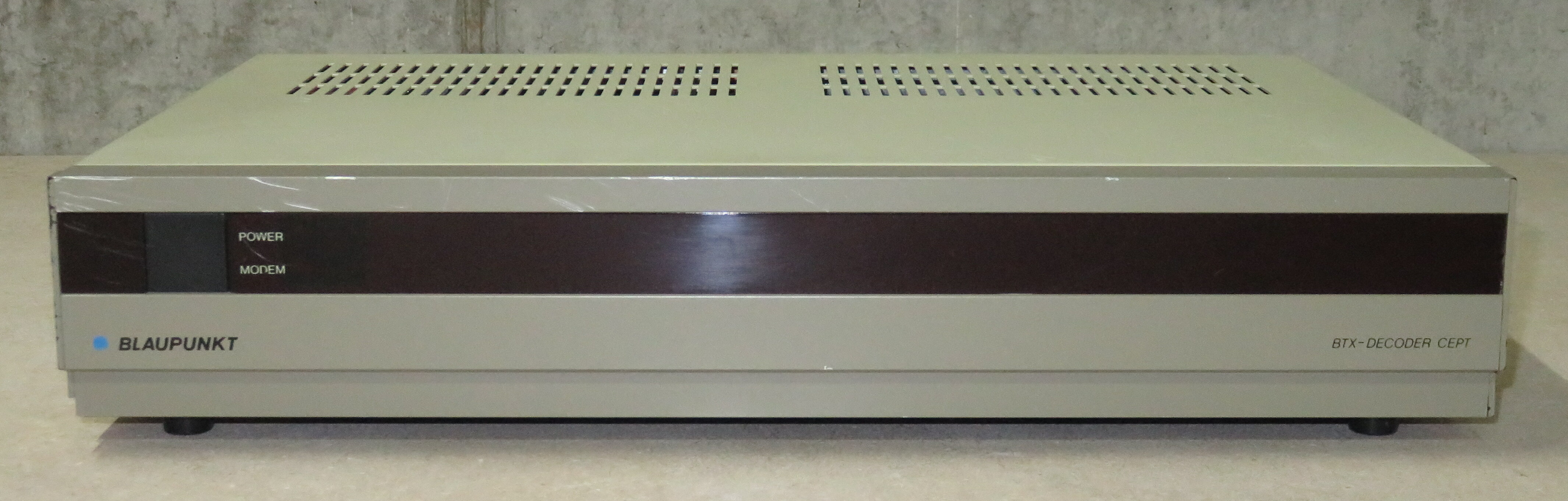
BTX Decoder DC 36

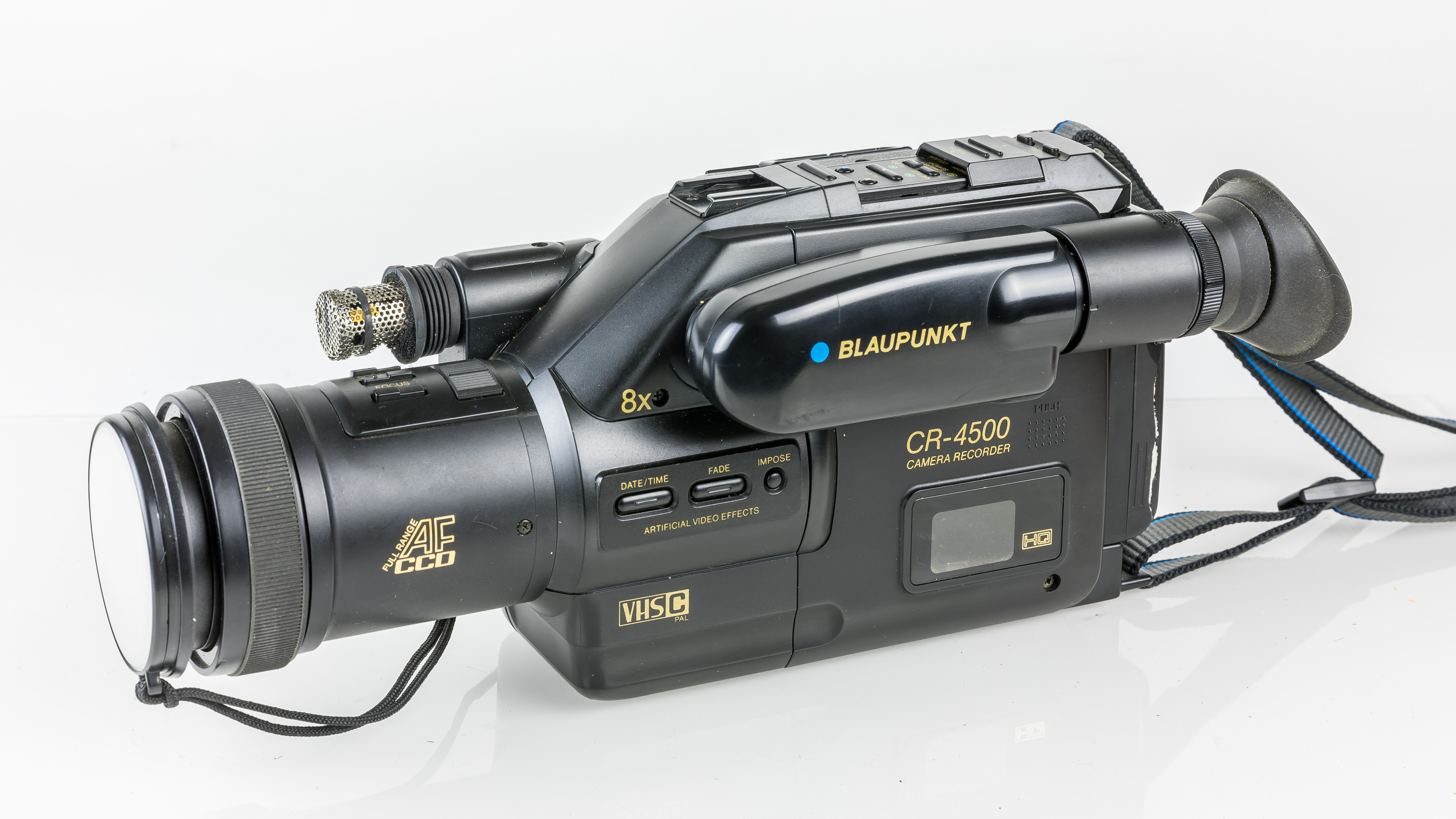
VHS-C camcorder CR 4500

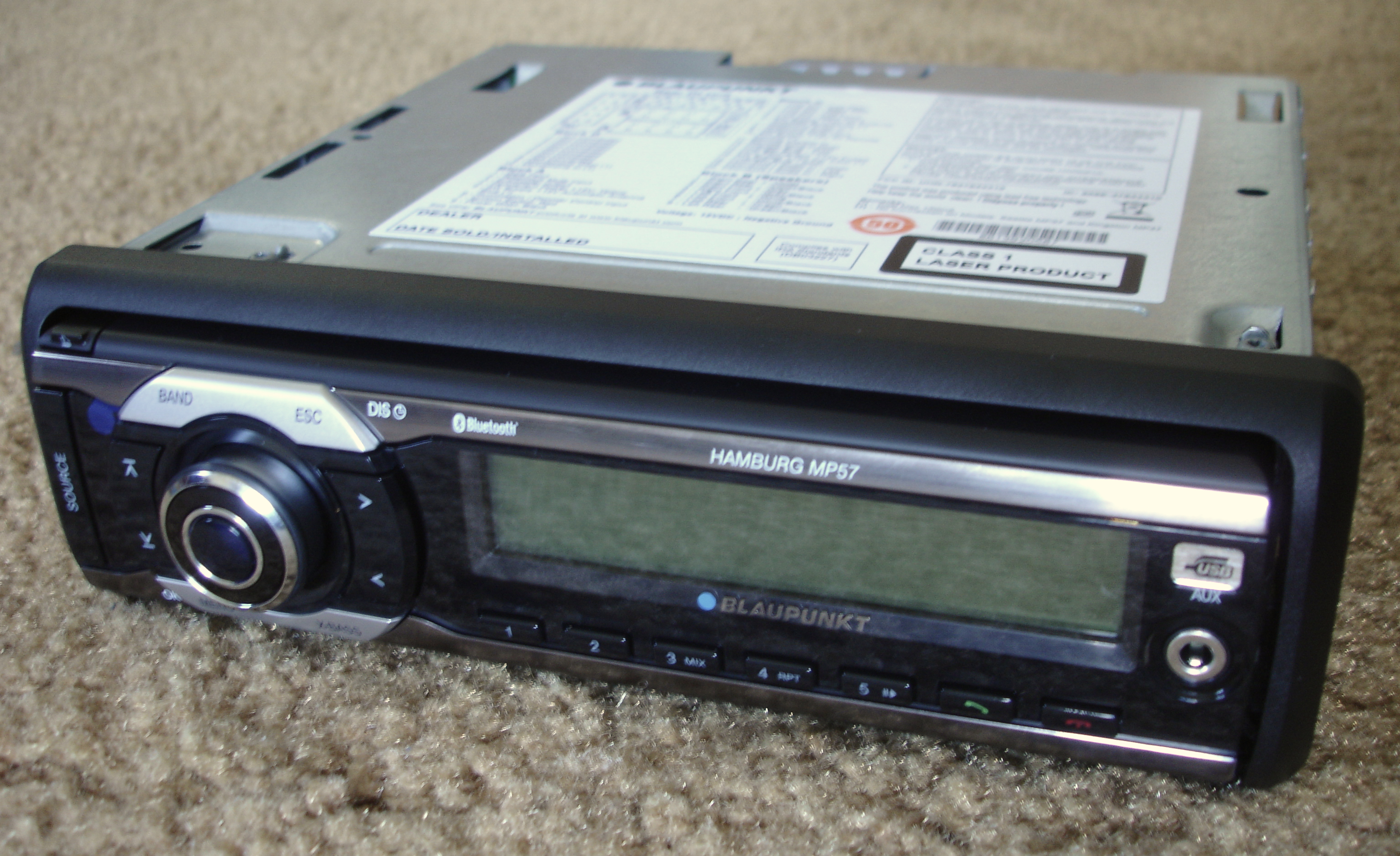
Hamburg MP57 head unit

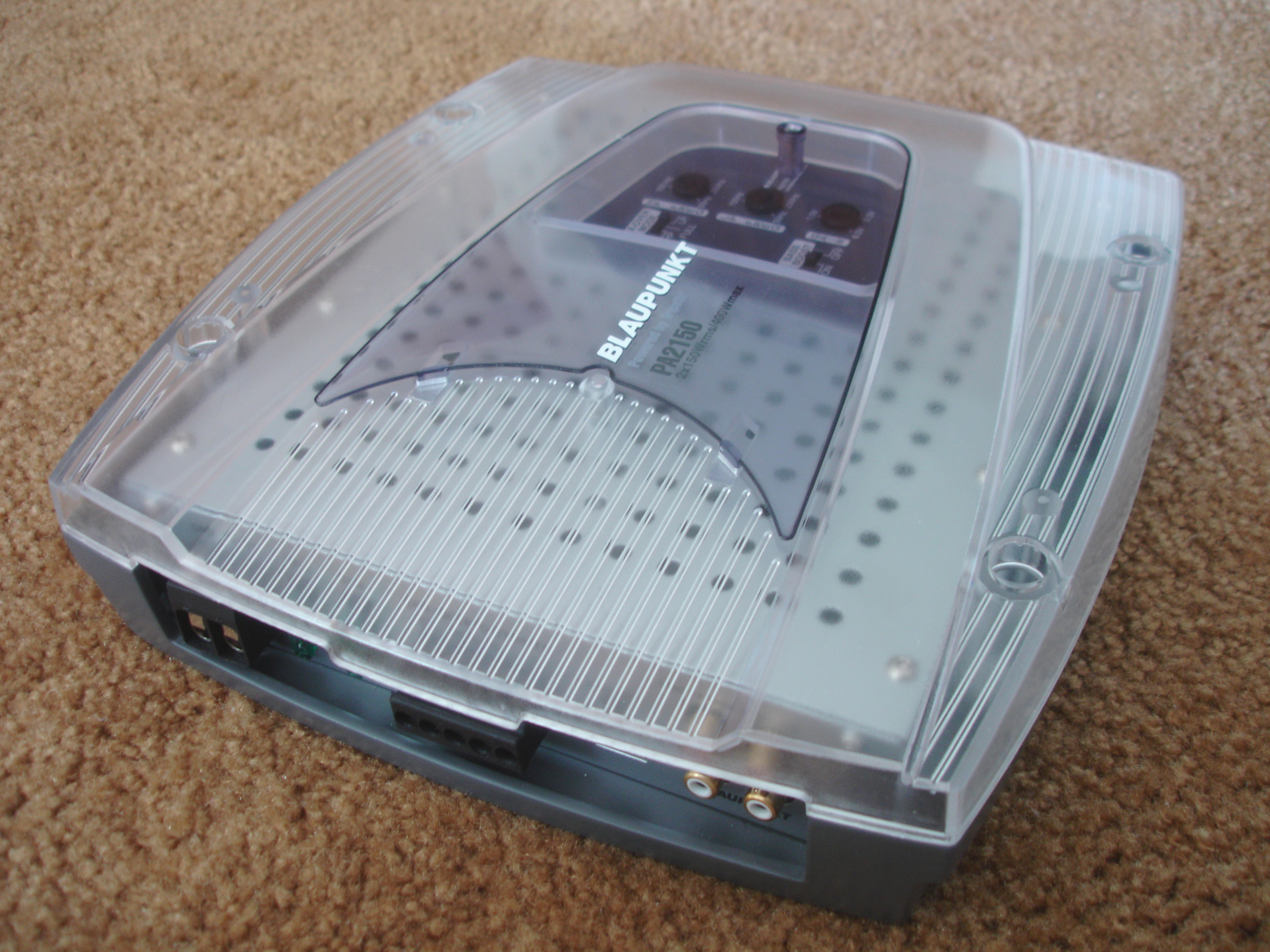
PA2150 Class T amplifier

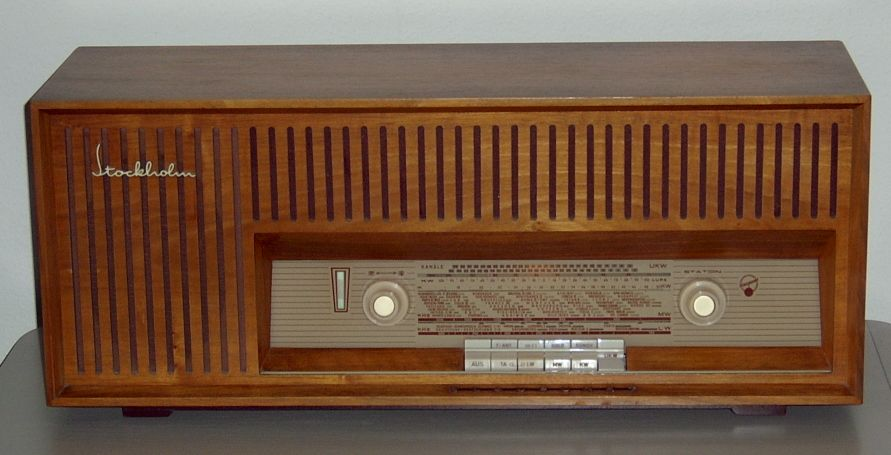
Blaupunkt-Stockholm Radio (1963)

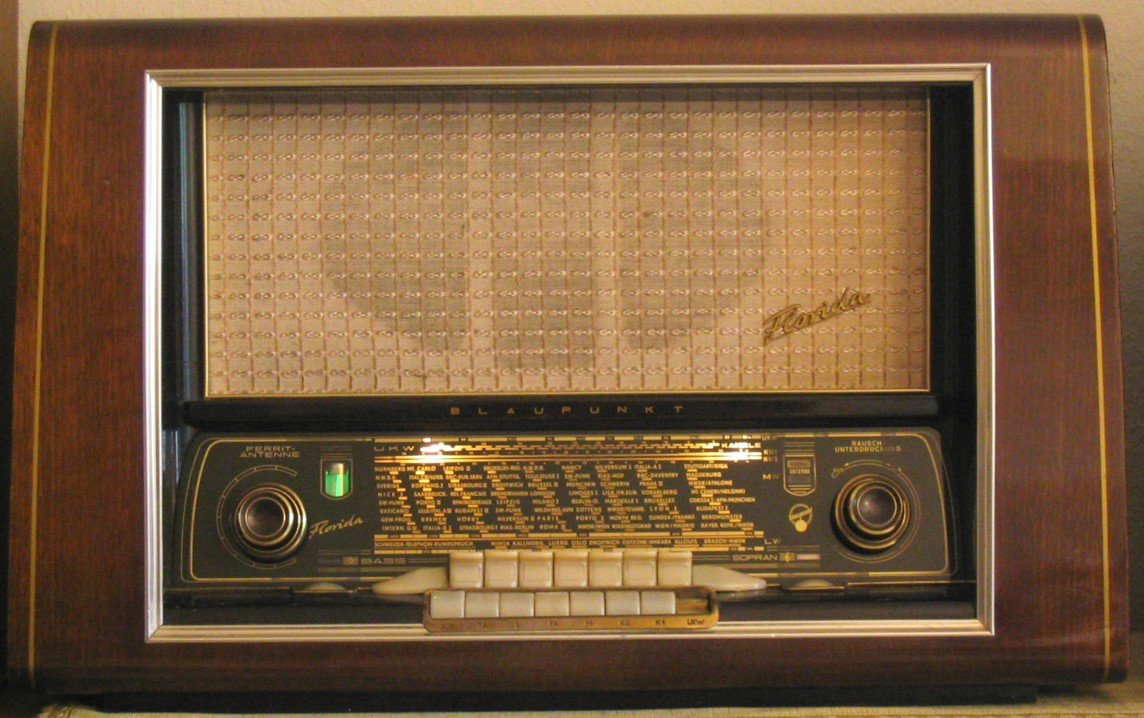
Blaupunkt Radio (1954)

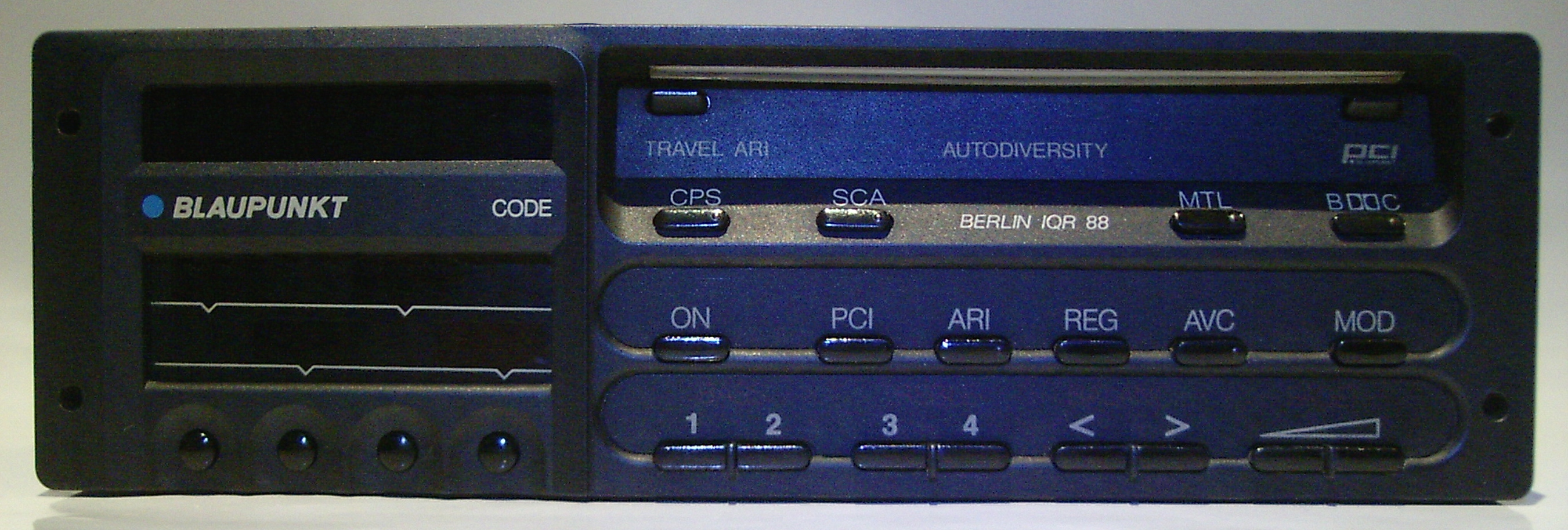
Blaupunkt Berlin Radio IQR 88

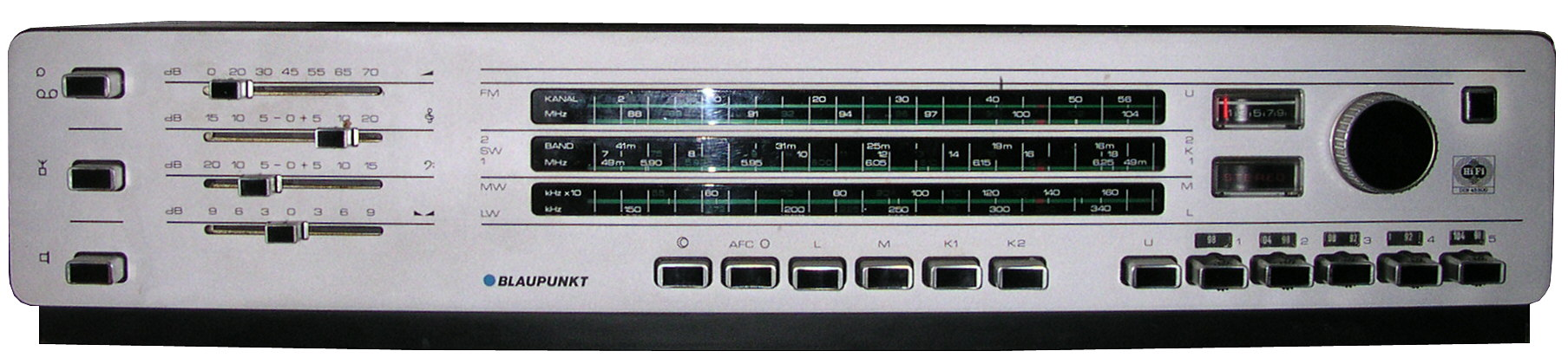
Blaupunkt Radio Receiver

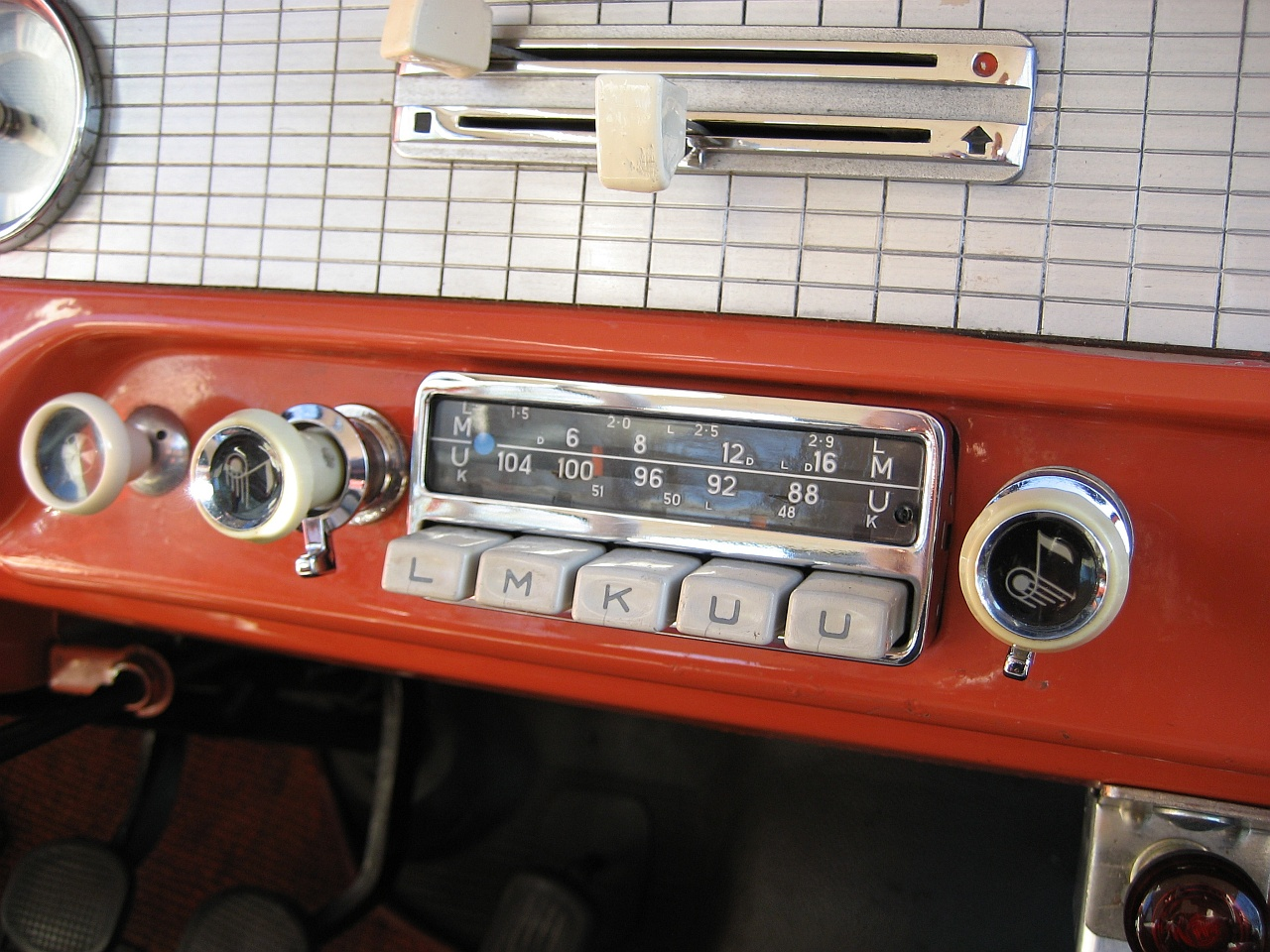
Radio Blaupunkt Köln (1958)

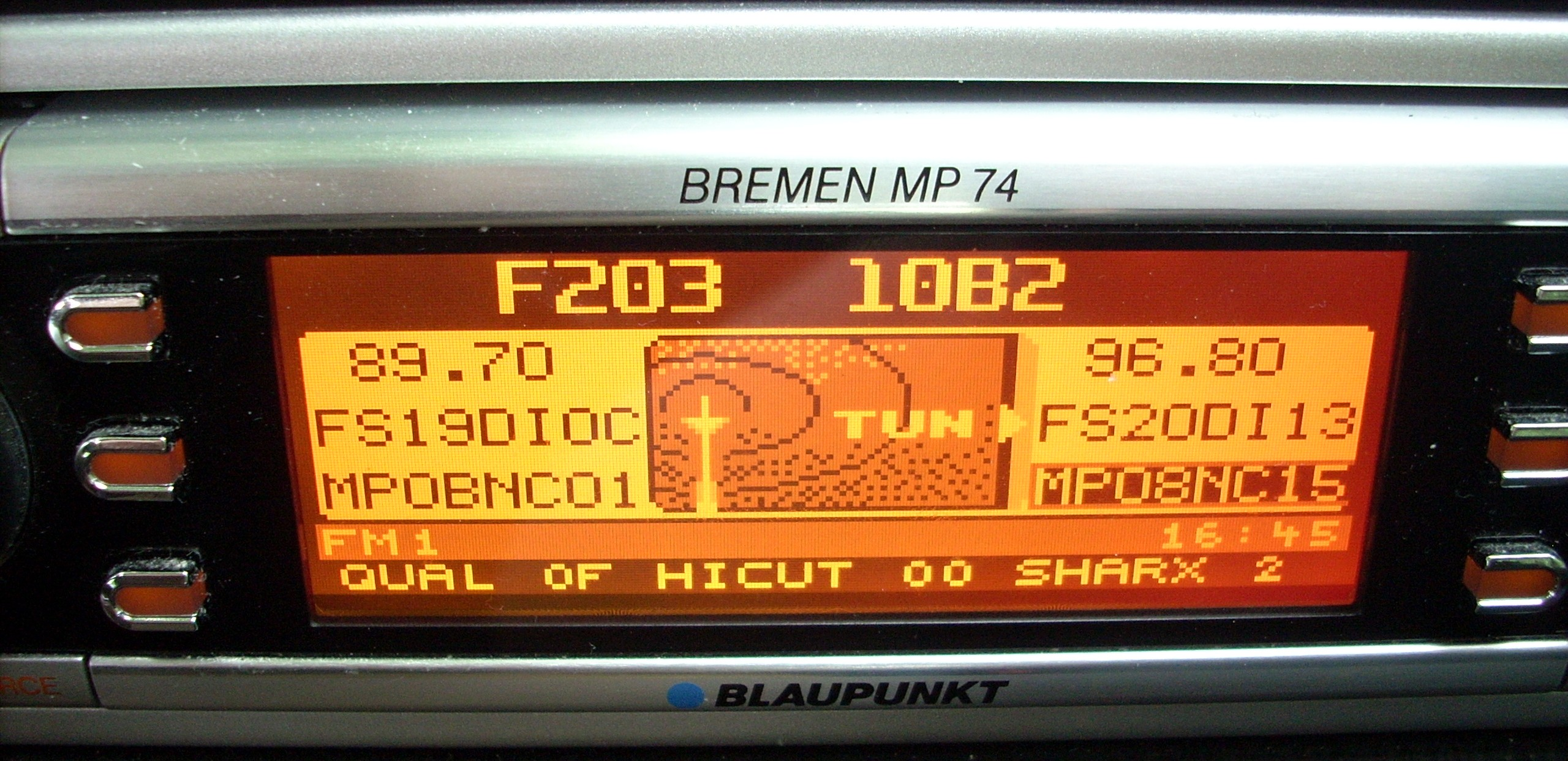
Blaupunkt Bremen MP74

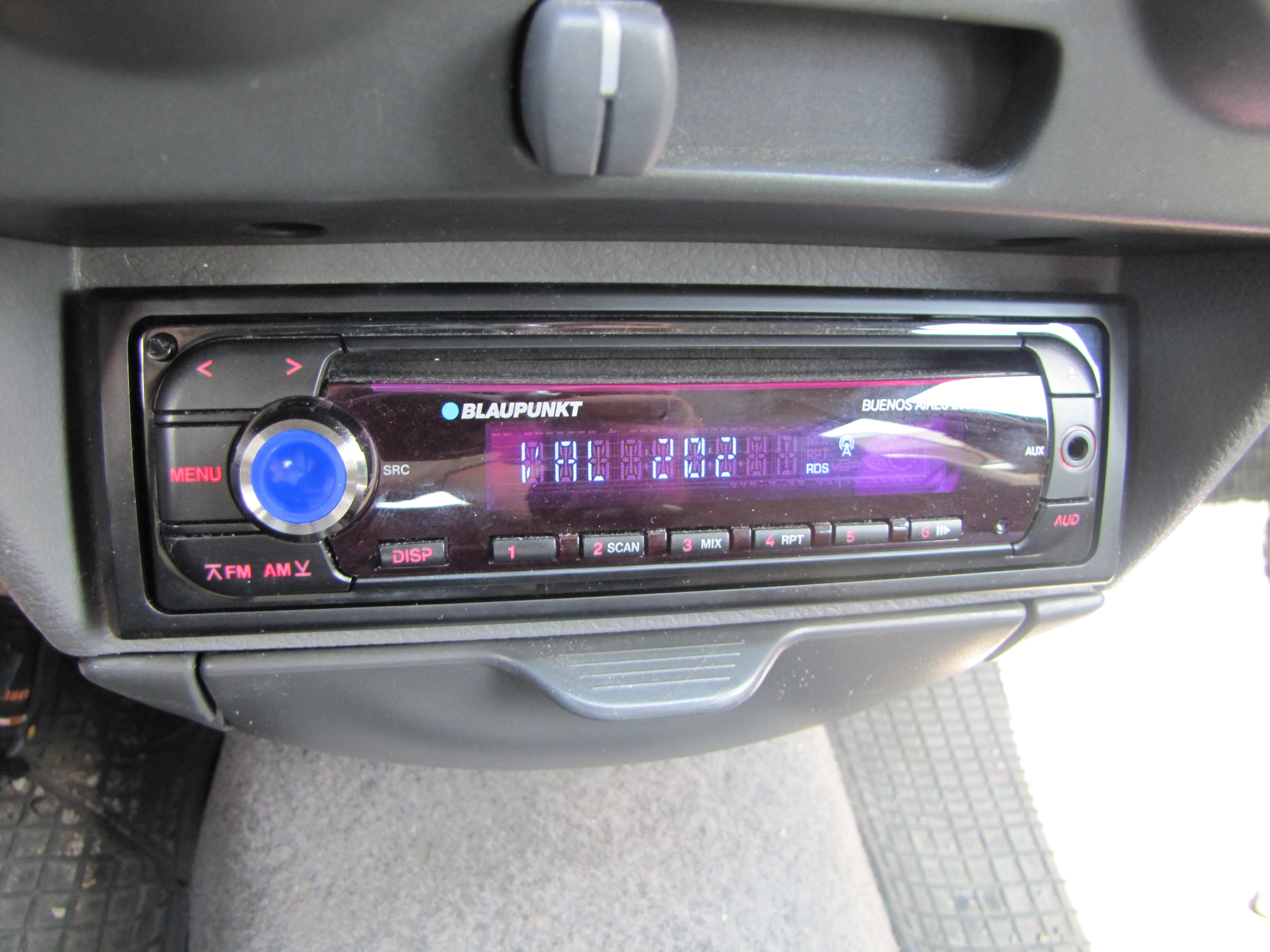
Blaupunkt Buenos Aires 200 head unit (car radio)

Front panel of the BMW E46 Business CD radio made by Blaupunkt

== Sources ==
- Blaupunkt company profile
- Bosch BLAUPUNKT HISTORY
- TV 1950
- Radio 1963
- Radio 1938
