= Wittmoor Measurement and Reception Station =

Coordinates: 53°37′38″N 9°43′26″E

The Wittmoor Measurement and Reception Station in Holm, Pinneberg district, northern Germany, is an equipment of the Norddeutscher Rundfunk (North German broadcasting company) for the supervision of the broadcasting frequencies in the southern Pinneberg district and the western area of Hamburg. Also, it accommodates a big archive of sound carriers which is accommodated in several buildings and serves for the broadcast of the radio program of N-Joy on 95.6 MHz with 200 W ERP.

The reception aerials and broadcasting aerials of the station are on a 118-metre (387 ft) high, guyed lattice steel mast with a square cross-section which replaced an older 80-metre (260 ft) high guyed lattice steel mast which was dismantled, after the erection of the new mast. Also, there is a dish aerial on the station area for satellite reception with approx. 2.5 metres (8 ft 2 in) diameter.

The Wittmoor Measurement and Reception Station publishes annually an official frequency list of the radio stations, the such called Wittmoor List, maintained up to June 2018 by the Institut für Rundfunktechnik (IRT).
