= Giditraffic =

GidiTraffic (stylized as ‘GIDITRAFFIC') is a Nigerian social information service established on 23 September 2011. It began as a crowdsourced traffic-information service on Twitter, providing real-time reports about road conditions in Lagos, Nigeria. The service subsequently expanded beyond traffic reporting to include information concerning security, emergencies, public events, locations, services and other public-interest matters."You Tweet! "I'm not a surveillance camera hanging under a chopper," says @Gidi_Traffic". YNaija. 25 November 2011.

== History ==
GidiTraffic was established on 23 September 2011 as a Twitter-based service intended to provide real-time information about traffic conditions in Lagos. Its operating model relied on members of the public submitting reports from their locations, which were then redistributed through the GidiTraffic account."You Tweet! "I'm not a surveillance camera hanging under a chopper," says @Gidi_Traffic". YNaija. 25 November 2011.

The service was initially focused on traffic information for motorists and other road users. It subsequently developed into a broader crowdsourced information service in which users could submit inquiries and receive responses from other members of the service’s community."GIDITRAFFIC". GidiTraffic.

In 2012, GidiTraffic was described by the African Women Power Network as a social-media service providing traffic updates, alternative routes and security reports, while also planning to expand its crowdsourced information to areas including health, employment and events."Gidi Traffic Uses Social Media for Social Good". African Women Power Network. 23 August 2012.

== Crowdsourcing and public information ==
GidiTraffic’s operating model is based on crowdsourcing. Users submit information from their locations, which can then be distributed to the wider audience through the service’s social-media channels and other platforms."GIDITRAFFIC". GidiTraffic.

The service’s use expanded beyond routine traffic reports. During the Occupy Nigeria protests in January 2012, GidiTraffic’s platform was used to distribute information submitted from locations affected by the demonstrations. The service has also been described in contemporary reporting as providing information concerning accidents, security, jobs and other public inquiries."'Power to the people' apps". Pulse Nigeria.

The service’s crowdsourced approach was also used to provide information about traffic delays, alternative routes and other conditions affecting commuters. Technology publication TechCabal described GidiTraffic as a crowdsourced traffic-information service that began on Twitter before expanding to a mobile application."Avoid The Go-Slow With These Traffic Monitoring Applications". TechCabal. 1 July 2015.

== Mobile applications ==
In 2012, GidiTraffic partnered with telecommunications company Nokia to develop a mobile application for its traffic-information service. The application was made available for Nokia Asha devices."'Power to the people' apps". Pulse Nigeria.

The GidiTraffic mobile application subsequently expanded to additional platforms. A version for Nokia Lumia smartphones using Windows Phone 8 was launched in September 2013."Giditraffic". Wikipedia.

The Android version of the service allowed users to submit and receive traffic information and other community reports. Its features included a timeline of community reports, replies to posts and the ability to share reports through other communication platforms."GIDITRAFFIC for Android". GidiTraffic.

== Expansion beyond traffic ==
Although traffic reporting remained a central part of GidiTraffic’s activities, the service expanded into a broader information platform.

Pulse Nigeria reported that users could continue to submit inquiries through Twitter and that responses were crowdsourced from other users. It also reported that the service’s Android and Windows applications included security updates and job-related information."'Power to the people' apps". Pulse Nigeria.

The Android application documentation described the service as allowing users to obtain traffic information and search for information concerning jobs, stores, labour, people and places, as well as submit general inquiries."GIDITRAFFIC for Android". GidiTraffic.

== Commercial development ==
GidiTraffic developed a commercial operation alongside its social-media presence.

In 2019, ThisDay reported that GidiTraffic had a business-development operation and commercial relationships with a number of Nigerian companies. The report identified companies including GTBank, Zenith Bank, Dangote, NNPC and Pepsi among companies that had advertised through the service."Bethia Idoko: Constantly Pushing Boundaries". THISDAY. 3 May 2019.

== GIDI Live ==
‘’‘GIDI Live’’’ is a subsequent digital platform associated with GidiTraffic. It is designed as a location-based local information and community application, with a focus on local alerts, news and neighbourhood information.

The platform extends the crowdsourced-information model used by GidiTraffic beyond traffic reporting, allowing users to share and discover information associated with their local communities.

== Social-media presence ==
Twitter, subsequently renamed X, has been the principal social-media platform associated with GidiTraffic.

In 2020, the International Centre for Investigative Reporting described @Gidi_Traffic as an information hub with more than 1.7 million followers on Twitter."Page 1962". International Centre for Investigative Reporting.

The account has subsequently grown to more than 1.9 million followers.

== Recognition ==
In early 2012, GidiTraffic was nominated for a Shorty Award in the Life-Saving Hero category. The nomination brought international attention to the service, including coverage by international news organizations."Gidi Traffic Uses Social Media for Social Good". African Women Power Network. 23 August 2012.

GidiTraffic was also recognized at The Future Awards Africa in 2012. Contemporary coverage lists GidiTraffic among the nominees and winners associated with the Best Use of New Media category."The Future Awards winners spotlight: Gidi Traffic's Kaptin Idoko speaks". YNaija. 9 July 2013.

The service’s early development and recognition received coverage from Nigerian and international media, including reporting associated with its Shorty Award nomination and its use of social media for public information.

== See also ==
- Crowdsourcing
- Citizen journalism
- Social media in Nigeria
- Traffic reporting
