= Autofahrer-Rundfunk-Informationssystem =

Autofahrer-Rundfunk-Informationssystem (ARI, German for: Automotive-Driver's-Broadcasting-Information) was a system for indicating the presence of traffic information in FM broadcasts used by the German ARD network of FM radio stations from 1974. Developed jointly by IRT and Blaupunkt, it indicated the presence of traffic announcements through manipulation of the 57kHz subcarrier of the station's FM signal.

ARI was rendered obsolete by the more modern Radio Data System and the ARD stopped broadcasting ARI signals on March 1, 2005.

== Functionality description ==
=== SK signal ===
The SK signal is actually the 57 kHz subcarrier that is transmitted by the ARI-compliant FM station for this functionality. This frequency, like the RDS subcarrier frequency is chosen because it is the third harmonic of the 19 kHz pilot tone used in the FM-stereo transmission standard. An easy way to understand that is that this frequency is the 19 kHz pilot tone multiplied by 3.

An ARI-equipped radio would illuminate an indicator lamp to show that this function was in force. Most such radios would use this function further to help users search for ARI broadcasts. In the Radio Data System environment, the TP signal is equivalent to this basic function.

The basic method implemented on an analog receiver would be a switch usually marked SDK or VF. Radios that used the "classic" mechanical push-button preset system would have one of these buttons set aside as the VF switch. If this switch was on, the radio would mute unless it was tuned into a station that transmitted this signal.

If the radio was a digitally-tuned receiver, this switch usually engaged an "ARI-seek" mode which had the radio seek for any ARI station if it was out of range of the currently-tuned ARI station.

=== DK signal ===
This function, which is superseded by the RDS TA function, was tied in with the broadcasting studio and would be triggered whenever the traffic-announcement jingle was played. A 125 Hz tone would be modulated on the 57 kHz ARI subcarrier tone while this was happening.

A radio that used a "DK" switch, often part of the "SDK" or "VF" switch, was placed into "traffic-priority" mode. It would pick up on this signal and come out of a muted state or cut over a tape or CD that was playing and play the announcement at a fixed volume level.

There was the ability to switch off such announcements on these sets if the driver found a particular announcement irrelevant or it ran on for too long, but it was not easily explained to people new to the system. This was also confusing because a lot of cheaper implementations used a mechanical toggle switch to engage / disengage ARI mode and it was hard to simply use this switch simply to reset the system.

=== BK signal ===
This function was based on one of six tones that was in this same subcarrier and was reserved for high-end car radios. These were referred to as A, B, C, D, E and F; and they worked as a crude way of machine-based geocoding for Germany's broadcast areas. The set would indicate the current zone that it was in rather than using an "SK" indicator whenever it was on an ARI station. As well, the user could control ARI search behavior based on the current zone, a user-nominated zone such as the neighboring zone or any ARI station in any zone.

== Attempts to deploy ARI in the U.S. ==
Blaupunkt even made attempts to roll it out into the US market since 1982 by gaining support from selected FM broadcasters in the big US cities, but it did not catch on. Besides, they were the only company to put ARI-equipped sets on the U.S. marketplace, as a way of differentiating their product from others. There was talk of encouraging other manufacturers to sell ARI-equipped car radios to the U.S., but there was no action even though other manufacturers would roll out ARI-equipped radios to Germany.

== Attempts to deploy ARI in Canada ==
ARI was introduced in Toronto, Canada, around the same time as the U.S. CHFI was the station designated for such broadcasts, and ads for new Blaupunkt car stereos announced it, but just like in the U.S., ARI did not seem to catch on.
