= Institut für Rundfunktechnik =

Research centre of broadcasters

The Institut für Rundfunktechnik GmbH (IRT) (Institute for Broadcasting Technology Ltd.) was a research centre of German broadcasters (ARD / ZDF / DLR), Austria's broadcaster (ORF) and the Swiss public broadcaster (SRG / SSR). It was responsible for research on broadcasting technology. It was founded in 1956 and was located in Munich, Germany.

They invented or were influential in the research, development and field-testing of important standards such as ARI, RDS, VPS, DSR, DAB and DVB-T.

Institut für Rundfunktechnik was a founding member of the Hybrid Broadcast Broadband TV (HbbTV) consortium of broadcasting and Internet industry companies that established an open European standard (called HbbTV) for hybrid set-top boxes for the reception of broadcast TV and broadband multimedia applications with a single user interface.

In 2020, ZDF and then other supporters indicated that they planned to withdraw from the organization, so the IRT was closed by the end of 2020.

== Former members ==
- Bayerischer Rundfunk
- Deutsche Welle
- Deutschlandradio
- Hessischer Rundfunk
- Mitteldeutscher Rundfunk
- Norddeutscher Rundfunk
- Österreichischer Rundfunk
- Radio Bremen
- Rundfunk Berlin-Brandenburg
- Saarländischer Rundfunk
- SRG SSR
- Südwestrundfunk
- Westdeutscher Rundfunk Köln
- ZDF

== See also ==
- BBC Research & Development
- High Com FM (researched and field-trialed by IRT between 1979 and 1984)
- Wittmoor List (maintained by IRT up to June 2018)
- European Broadcasting Union (EBU)
- International Telecommunication Union (ITU)
- DVB Project
- WorldDAB
- Public broadcasting
- Teletext
- Fernmeldetechnisches Zentralamt (FTZ)
- Rundfunk- und Fernsehtechnisches Zentralamt (RFZ)
- Informations-Verarbeitungs-Zentrum (IVZ)
