= HEARO =

Emergency management tool

The HEARO Local Alert Receiver was an emergency management tool to relay and display informational text messages in English, Spanish, French and German using RDS technology. It notified local residents in the event of an emergency within a matter of seconds. HEARO carried NOAA weather warnings and other public safety text alerts, using FM radio infrastructure with a 60-hour battery life, HEARO was able to work when electricity, telephone and Internet were unavailable. viaRadio Corporation of Melbourne, Florida manufactured and distributed HEARO receivers.

HEARO claimed to be the only publicly available implementation of any component of a Common Alerting Protocol-based alert message transfer system. It can also provide NOAA Weather Radio updates.

== Active systems ==
Indialantic, Florida adopted the HEARO system after its volunteer fire department experimented with it for a year. Indialantic officials wanted an effective method to alert its residents to emergencies, particularly during hurricane season when the only means of evacuating the barrier island is over one of the causeways. The system is also in use in Palm Bay, Florida.

Leon County Schools in Tallahassee, Florida adopted the HEARO system in 2008. By placing the HEARO receivers in schools and all district facilities, LCS planned to inform the schools' administration of lock downs, weather emergencies and other pertinent information. viaRadio worked with other school systems around the country including Florida's Brevard Public Schools for more than a year.

The Caribbean island Montserrat utilized the HEARO to alert residents of volcanic activity and other hazards. Coordinated by the Disaster Management Co-ordination Agency (DMCA), with assistance from the Royal Montserrat Defence Force and the Royal Montserrat Police Force, the local disaster agency started the distribution of HEARO Local Alert Receivers to residents in the most vulnerable areas. The goal of the program was to place the advanced early warning radio in every home, business, school and other critical agencies on island.

The University of Central Florida in Orlando, Florida utilized the HEARO radio system as one of the methods to distribute emergency alerts to campus personnel. "HEARO Radios are also placed throughout the campus in high-occupancy locations."

== See also ==
- Emergency management
- Common Alerting Protocol
- NOAA Weather Radio
- Emergency population warning
- Radio Data System
