= Radio Data System =

Communications protocol standard in FM radio broadcasts

- Radio Broadcast Data System
- The RDS logo
- Status: Active
- Year started: 1984; 42 years ago
- Committee: International Electrotechnical Commission

Radio Data System (RDS) is a communications protocol standard for embedding small amounts of digital information in conventional FM radio broadcasts. RDS standardizes several types of information transmitted, including time, station identification and program information.

The standard began as a project of the European Broadcasting Union (EBU), but has since become an international standard of the International Electrotechnical Commission (IEC). Radio Broadcast Data System (RBDS) is the official name used for the U.S. version of RDS. The two standards are only slightly different, with receivers able to work with either system with only minor inconsistencies in the displayed data. RDS is only used on analog stations. The HD Radio equivalent is Program-associated data (PAD), now called Program service data (PSD).

Both versions carry data at 1,187.5 bits per second (about 1.2 kbit/s) on a 57 kHz subcarrier, so there are exactly 48 cycles of subcarrier during every data bit. The RBDS/RDS subcarrier was set to the third harmonic of the 19 kHz FM stereo pilot tone to minimize interference and intermodulation between the data signal, the stereo pilot and the 38 kHz DSB-SC stereo difference signal. (The stereo difference signal extends up 38 kHz + 15 kHz = 53 kHz, leaving 4 kHz for the lower sideband of the RDS signal.) The data is sent with an error correction code, but receivers may choose to use it only for error detection without correction. RDS defines many features including how private (in-house) or other undefined features can be "packaged" in unused program groups.

== Development ==
RDS was inspired by the development of the Autofahrer-Rundfunk-Informationssystem (ARI) in Germany by the Institut für Rundfunktechnik (IRT) and the radio manufacturer Blaupunkt. ARI used a 57-kHz subcarrier to indicate the presence of traffic information in an FM radio broadcast.

The EBU Technical Committee launched a project at its 1974 Paris meeting to develop a technology with similar purposes to ARI, but which was more flexible and which would enable automated retuning of a receiver where a broadcast network transmitted the same radio programme on a number of different frequencies. The modulation system was based on that used in a Swedish paging system and the baseband coding was a new design, mainly developed by the British Broadcasting Corporation (BBC) and the IRT. The EBU issued the first RDS specification in 1984.

Of the three broadcasting partners of the EBU, the BBC were reportedly pursuing the application of RDS technology most enthusiastically and sought to attract bids from manufacturers to make a "BBC-accredited radio" supporting RDS features. Having received no manufacturer interest, however, the corporation engaged designers at Kinneir Dufort to produce a prototype showcasing these features. This prototype, unveiled in 1989, incorporated a liquid-crystal display capable of showing images such as weather maps, accompanied by "a light pen with which the radio can be programmed from barcodes", these barcodes encoding programme information, and supported detachable modules, of which a cassette player module and a printer module were developed. Despite reluctance to develop screen-based functionality that might bring RDS into competition with television, the utility of being able to print out information such as weather maps or even advertising was regarded as potentially interesting to both radio and television manufacturers alike.

Enhancements to the alternative frequencies functionality were added to the standard and it was subsequently published as a European Committee for Electrotechnical Standardization (CENELEC) standard in 1990.

In 1992 the U.S. National Radio Systems Committee issued the North American version of the RDS standard, called the Radio Broadcast Data System. The CENELEC standard was updated in 1992 with the addition of Traffic Message Channel and in 1998 with Open Data Applications and, in 2000, RDS was published worldwide as IEC standard 62106.

=== RDS2 ===
The RDS-Forum (Geneva/CH) decided at its annual meeting (8–9 June 2015) in Glion/Montreux to bring the new standard RDS2 on the way. The standard will be created in close collaboration with U.S. colleagues from NRSC RBDS-Subcommittee and should offer a unified platform for FM broadcasting and data services worldwide.

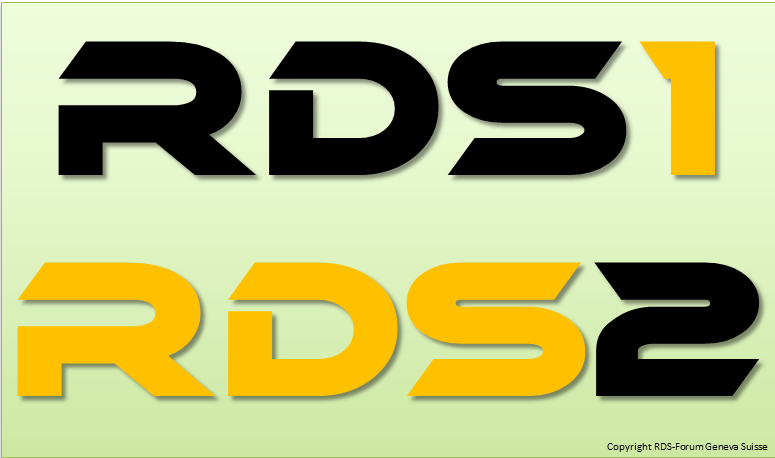
Logo for RDS1 and RDS2

Key features

- Seamless support for frequencies from 64 MHz to 108 MHz (AF, EON)
- New character coding: UTF-8 (old EBU Charset remains for compatibility mode for the old 0A/2A Groups).
- New ODA (Open Data Applications) handling, "B" groups are assigned as signalling group to the "A" groups.
- Long PS-Name, up to 32 byte with UTF-8 character set. (Indian, Chinese, Arabic, and more)
- RadioText (eRT) 128 byte long with UTF-8 character set.
- Increased capacity from 11.4 up to 57 "A"-groups per second. (2,109 bit/s. net capacity with the single modulation-type multiple subcarriers (SMMS) technology)
- Graphical RadioText – supports HTML/CSS templates (for smartphones, car radios, computers/tablets)
- Supports return channel over gRT if the receiver has IP or SMS capability.
- Broadcaster's graphical logo – a maximum 4 kilobyte picture (JPEG, PNG, or GIF)
- Hybrid Radio feature (partly based on Radio France development)

== Content and implementation ==
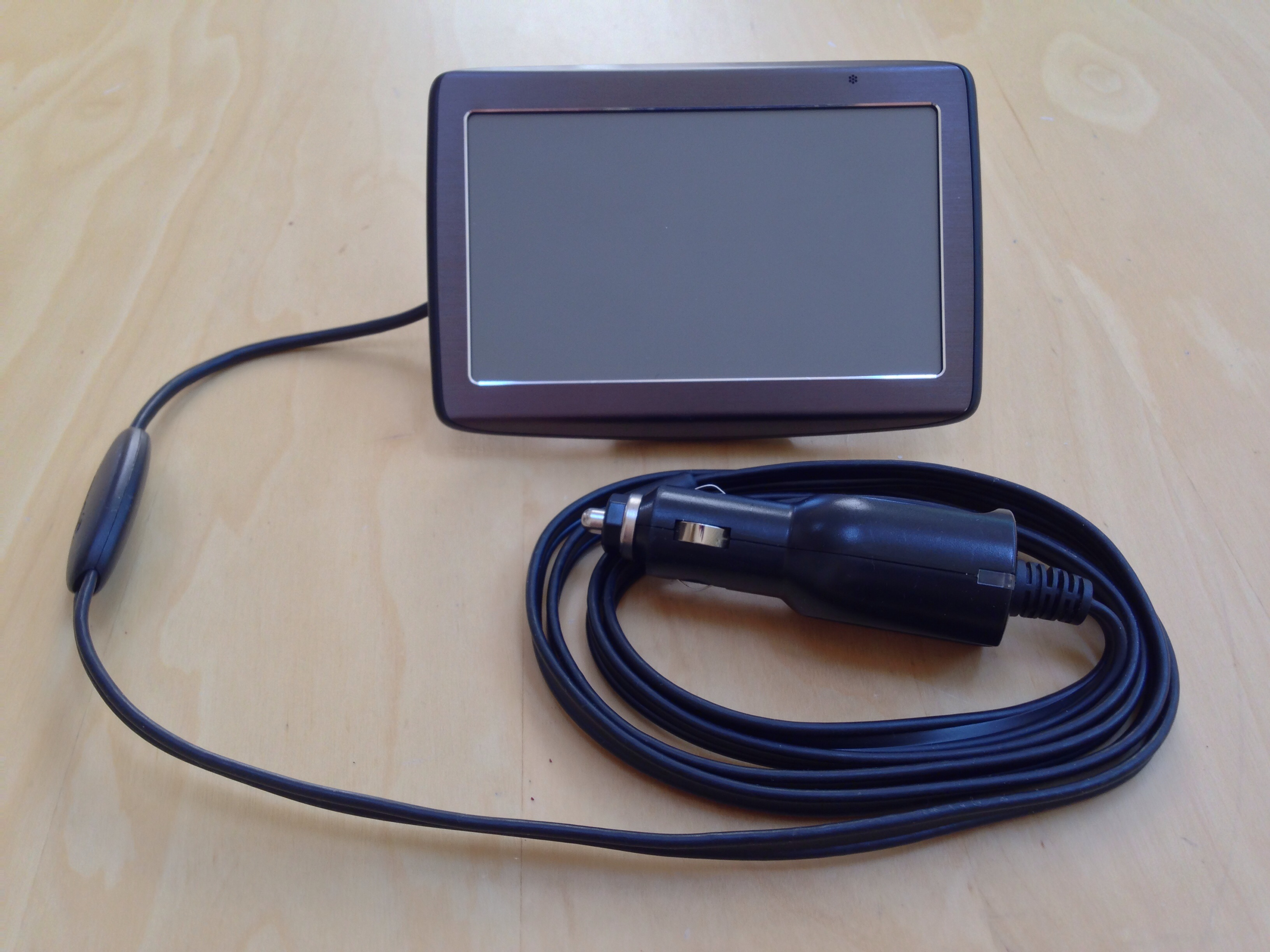
A Radio Data System – Traffic Message Channel (RDS-TMC) receiver (left) attached to a TomTom navigation system to integrate real-time traffic data into the navigation.

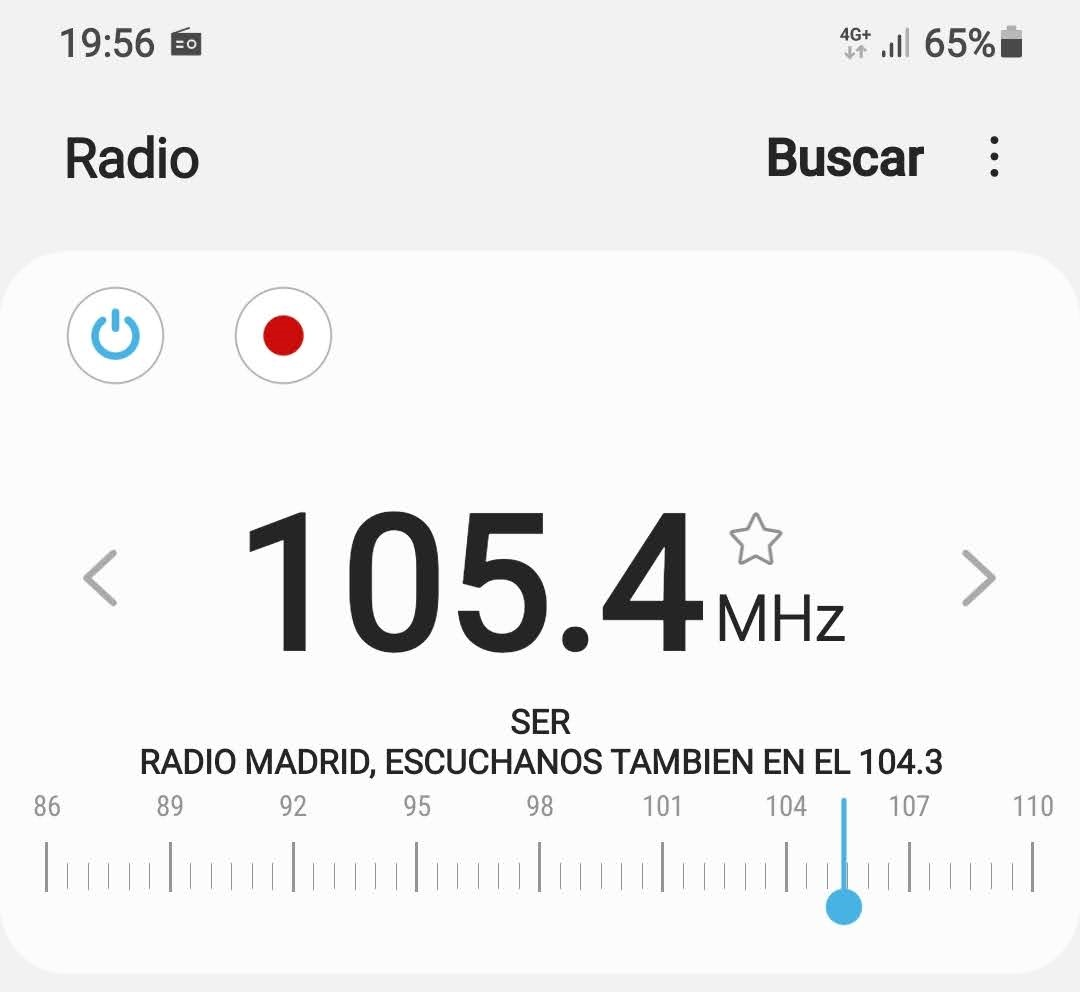
Radio Data System display of an FM Radio station from Spain.

The following information fields are normally contained in the RDS data:

AF (alternative frequencies list)
This provides the receiver with a list of frequencies that allows a receiver to re-tune to a different frequency providing the same station when the first signal becomes too weak (e.g., when moving out of range). Before performing the switch, a radio will check for a matching PI code to ensure the AF is the same station. This is often used in car stereo systems, allowing the head unit to automatically tune into the stronger signal on the move, optionally with the same regional code (so that, in the case of national broadcasting stations, the user can keep listening to the original radio program).
CT (clock time and date)
Can synchronize a clock in the receiver or the main clock in a car. Due to transmission vagaries, CT can only be accurate to within 100 ms of UTC. CT is not usually transmitted if a broadcaster has no way to regularly synchronise the clock within the RDS encoder. Car radios are more likely to use GPS as a time source if a satellite navigation system is fitted.
EON (enhanced other networks information)
Informs the receiver about other networks or stations, linked to the one being listened to, for dynamically changing data such as the TA flag turning on for a particular station of the network in a particular moment due to a traffic programme being broadcast, and automatically and temporarily allows the radio to tune into that station.
PI (programme identification)
This is the unique 4 character hexadecimal code that identifies the station. Every station in a country should use a unique 3 character code with the correct country prefix character. In the US, PI is determined by applying a formula to the station's call sign, or randomly assigned by the NRSC to FM translators (which have a longer call sign, making them incompatible with the formula). The PI code is the most important RDS parameter and the most frequently transmitted within the RDS data structure. The RDS standard for non US use defines country codes for all countries so that nowhere with common borders has the same code. This removes the need to coordinate PI codes between different countries. Any transmission that carries the same code is considered by receivers to be the same and can be switched to as an alternative frequency to improve reception (even if it is not specifically listed as an alternative frequency). PI codes can be generically linked. A PI code is generically linked if the first, third and fourth nibbles are the same. Generic linking is typically done by radio stations in different areas that are related in some way. Receivers (especially those in vehicles) may have a setting called 'Regional' which when activated allows the radio to switch to another generically linked station. PI codes are normally static (i.e. do not change). However, in the UK some networks use dynamic PI codes where the second nibble changes (to a generically linked code). The national broadcaster Classic FM for example does this. The intention of this is to prevent radios retuning during commercial breaks where each transmitter carries a different set of commercials.

PS (programme service name)
This is simply an eight-character static display that represents the call letters or station identity name. Most RDS capable receivers display this information and, if the station is stored in the receiver's presets, will cache this information with the PI code, frequency and other details associated with that preset. In some countries, stations use the PS to dynamically send other information. This is prohibited in some countries and was not its intended use within the RDS system.
PTY (programme type)
This coding of up to 31 pre-defined programme types (e.g., in Europe: PTY1 News, PTY6 Drama, PTY11 Rock music) allows users to find similar programming by genre. PTY31 is reserved for emergency announcements in the event of natural disasters or other major calamities.
REG (regional)
This is mainly used in countries where national broadcasters run "region-specific" programming such as regional opt-outs on some of their transmitters. This functionality allows the user to "lock-down" the set to their current region or let the radio tune into other region-specific programming as they move into the other region. See the description of Program identification code below for further information.

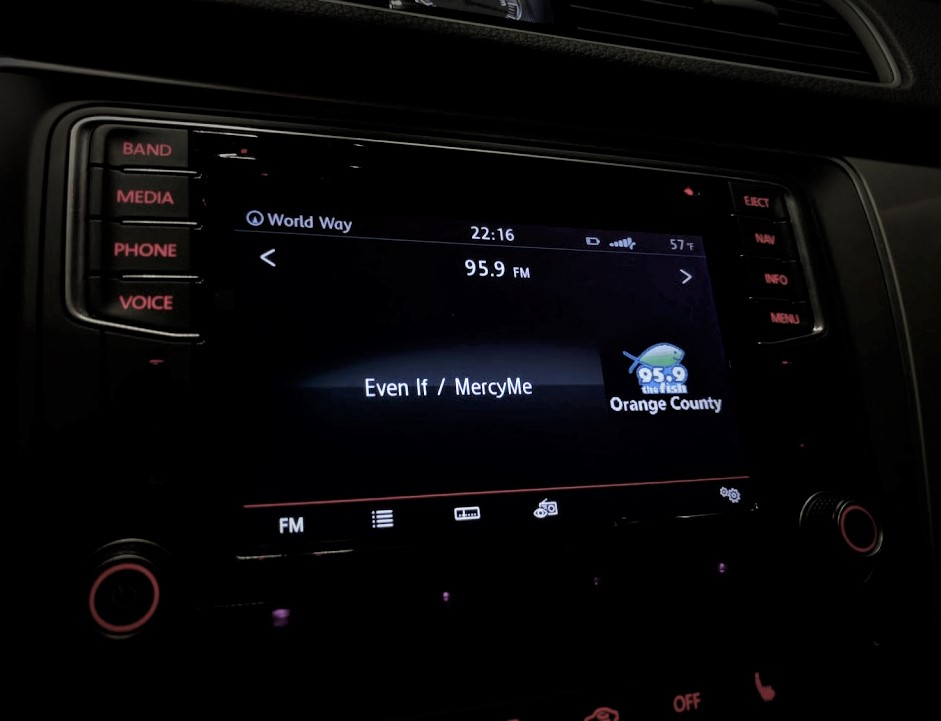
An example of RT RDS on Los Angeles' KFSH-FM

RT (radio text)
This function allows a radio station to transmit a 64 (or less commonly 32) character free-form text message that can be either static (such as station slogans) or in sync with the programming (such as the title and artist of the currently playing song).
RT+ (radio text plus)
An enhancement of the original RT which allows Artist, Title and some other metadata to be sent to receivers.
TA, TP (traffic announcement, traffic programme)
The receiver can often be set to pay special attention to this flag (taking advantage of the EON linkage if it's available) and, for example, pause a CD or retune to receive a traffic bulletin. The TP flag is used to allow the user to find only those stations that regularly broadcast traffic bulletins whereas the TA flag is used to signal an actual traffic bulletin in progress, with radio units perhaps performing other actions such as pausing a CD/MP3 (so the radio can be heard) or raising the volume during the traffic bulletin.
TMC (traffic message channel)
Digitally encoded traffic information. Not all RDS equipment supports this, but it is often available for automotive navigation systems. In many countries only encrypted traffic data is broadcast, and so an appropriate decoder, possibly tied to a subscription service, is required to use the traffic data. The subscription is often paid by the vehicle manufacturer and is therefore transparent to the user.
US NRSC FM Translator Announcements
The National Radio Systems Committee has introduced a unique Radio Data System Program Identification code for US FM translators. One type of metadata transmitted by RDS subcarrier is the PI code, which is used by the receiver to uniquely identify the audio program being broadcast by the FM station. In the U.S., the PI code has historically been derived from a radio station's call sign, which can become complicated when used in conjunction with FM translators. A new algorithm just for FM translators has been created that assigns a unique PI code to each FM translator. This algorithm has been implemented using a web-based tool and a list of all known PI codes for all FM translators in the US.

== RDS support ==
As far as implementation is concerned, most car stereos will support at least AF, EON, REG, PS and TA/TP.

- More expensive car stereos will offer TMC, RT and / or PTY, perhaps with "NEWS" override.
- Home systems, especially hi-fi receivers, will mainly support functions like PS, RT and PTY.

There are a growing number of RDS implementations in portable audio and navigation devices thanks to lower-priced, small-footprint solutions.

== RDS compatibility ==
The RDS sub-carrier at 57 kHz occupies ±2 kHz of the composite spectrum which in theory keeps it above the upper cutoff of the stereo subcarrier at 53 kHz. However the 53 kHz cutoff is entirely dependent on the performance of the 15 kHz low pass filters used before the stereo encoder. In older equipment, these filters were only designed to protect the 19 kHz pilot and sometimes did not provide sufficient protection to the RDS subcarrier when a significant amount of stereo information was present. In this situation, stereo enhancement devices combined with aggressive audio processing could render the RDS subcarrier unreceivable. In some modern audio processors the 15 kHz low pass filters have a 16.5 kHz cutoff. This can also degrade the reception of RDS.

Composite clipping systems may also degrade the RDS sub-carrier because of the harmonics created by the clipping. More modern composite clippers include filtering to protect the RDS subcarrier.

The RDS subcarrier typically uses 2–4 kHz of carrier deviation. Therefore, the deviation available for the program material is reduced by this amount, assuming the usual 75 kHz deviation limit is not exceeded.

== Program types ==
The following table lists the RDS and RBDS (North American) program type (PTY) codes and their meanings:

Program type (PTY) code assignment
PTY code	RDS program type	RBDS program type	PTY code	RDS program type	RBDS program type
0	No programme type or undefined		16	Weather	Rhythm and blues
1	News	News	17	Finance	Soft rhythm and blues
2	Current affairs	Information	18	Children's programmes	Language
3	Information	Sports	19	Social affairs	Religious music
4	Sport	Talk	20	Religion	Religious talk
5	Education	Rock	21	Phone-in	Personality
6	Drama	Classic rock	22	Travel	Public
7	Culture	Adult hits	23	Leisure	College
8	Science	Soft rock	24	Jazz music	Spanish Talk
9	Varied	Top 40	25	Country music	Spanish Music
10	Pop music	Country	26	National music	Hip hop
11	Rock music	Oldies	27	Oldies music	Unassigned
12	Easy listening	Soft music	28	Folk music	Unassigned
13	Light classical	Nostalgia	29	Documentary	Weather
14	Serious classical	Jazz	30	Alarm test	Emergency test
15	Other music	Classical	31	Alarm	Emergency

The PTY codes have undergone several expansions. The first RDS standard only defined 0–15 and 31. The later RBDS standard implemented in the U.S. assigned the same meanings to codes 0, 1 and 31, but made no attempt to match the rest of the original RDS plan and created its own list for codes 2–22 and 30, including commercially important (in the U.S.) radio formats such as top 40, religious, country, jazz and R&B which were not in the RDS list. This included mismatched codes for information. sport, and rock. Later RBDS standards added types 23 (College) and 29 (Weather), while the RDS type code list grew to its current size, importing some types (e.g. jazz and country) from the RDBS list. RDBS types 24–26 were added in April 2011. The code mismatches are mainly a problem for people taking portable radios into or out of North America.

== RDS technical specification ==
The RDS standard as specified in EN 50067:1998 is separated into these sections according to the OSI model. (The network and transport layers are excluded, as this is a unidirectional broadcast standard.)

1. Data channel (Physical layer)
2. Baseband coding (Data-link layer)
3. Message format (Session and presentation layer)

=== Data channel (Physical layer) ===
The physical layer in the standard describes how the bitstream is retrieved from the radio signal. The RDS hardware first demodulates the 57 kHz RDS subcarrier signal to extract a differential Manchester encoded signal which contains both the bit clock and the differentially encoded bitstream. This allows the RDS decoder to tolerate phase inversion of its input.

=== Baseband coding (Data-link layer) ===
At the data link layer, 26 consecutive bits form a "block", consisting of 16 data bits followed by 10 error correction bits. Four blocks make a 104-bit "group". The error correction bits also encode the "offset", or block number within a 4-block group.

The error correction is done using a 10-bit cyclic redundancy check, with polynomial x^{10}+x^{8}+x^{7}+x^{5}+x^{4}+x^{3}+1. (Neither a preset nor post-invert is used, as they are not necessary with a fixed-size data field.) The CRC is also summed with one of five "offset" words which identify the block: A, B, C, C′, or D. Four consecutive blocks (ABCD or ABC′D) make up a "group" of 104 bits (64 data bits + 40 check bits). There are slightly over 11.4 groups transmitted per second.

There is no gap between blocks. The receiver synchronizes to groups and blocks by checking CRCs on each 26 bits until synchronization is achieved. Once synchronized (the offset word is predictable), the code is capable of correcting up to 5-bit burst errors.

This basic modulation and block structure was originally developed for the MBS (radio paging) "mobile search" protocol, with the difference that MBS (or the North American equivalent MMBS "modified MBS") does not use an offset word. To allow the two systems to interoperate (and to allow FM radio stations to transmit RBDS data while maintaining their pager contracts), the RBDS standard defines a sixth all-zero offset word E. Groups of four E blocks may be mixed with RBDS groups, and ignored by RBDS receivers. (Likewise, the RBS offset words are chosen to appear as uncorrectable errors to MBS receivers.)

Data within each block (and group) is transmitted most significant bit first, and thus are numbered from bit 15 (transmitted first) to bit 0 (transmitted last).

The most frequently transmitted information is a 16-bit "program identification" code, identifying the transmitting radio station. Blocks A and C′ always include the PI code; offset C is used when the third block contains something else.

==== Shared structure ====
Block 1 always contains the 16-bit program identifier. The first 11 bits (bits 15–5) of block 2 are also the same in all groups.

The first 4 bits (bits 15–12) of block 2 are the "group type code", which describe the interpretation of the remaining data. Each group type comes "A" and "B" variants, distinguished by the fifth "B" bit (bit 11): If B=0, then the group is 0A through 15A, and contains 5+16+16 = 37 bits of data. If B=1, block 2 contains a PI code (and is encoded with offset word C′), the group is one of 0B through 15B, and contains 21 bits of data.

Within Block 1 and Block 2 are structures that will always be present in both group versions, for fast and responsive identifications. The first block of every group, will always be the program identification code. The second block dedicates the first 4 bits for Application/Group Type.

	Block 1	Block 2				
Block meaning	Program Identification Code	GTYPE	B0	TP	PTY	varies
Bit notation per block	b15 — b0	b15–b12	b11	b10	b9–b5	b4–b0
Fixed meaning per group?	Yes	Yes	Yes	Yes	Yes	No

Meaning of Block 2 Bits

- GTYPE: Group Type
- B0: If B0=0 then Message Group Type A else Type B
- TP: Traffic Program. Indicates this channel includes periodic traffic reports.
- PTY: Program Type (See § Program types.)
- ????: Rest of the bits are group type dependent

===== Message version A =====
	Block 1	Block 2					Block 3	Block 4
Block Meaning	Program Identification Code	Group Type	B0	TP	PTY	APP	Group Specific Payload	Group Specific Payload
Block Payload Bit Value	XXXX XXXX XXXX XXXX	XXXX	0	X	XXXXX	XXXXX	XXXX XXXX XXXX XXXX	XXXX XXXX XXXX XXXX
Offset Value (Sync)	Offset A	Offset B					Offset C	Offset D

===== Message version B =====
Block 3 is used for repeating program identification code.

	Block 1	Block 2					Block 3	Block 4
Block Meaning	Program Identification Code	Group Type	B0	TP	PTY	APP	Program Identification Code	Group Specific Payload
Payload Bit Value	XXXX XXXX XXXX XXXX	XXXX	1	X	XXXXX	XXXXX	XXXX XXXX XXXX XXXX	XXXX XXXX XXXX XXXX
Offset Value (Sync)	Offset A	Offset B					Offset C'	Offset D

==== Program identification code (PI code) ====
This allows for quick identification of radio program type, based on country, coverage area, and program reference number. While the country code is specified by the standard, bit 11 to bit 0 is specified by each country local authorities.

PI Code	Nibble 0		Nibble 1		Nibble 2		Nibble 3	
Meaning	Country Code		Program Area Coverage		Program Reference Number			
Bit Position	b15	b12	b11	b8	b7	b4	b3	b0

Country codes are re-used, but only in geographically distant regions beyond FM broadcast range from each other. For example, country code F is assigned to France, Norway, Belarus and Egypt. Neighbouring countries never have the same country code which means it is not necessary for PI codes to be coordinated with adjacent countries.

==== Group type ====
This is a list of the 16 group types. Each group type has two possible versions available

Group Type	Bit Value	Message Version A	Message Version B
0	0000	Basic Tuning and Switching Information Only	
1	0001	Program Item Number and Slow Labeling Code	Program Item Number
2	0010	Radio Text	
3	0011	Application Identification for Open Data Applications	Open Data Applications
4	0100	Clock Time and Date	Open Data Applications
5-7	0101-0111	Open Data Applications	
8	1000	Traffic Message Channel or Open Data Applications	Open Data Applications
9	1001	Open Data Applications	
10	1010	Program Type Name (RBDS)	Open Data Applications
11-13	1011-1101	Open Data Applications	
14	1110	Enhanced Other Networks	
15	1111	Long PS name	Fast switching information

==== Traffic Program ====
This can be considered an additional program type bit, and indicates that the station broadcasts periodic traffic reports. By including it in every group, a receiver can quickly search for a station which includes traffic reports.

Another bit, traffic announcement (TA), is sent in block types 0A, 0B and 15B to indicate that such a report is in progress. It is common for otherwise-simulcast transmitters to have periodic local traffic reports which are customized to the individual transmitter. The traffic announcement bit tells a receiver that a transmitter-specific broadcast is in progress, and it should avoid switching frequencies while they are in progress.

There is a different form of traffic announcement bit in block type 14B (Enhanced Other Networks), which indicates the presence of a traffic announcement on a different radio station, so that radio receivers can automatically switch.

=== RDS message examples ===
These are non-comprehensive examples that cover just the simple messages like station name, radio text, and date/time.

==== Group type 0 – Version B – Station name ====
Version	Block 1 : 26bits		Block 2 : 26bits										Block 3 : 26bits		Block 4 : 26bits		
Block Internal	PI Code	Check + Offset A	GTYPE	B0	TP	PTY	TA	M/S	DI	C1	C0	Check + Offset B	PI Code	Check + Offset C'	Character A	Character B	Check + Offset D
Bit Value	16 bits		0000	1	X	XXXXX	X	X	X	X	X		16 bits		8 bits char	8 bits char	

As we have already described previous fields above, these dot points below show just the application specific fields.

- TA : Traffic Announcement
- M/S : Music/Speech

The station name and decoder identification code is sent progressively over 4 groups, where the offset is defined by bit C1 and C0.

Character Segment			Station Name :								Decoder Identification Code : 4 bit			
C1	C0	Offset	0	1	2	3	4	5	6	7	3	2	1	0
0	0	0	A	B							DI			
0	1	1			A	B						DI		
1	0	2					A	B					DI	
1	1	3							A	B				DI

==== Group type 2 – Radio text ====
RadioText Version A	Block 1 : 26bits		Block 2 : 26bits										Block 3 : 26bits			Block 4 : 26bits		
Block Internal	PI Code	Check + Offset A	GTYPE	B0	TP	PTY	A/B	C3	C2	C1	C0	Check + Offset B	Character A	Character B	Check + Offset C	Character C	Character D	Check + Offset D
Bit Value	16 bits		0010	0	X	XXXXX	X	X	X	X	X		8 bits char	8 bits char		8 bits char	8 bits char	

RadioText Version B	Block 1 : 26bits		Block 2 : 26bits										Block 3 : 26bits		Block 4 : 26bits		
Block Internal	PI Code	Check + Offset A	GTYPE	B0	TP	PTY	A/B	C3	C2	C1	C0	Check + Offset B	PI Code	Check + Offset C'	Character C	Character D	Check + Offset D
Bit Value	16 bits		0010	1	X	XXXXX	X	X	X	X	X		16 bits		8 bits char	8 bits char	

As we have already described previous fields above, these dot points below show just the application specific fields.

- A/B : Text A/B flag is used to detect if a screen clear is requested.
- C3 to C0 : Is the text segment offset value

The station name and decoder identification code is sent progressively over 4 groups, where the offset is defined by bit C1 and C0.

Text Segment					Version A				Version B			
C3	C2	C1	C0	Offset	Char A	Char B	Char C	Char D	Char A	Char B	Char C	Char D
0	0	0	0	0	1	2	3	4	Version B Specifies That This Field Is For Program Identification Code		1	2
0	0	0	1	1	5	6	7	8	Version B Specifies That This Field Is For Program Identification Code		3	4
0	0	1	0	2	9	10	11	12	Version B Specifies That This Field Is For Program Identification Code		5	6
...	...	...	...	etc...	...	...	...	...	Version B Specifies That This Field Is For Program Identification Code		...	...
1	1	1	1	15	61	62	63	64	Version B Specifies That This Field Is For Program Identification Code		31	32

==== Group type 4 – Version A – Clock time and date ====
Version	Block 1: 26 bits		Block 2: 26 bits									Block 3: 26 bits		Block 4: 26 bits	
Block Internal	PI Code	Check + Offset A	GTYPE	B0	TP	PTY	R	R	R	Time/Date Data	Check + Offset B	Time/Date Data	Check + Offset C'	Time/Date Data	Check + Offset D
Bit Value	16 bits		0100	0	X	XXXXX				2 bits		16 bits		16 bits	

When group type 4A is used, it shall be transmitted every minute according to EN 50067.

The clock time group is inserted so that the minute edge will occur within ±0.1 seconds of the end of the clock time group.

Time and date are packed as these:

Time/Date Data	Half Block 2 Payload								Block 3 Payload																Block 4 Payload															
Payload Bit Pos	7	6	5	4	3	2	1	0	15	14	13	12	11	10	9	8	7	6	5	4	3	2	1	0	15	14	13	12	11	10	9	8	7	6	5	4	3	2	1	0
Field Bit Pos	etc...			Reserved			16	15	14	13	12	11	10	9	8	7	6	5	4	3	2	1	0	4	3	2	1	0	5	4	3	2	1	0	±	4	3	2	1	0
Description	etc...			Reserved			Modified Julian Day Number																	UTC Hours (0–23)					UTC Minutes (0–59)						Local Time Offset					

Note: The local time offset is expressed in multiples of half hours within the range −15.5h to +15.5h. It is expressed in signed magnitude form, with the most significant bit being the "Local Offset Sign" bit (LOS), 0 = + (east of Greenwich), 1 = −.

== Example of RDS usage ==
The following images illustrate how RDS can be used on an FM radio station. The first three images show the display on the Sony XDR-S1 DAB/FM/MW/LW portable radio. The second and third were taken when the radio was tuned to Nottingham radio station Trent FM.

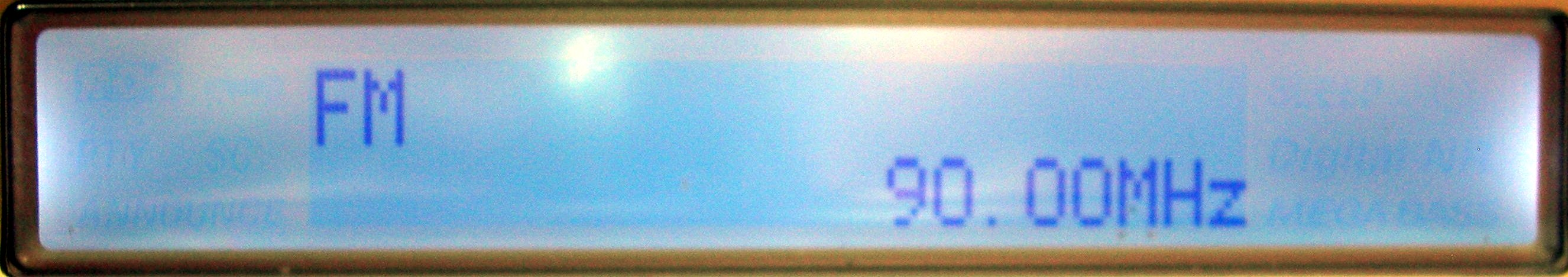
Typical radio display when no RDS data is available

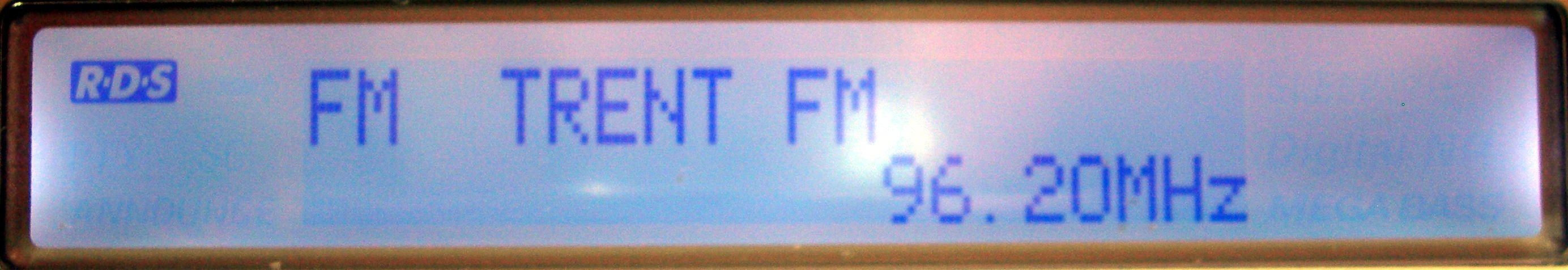
Typical radio display showing the PS name (programme service) field.

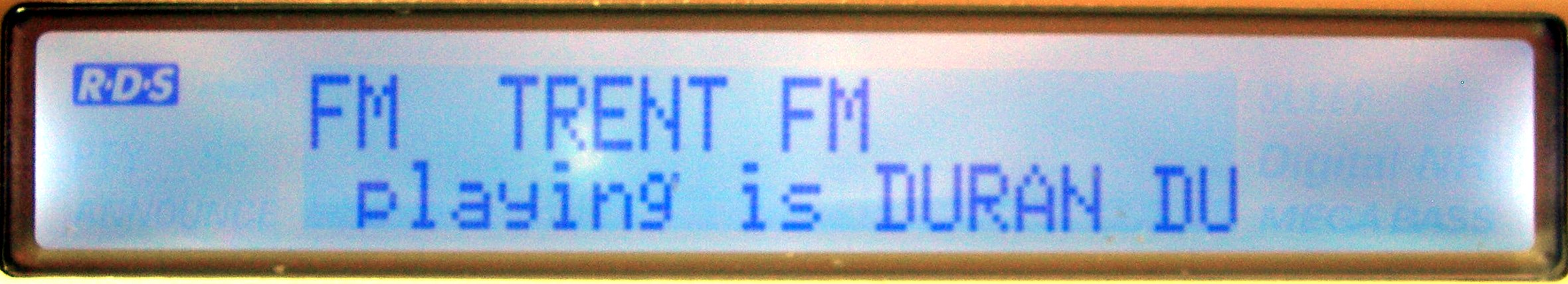
Sample Radio Text usage, in this case showing the name and artist of the song being broadcast – Duran Duran's "Save a Prayer" – the bottom line scrolls to reveal the rest of the text.

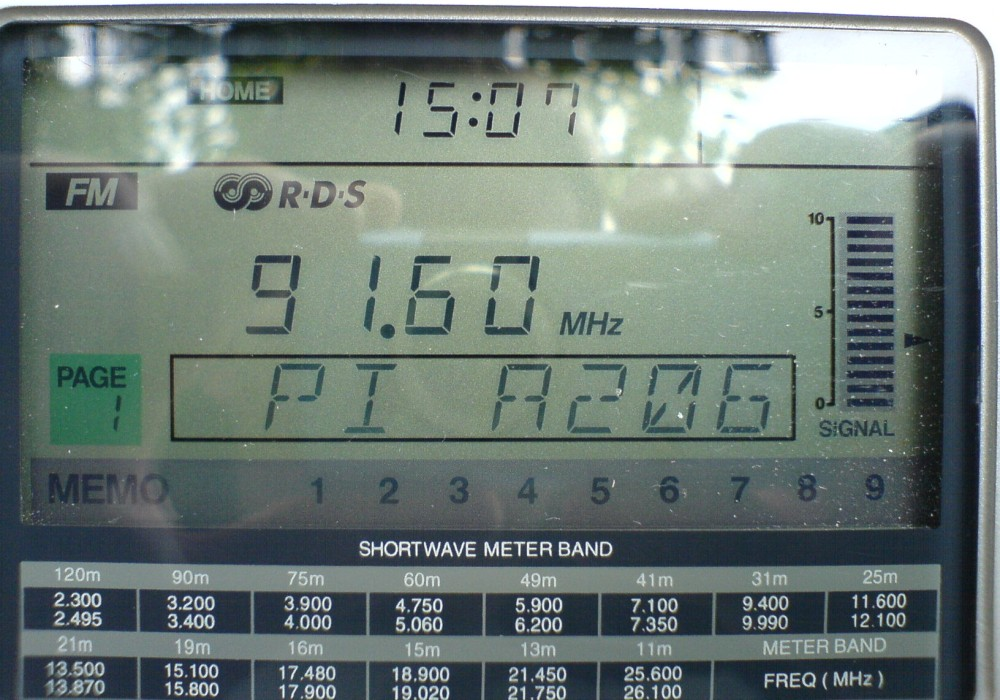
PI A206

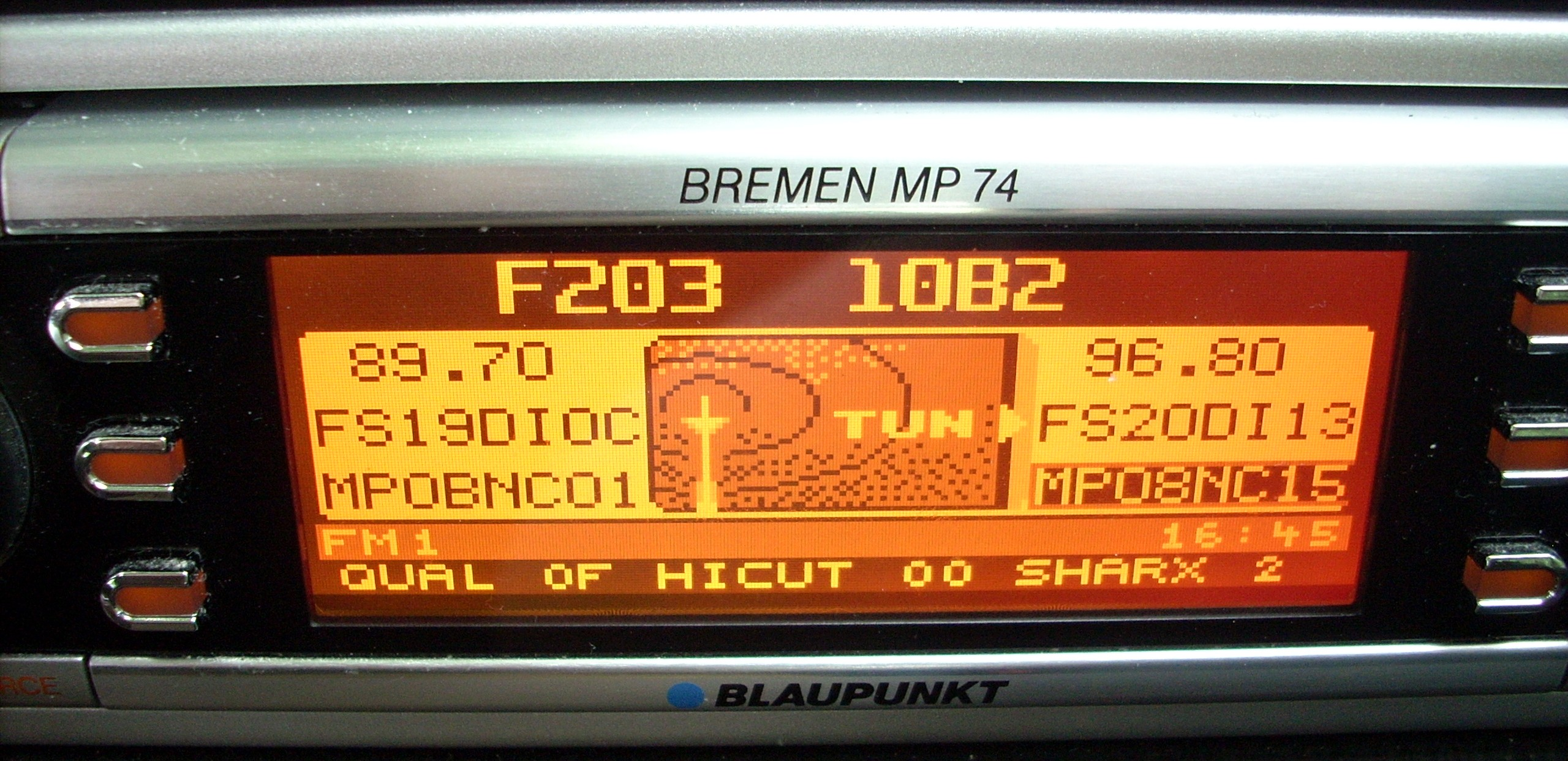
Service menu of a car radio

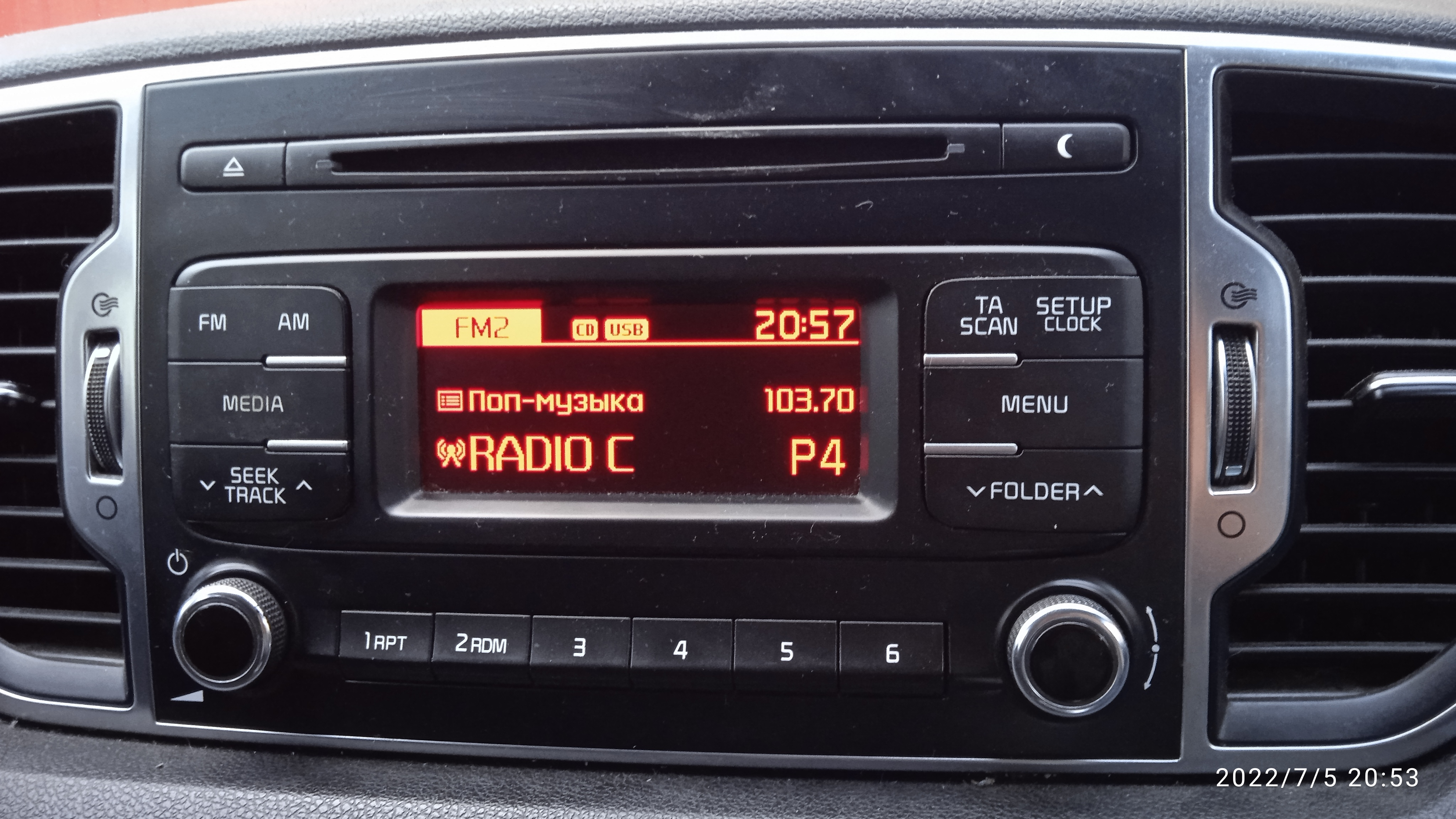
RDS on Radio C (Радио СИ) Yekaterinburg 103.7 MHz

== Alternative frequency ==
Alternative frequency (or AF) is an option that allows a receiver to re-tune to a different frequency that provides the same station, when the first radio signal becomes too weak (e.g. when moving out of range). This is most often used in car stereo systems. The receiver must check that the PI code of the alternative frequency matches the PI of the currently tuned station so that it knows it is retuning to the same station. Modern receivers may have two tuners which can make the retuning process transparent (inaudible) to the user. The second tuner can also scan all channels to find a matching PI code which reduces the importance of the AF list.

== RDS decoder chipsets ==
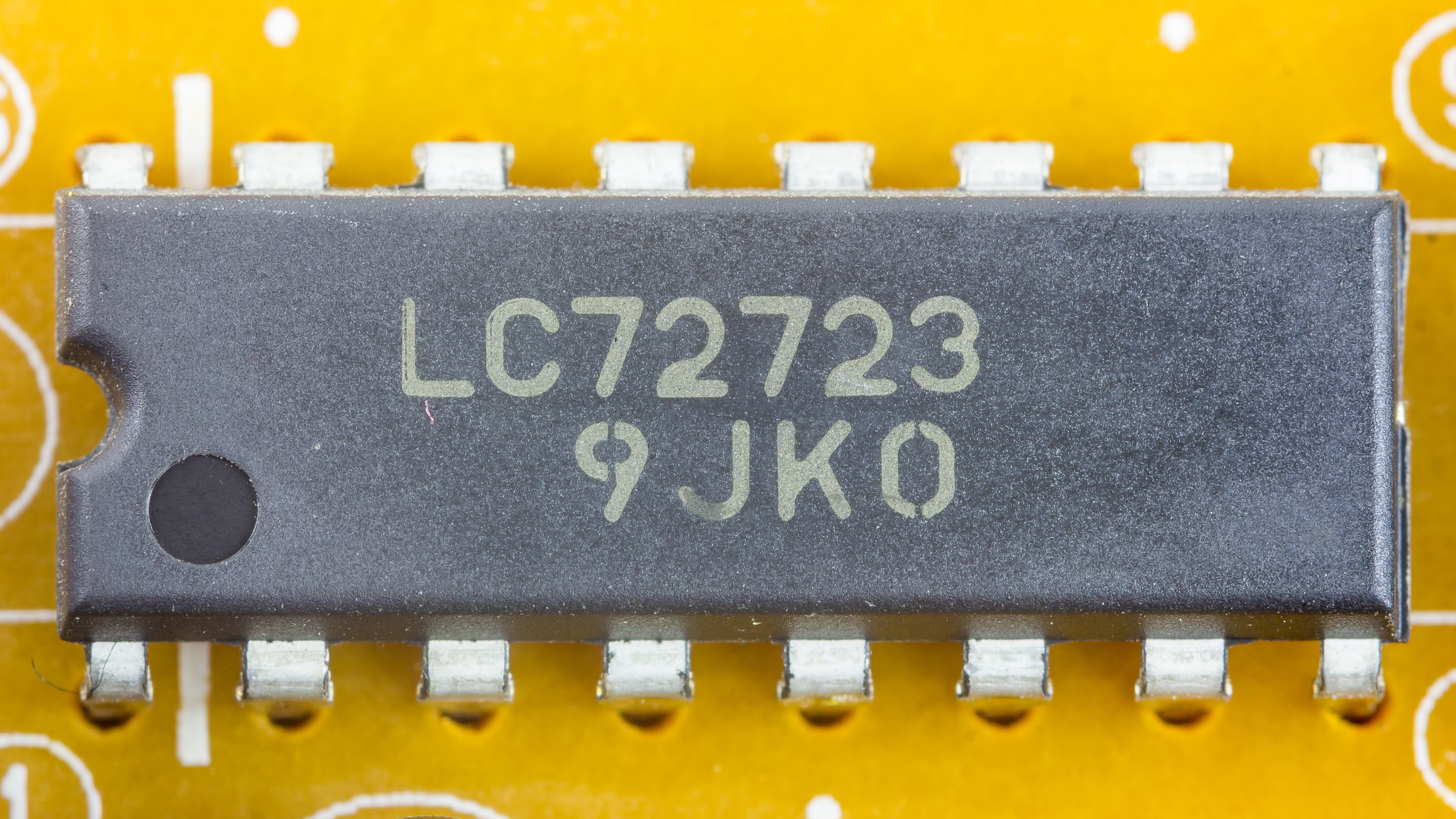
RDS Demodulator Sanyo LC72723

Companies such as ST Microelectronics, Skyworks Solutions in Austin, Texas and NXP Semiconductors (formerly Philips) offered single-chip solutions for decoding RDS. Modern radios do this using software in DSP circuits.

== See also ==
Typical spectrum of composite baseband signal

High-level RDS APIs

- Advanced Multimedia Supplements (JSR-234) (in Java programming language)
- OpenMAX AL (in C programming language)

Related technologies

- ALERT FM – RBDS emergency notification system
- HEARO – a defunct RBDS emergency notification system
- Extended Data Services
- Data Radio Channel (DARC)
- DirectBand
- Program and System Information Protocol
- UECP – protocol (Universal Encoder Communication Protocol)
- RDS OF THINGS – Using RDS in Smart City applications.

Related topics

- Digital radio
- Error correction
- FM broadcasting
- Internet radio device
- Modem
- Radio receiver
- Teletext – ≈6.5 kbit/s data transmission over Analog TV channel
