= Holmer Sandberge =

Inland dune area in Schleswig-Holstein, Germany

Coordinates: 53.616°N 9.700°W

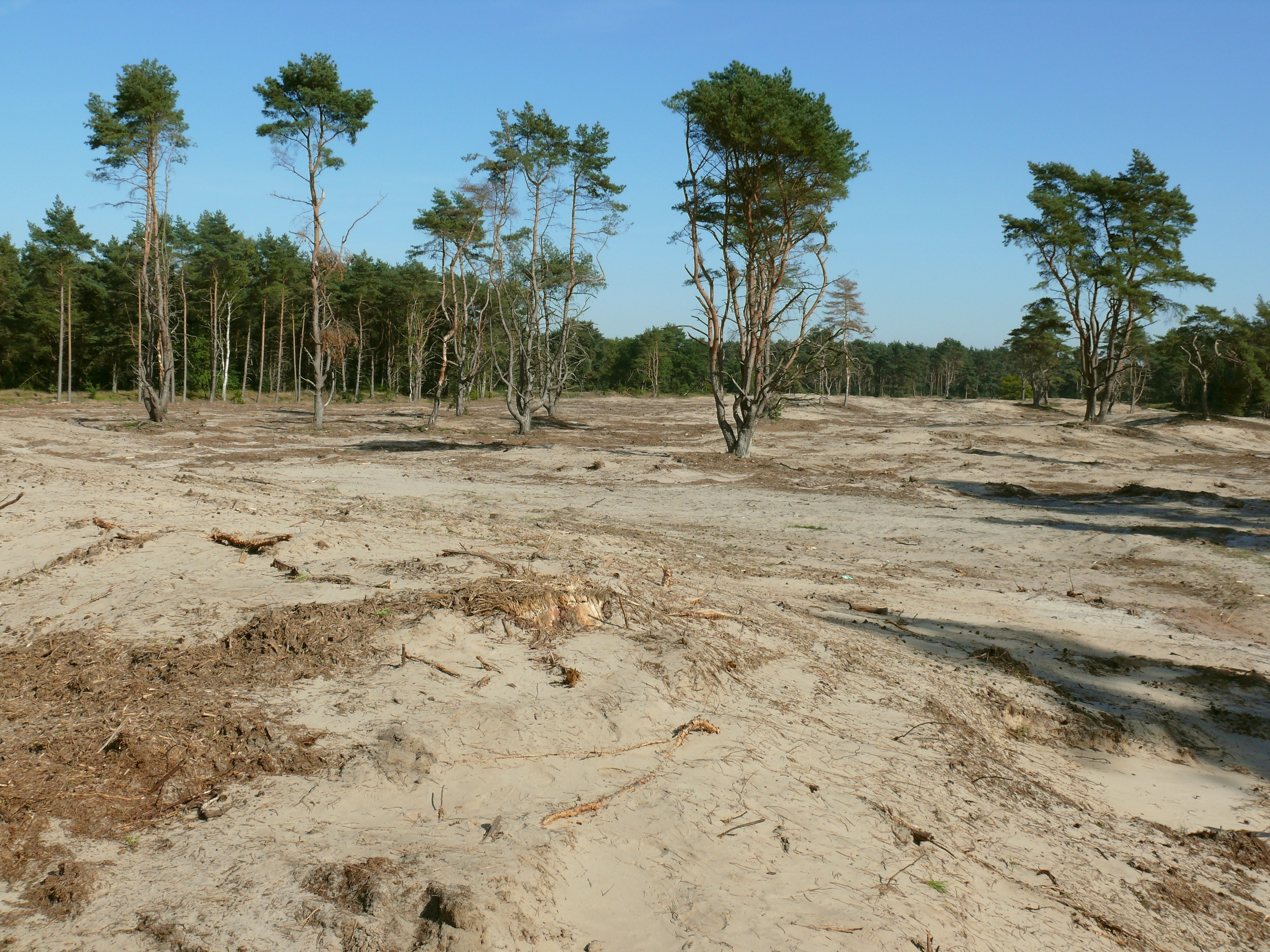
Holmer Sandberge

The Holmer Sandberge is an inland dune area in the municipality of Holm in the district of Pinneberg in the German state of Schleswig-Holstein. They form the largest inland dune area of Schleswig-Holstein. The area is part of two larger protected areas: the "Holmer Sandberge und Moorbereiche" protected landscape area, and the "Holmer Sandberge und Buttermoor" Special Area of Conservation.

The Holmer Sandberge consists of former dunes, formed during the last ice age from the former glacial valley of the River Elbe. Large open sand dunes with "tree islands" of bizarre pine regrowth makes this a unique landscape. Heaths and dry grasslands are spreading, and rare animal and plant species are finding habitats. The Holmer Sandberge are largely used as a recreational area for the surrounding area.
