= Traffic reporting =

Communication of road conditions

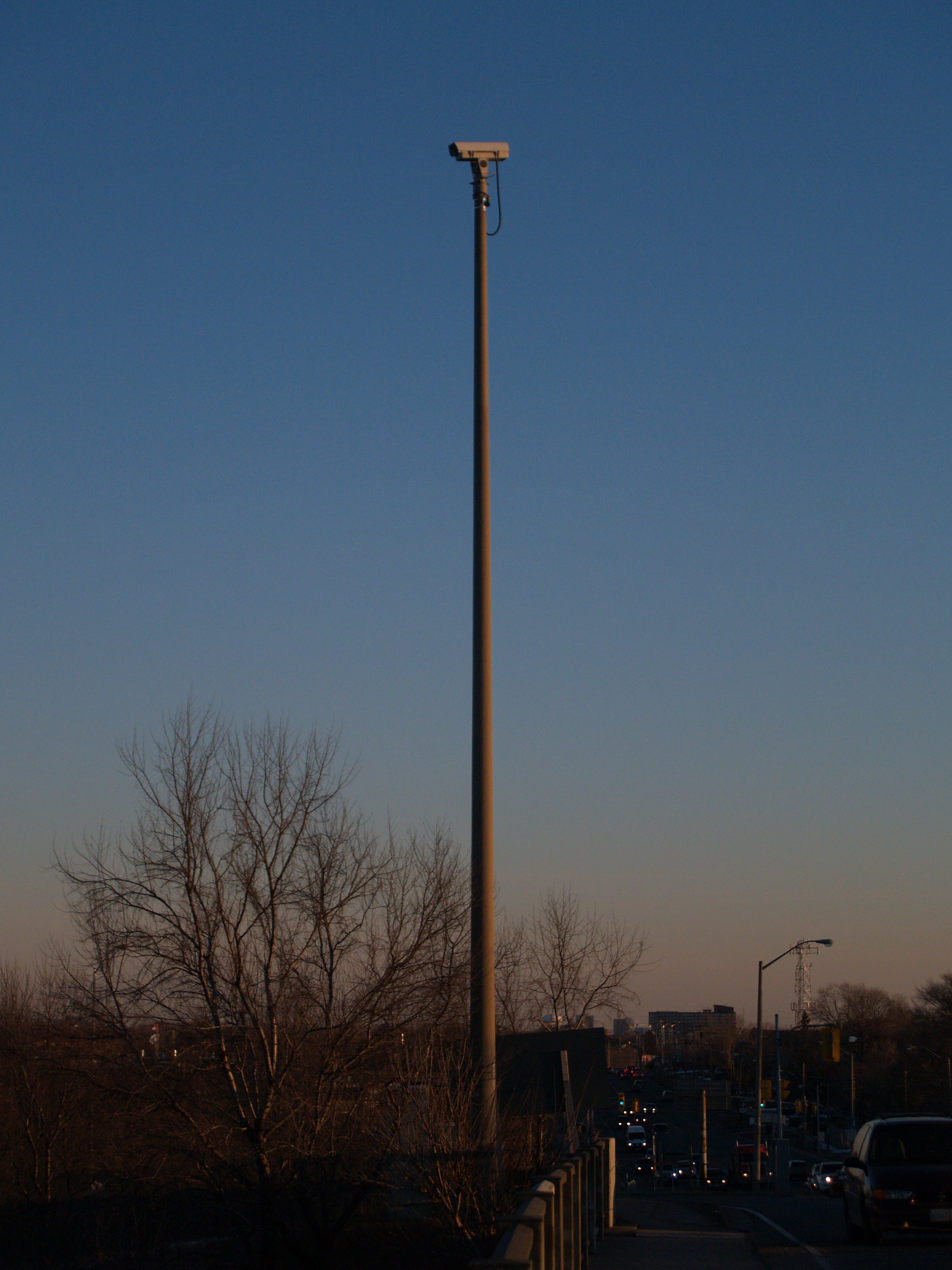
Traffic cam

Traffic reporting is the near real-time distribution of information about road conditions such as traffic congestion, detours, and traffic collisions. The reports help drivers anticipate and avoid traffic problems. Traffic reports, especially in cities, may also report on major delays to mass transit that does not necessarily involve roads. In addition to periodic broadcast reports, traffic information can be transmitted to GPS units, smartphones, and personal computers.

== Methods of gathering information ==
There are several methods in use today to gather traffic speed and incident info, ranging from professional reporters, to GPS crowdsourcing to combinations of both methods.

- INRIX uses its network of over 175 million vehicles and devices to gather speed data from mobile phones, trucks, delivery vans, and other fleet vehicles equipped with GPS locator devices including smart phones and Ford SYNC and Toyota Entune and much of Europe, South America, and Africa.
- Google Traffic works by crowdsourcing the GPS information from phone users. By calculating the speed of users along a stretch of road, Google is able to generate a live traffic map. Its subsidiary, Waze, also allows users to report directly via a smartphone app.
- TomTom Traffic uses crowd-sourced data from mobile phone users, along with data from traditional sources such as induction loops and traffic cameras.
- Monitoring police radio frequencies. Some radio stations have agreements with states' highway patrol that permit a direct connection with a law enforcement computer. This enables real-time information gathering of the latest accident reports to highway patrol divisions.
- Many areas have helicopters to overfly accident scenes and other areas of high traffic volume. For example, by the company Global Traffic Network.
- Traffic camera
- Giditraffic is an online social service which employs crowd sourcing as its primary means of providing real-time traffic updates to subscribers. The service is delivered free of charge.
- RoadPal uses crowd-sourced data from mobile users as well as the social media to provide users with traffic information of places of interest to them.
- Roadside speed sensors, either infrared sensors for spot measurements or automatic number plate recognition for measuring speed between two sites (Trafficmaster have a network of sensors on motorways and trunk roads in the UK).

== Methods of transmitting information ==
- GPS units (see Integration of traffic data with navigation systems)
- Smartphones
- Radio via voice RDS, and TA
- Electronic road signs
- 5-1-1 traffic information phone line or similar.
- Television and web

== Providers ==
- Total Traffic & Weather Network is the largest provider of real time broadcast traffic information in the United States. TTWN's broadcast traffic information appears on hundreds of radio and television stations as well on a multitude of automotive and gps navigation systems throughout the United States. TTWN traffic reports reach approximately 125M commuters per month. In 2011, TTWN acquired then competitor Metro Networks for $125M, about one-tenth of the company's $1B sale price to Westwood One a decade earlier. In 2006, TTWN partnered with BMW to become the first company in the United States to bring a product to the consumer market that displayed real time traffic information on an in-vehicle navigation system. TTWN's parent company is iHeart Media Networks.
- NAVTEQ provides data used in a wide range of applications, including automotive navigation systems for many car makers. Most clients use Navteq to provide traffic reports in major metropolitan areas throughout North America. NAVTEQ partners with third-party agencies and companies to provide its services for portable GPS devices made by Garmin, Lowrance, NDrive and web-based applications such as Yahoo! Maps, Bing Maps, and Nokia Maps. XM Satellite Radio and Sirius Satellite Radio use NAVTEQ data to show traffic information on navigation systems.

NAVTEQ's media services was spun out to form Radiate Media in 2011, which subsequently merged with Global Traffic Network in 2016, forming US Traffic Network (USTN).

- Tele Atlas, a subsidiary of TomTom. delivers digital maps and other dynamic content for navigation and location-based services, including personal and in-car navigation systems, and provides data used in a wide range of mobile and Internet map applications.
- Google Maps uses a variety of governmental and private traffic reporting organizations to provide information, along with its Waze subsidiary, which uses crowdsourcing to provide observed traffic conditions.
