= National Radio Systems Committee =

The National Radio Systems Committee (NRSC) is an organization sponsored by the Consumer Technology Association (CTA) and the National Association of Broadcasters (NAB). Its main purpose is to set industry technical standards for radio broadcasting in the United States. While regulatory authority rests with the FCC, it usually adopts NRSC recommendations, such as RBDS and spectral masks. For U.S. television, the ATSC sets standards.

== Standards ==
- NRSC-1: AM Preemphasis/Deemphasis and Broadcast Audio Transmission Bandwidth; see AMAX
- NRSC-2: Emission Limitation for Analog AM Broadcast Transmission; see Spectral mask
- NRSC-4: United States Radio Broadcast Data System (RBDS)
- NRSC-5: In-band/on-channel Digital Radio Broadcasting Standard; see HD Radio
