= Traffic announcement (radio data systems) =

Feature of Radio Data System

Traffic announcement (TA) refers to the broadcasting of a specific type of traffic report on the Radio Data System. It is generally used by motorists, to assist with route planning, and for the avoidance of traffic congestion.

The RDS-enabled receiver can be set to pay special attention to this TA flag and e.g. stop the tape/pause the CD or retune to receive a Traffic bulletin. The related TP (Traffic Programme) flag is used to allow the user to find only those stations that regularly broadcast traffic bulletins, whereas the TA flag is used to stop the tape or raise the volume during a traffic bulletin.

On some modern units, traffic reports can also be recorded and stored within the unit, both while the unit is switched on, but also for a pre-set period after the unit is turned off. It may also have in-built timers to seek and record the same for two separate daily occasions, e.g., one setting for before the morning commute, and the second for the evening return journey. These messages may then subsequently be recalled on demand by the driver. This specific function is known as TIM, or traffic information message.

== See also ==
- Traffic Message Channel – an automated service operational in Europe
