= Cinco de Mayo (disambiguation) =

Cinco de Mayo is an annual celebration held on May 5, commemorating the Battle of Puebla in Mexico.

Cinco de Mayo may also refer to:

== Songs ==
- "Cinco de Mayo", a song by Herb Alpert and the Tijuana Brass from Going Places, 1965
- "Cinco de Mayo", a song by Liz Phair from Whip-Smart, 1994
- "Cinco de Mayo", a song by Los Villains, 2003
- "Cinco de Mayo", a song by Marnie Stern from Marnie Stern, 2010
- "Cinco de Mayo", a song by Reverend Horton Heat from Space Heater, 2008
- "Cinco de Mayo", a song by Snow from Two Hands Clapping, 2002
- "Cinco de Mayo", a song by War from Outlaw, 1982
- "Cinco de Mayo", a spoken narration by Brian Wilson from That Lucky Old Sun, 2008

== Other uses ==
- "Cinco de Mayo" (Brooklyn Nine-Nine), a 2019 TV episode
- 5 de Mayo metro station, in Panama City
- 5 de Mayo (Mexico City Metrobús), a BRT station
- Rosa 'Cinco de Mayo', a floribunda rose cultivar
- Cinco de Mayo: La Batalla, a 2013 film starring Kuno Becker

== See also ==
- "Cinco de Mayo in Memphis", a song by Guy Clark from Workbench Songs, 2006, later covered by Jimmy Buffett
