= Rosa 'Hot Cocoa' =

Floribunda rose cultivar

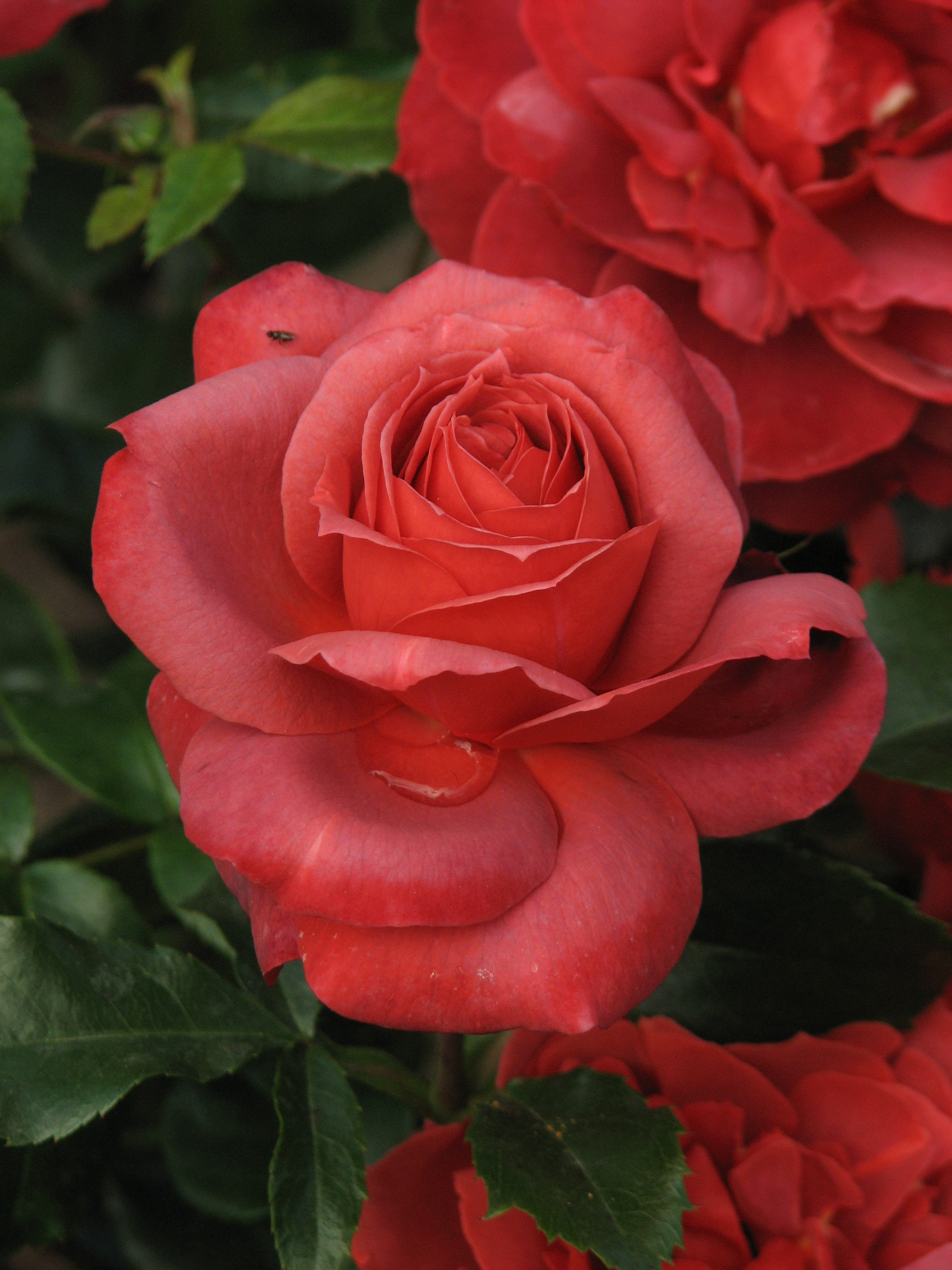
- Rosa 'Hot Cocoa'
- Genus: Rosa hybrid
- Hybrid parentage: (Playboy x Altissimo) x 'Livin' Easy
- Cultivar group: Floribunda
- Cultivar: WEKpaltlez
- Marketing names: 'Hot Cocoa', 'Kiwi', 'Nubya'
- Breeder: Carruth
- Origin: United States, 2002

Rosa 'Hot Cocoa', (a.k.a. WEKpaltlez), is a floribunda rose cultivar bred by Tom Carruth in 2002 and introduced into the United States by Weeks Roses Growers in 2003. The rose was named an All-America Rose Selections winner in 2003.

== Description ==
'Hot Cocoa' is a medium-tall bushy shrub, 3 to 5 ft (91–151 cm) in height with a 2 to 3 ft (60–90 cm) spread. Blooms are medium-large, 4—5 in (10–12 cm) in diameter, with a high-centered, cupped, and ruffled bloom form. Petal count is typically 26 to 40. Flowers are russet colored with a darker reverse, and have variation of chocolate and orange colors. The rose has a medium, fruity fragrance and large, glossy, dark green foliage. 'Hot Cocoa' is a vigorous plant and disease resistant. It blooms in flushes from spring through fall. The plants does well in USDA zone 6 and warmer.

== Child plants ==
'Hot Cocoa' was used to hybridize the following child plants:

- Rosa 'About Face', (2003)
- Rosa 'Coffee Bean', (2006)
- Rosa 'Coretta Scott King', (2012)

== Awards ==
- All-America Rose Selections (AARS) winner, USA, (2003)

== See also ==
- Garden roses
- Rose Hall of Fame
- List of Award of Garden Merit roses
