= Easy Does It =

Easy Does It may refer to:

== Film ==
- Easy Does It (1949 film) or The Great Lover, a comedy directed by Alexander Hall
- Easy Does It (2019 film), a crime film featuring Bryan Batt

== Music ==
=== Albums ===
- Easy Does It (Al Kooper album), 1970
- Easy Does It (Bobby Timmons album), 1961
- Easy Does It (Jake Owen album), 2009
- Easy Does It (Julie London album), 1968
- Easy Does It, a 1977 album by Hap Palmer
- Easy Does It, by Charlie Palmieri, 1959
- Easy Does It, by Isabelle Antena, 2005
- Easy Does It, by Dylan Scott, 2025

=== Songs ===
- "Easy Does It", composed by Sy Oliver and Trummy Young, 1939
- "Easy Does It", by Anne Murray from The Hottest Night of the Year, 1982
- "Easy Does It", by Bill Barron from The Next Plateau, 1989
- "Easy Does It", by David Coverdale and Jimmy Page from Coverdale–Page, 1993
- "Easy Does It", by Hot Apple Pie from Hot Apple Pie, 2006
- "Easy Does It", by Holly Humberstone from Paint My Bedroom Black, 2023
- "Easy Does It", by Jaye P. Morgan, 1958
- "Easy Does It", by Oli Silk, 2006
- "Easy Does It", by Sandy Bull from Demolition Derby, 1972
- "Easy Does It", by Supertramp from Crisis? What Crisis?, 1975

=== Episodes ===
- Easy Does It, a 1998 episode of Barney & Friends

== See also ==
- Eazy-Duz-It, a 1988 album by Eazy-E
  - "Eazy-Duz-It" (song), the title song
- Rosa 'Easy Does It', a rose cultivar
- "Easy Does It", a storyline in the science fiction comedy webtoon series Live with Yourself!
