= Rosa 'Duet' =

Rose cultivar

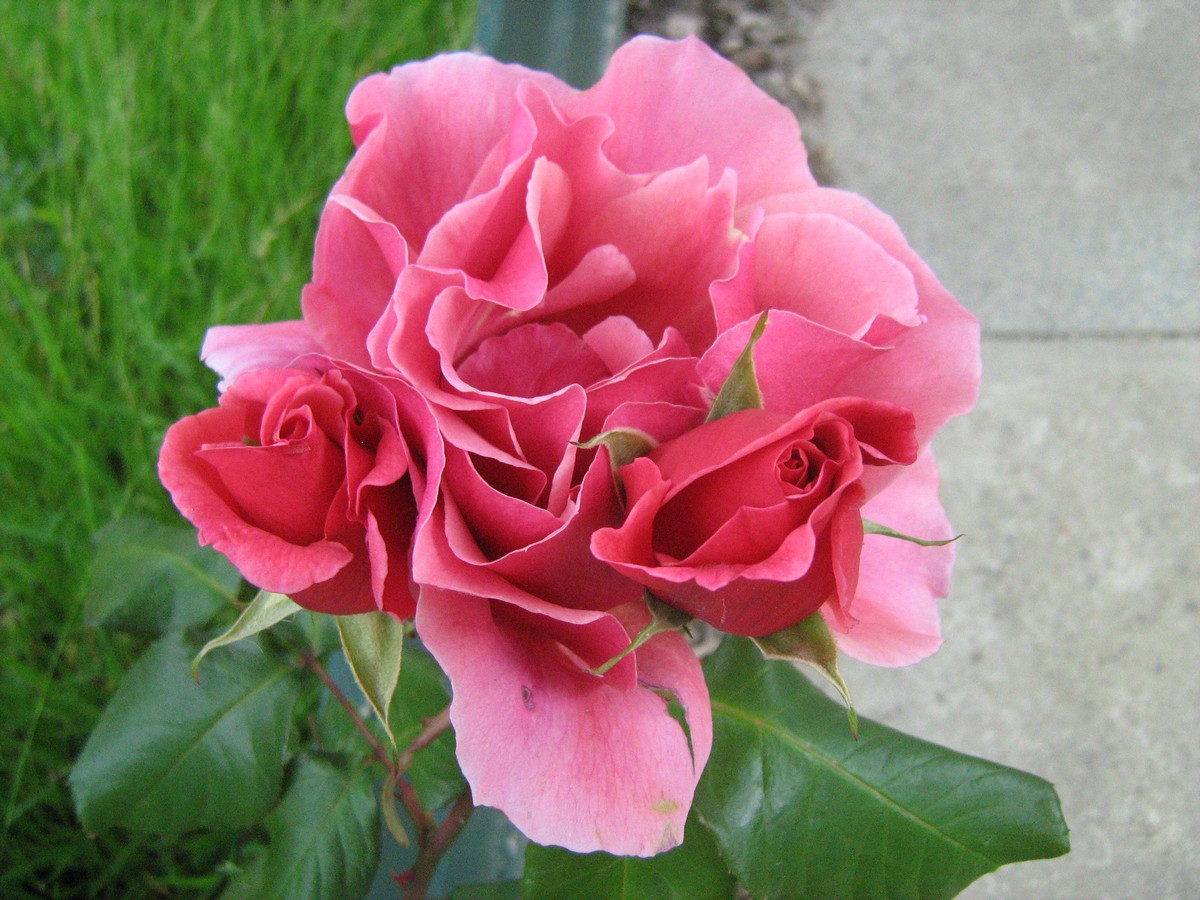
- Rosa 'Duet'
- Genus: Rosa hybrid
- Hybrid parentage: 'Fandango' x 'Roundalay'
- Cultivar group: Hybrid tea rose
- Marketing names: 'Duet'
- Breeder: Swim
- Origin: US, 1960

Rosa 'Duet' is a pink blend Hybrid tea rose cultivar, bred by hybridizer Herbert Swim in 1960 and introduced into the United States by Armstrong roses in 1960. 'Duet' was named an All-America Rose Selections winner in 1961. The stock parents are Rosa 'Fandango' and Rosa 'Roundelay'.

'Duet' is a medium-tall upright shrub, 4 to 6 ft (121-182 cm) in height with a 2 to 3 ft (60-91 cm) spread. Blooms are 4-5 in (10-12 cm) in diameter, with 26 to 40 petals. The rose has a mild fragrance. 'Duet's flowers are notable for their contrasting colors of pale pink on the upper surface with a hint of coral, and a reverse of dark purple-pink. Blooms are large, high-centered and ruffled and grow singly or in small clusters. The shrub blooms without interruption from spring through early winter. The leaves are medium-green, glossy and disease resistant. 'Duet' grows best in USDA zone 7 and warmer.

== Awards ==
- Baden Baden rose trials, Germany, 1959
- All-America Rose Selections winner, USA, (1961)

== See also ==
- Garden roses
- Rose Hall of Fame
- List of Award of Garden Merit roses
