= Rosa 'Rio Samba' =

Hybrid tea rose cultivar

Rosa 'Rio Samba
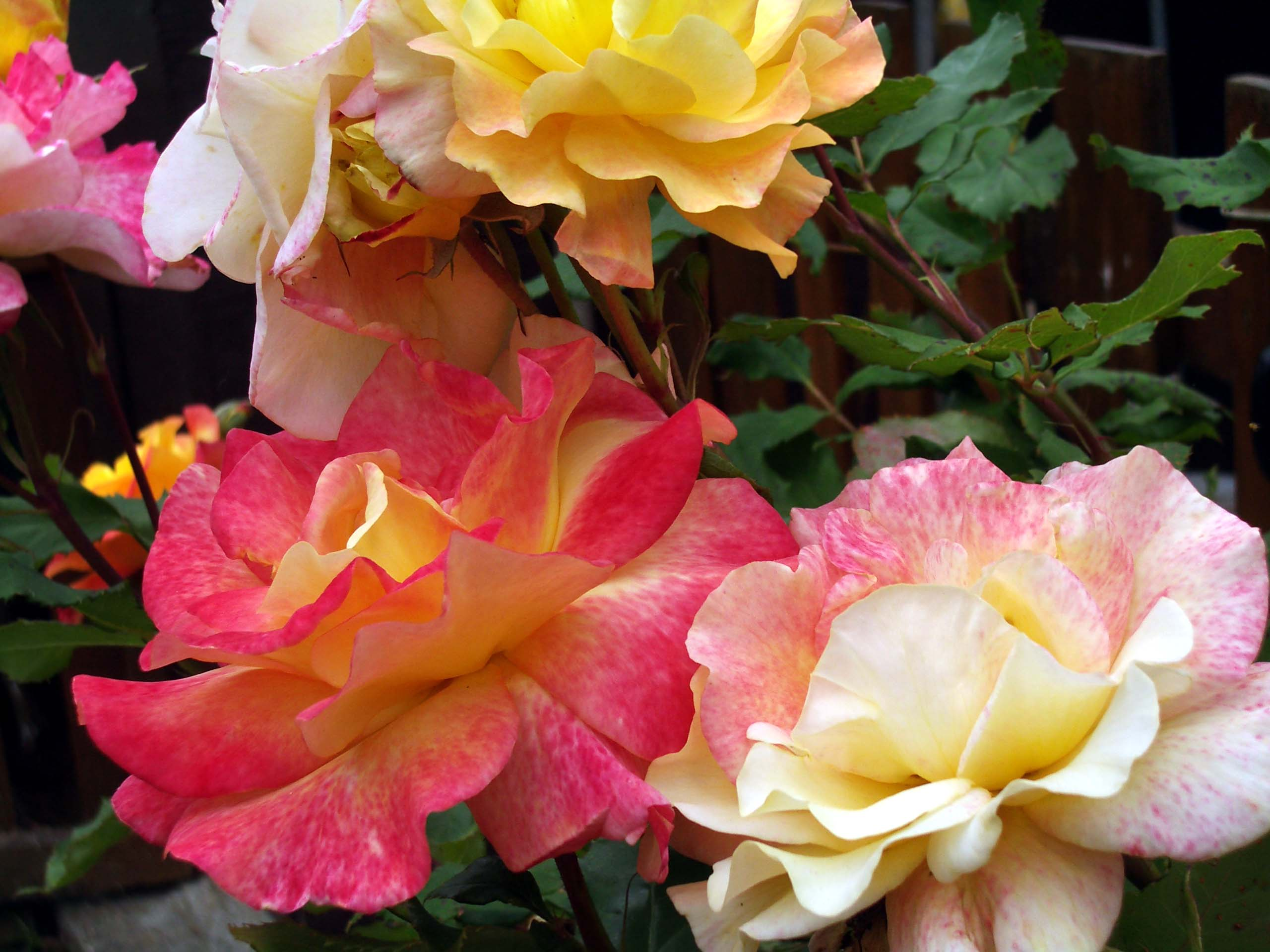
- Rosa 'Rio Samba'
- Genus: Rosa hybrid
- Hybrid parentage: 'Unnamed seedling' x 'Sunbright'
- Cultivar group: Floribunda
- Cultivar: JACrite
- Breeder: Warriner
- Origin: United States, 1991

Rosa 'Rio Samba', (a.k.a. JACrite), is a bicolor hybrid tea rose cultivar, developed in 1991 by William Warriner. The new rose variety was introduced into the United States by Jackson & Perkins in 1992. The plant is considered to be an excellent bedding rose. The rose was named an All-America Rose Selections winner in 1993.

== Description ==
'Rio Samba' is a tall, upright shrub, 5 to 6 ft (152—182 cm) in height with a 2 to 3 ft (60—90 cm) spread. Blooms are 4—5 in (10—12cm) in diameter, with a petal count of 26 to 40. Bloom form is high-centered and cupped. Buds are long and pointed, red on the outside and yellow on the inside, with a red edging. Flowers are bright red and yellow, and the red areas get larger and paler as the flower fades. The bicolor flowers display various shades of red, coral, and orange with a white center and reverse. Flowers have a mild fragrance, and are generally borne singly or in small clusters. The plant is vigorous, blooming in flushes from spring to autumn. The shrub has many prickles, and medium, matte, dark green leaves. It is disease resistant, and thrives in USDA zone 7 and warmer.

== Awards ==
- All-America Rose Selections winner, USA, (1993)

== See also ==
- Garden roses
- Rose Hall of Fame
- List of Award of Garden Merit roses
