= Rosa 'Intrigue' =

Floribunda rose cultivar

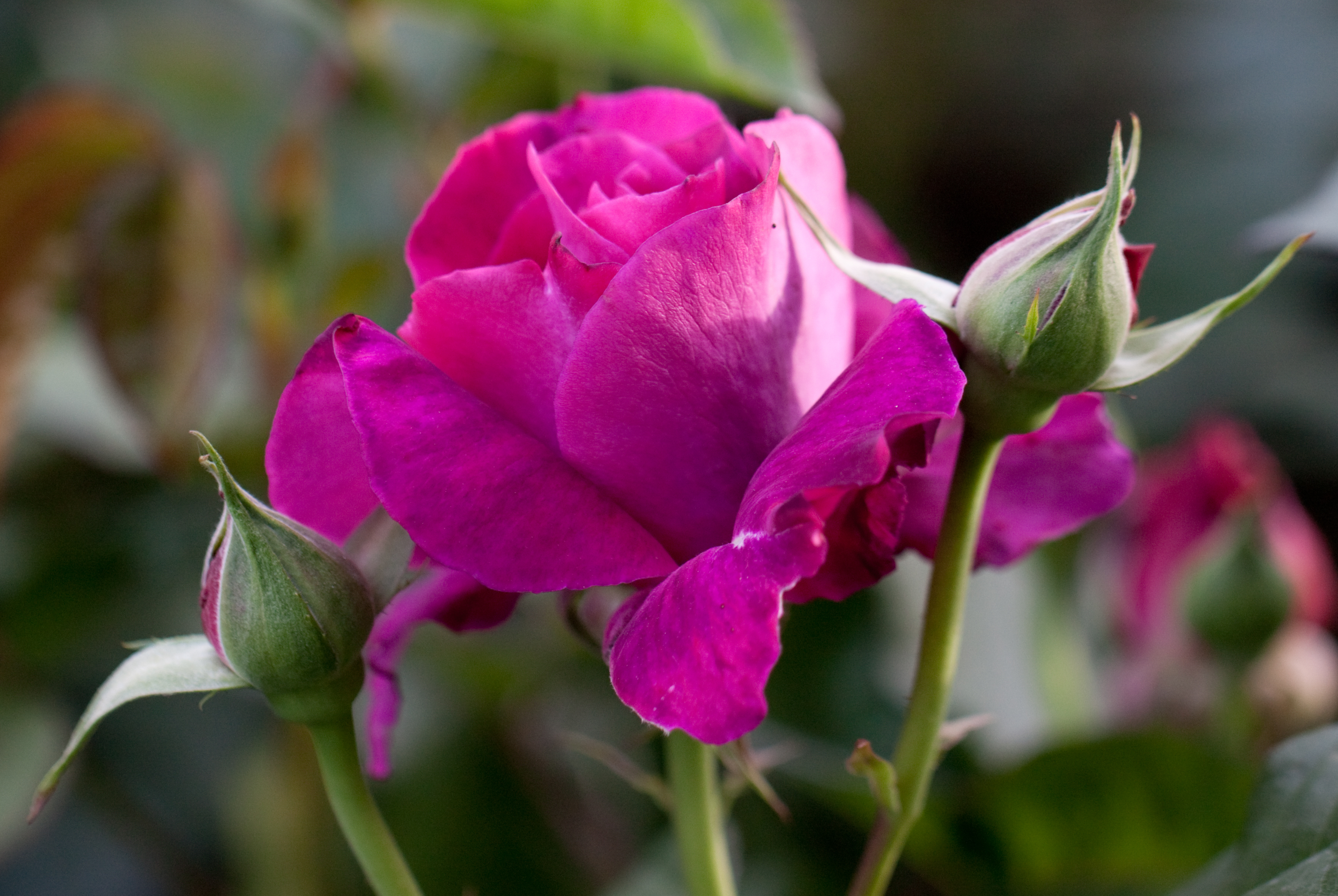
- Rosa 'Intrigue'
- Genus: Rosa hybrid
- Hybrid parentage: 'White Masterpiece' x 'Heirloom'
- Cultivar group: Floribunda
- Cultivar: JACum
- Breeder: Warriner
- Origin: United States, 1982

Rosa 'Intrigue' (a.k.a. JACum) is a mauve floribunda rose cultivar, bred by William Warriner, and introduced by Jackson & Perkins into the United States in 1982. The cultivar was named an All-America Rose Selections winner in 1984.

== Description ==
'Intrigue' is a tall, lanky upright shrub, 3 to 5 ft (90–150 cm) in height, with a 2 to 3 ft (60–90 cm) spread. Blooms have an average diameter of 3.5 inches (9 cm). Flowers are purplish-red in color and fade to magenta. Flowers have a strong fragrance, and large double petals (17–25) borne in large clusters of 5 to 15 on long stems. The leaves are medium in size, glossy, and dark green. The plant thrives in USDA zone 6b and warmer.

== Awards ==
- All-America Rose Selections winner, USA, (1984)

== See also ==
- Garden roses
- Rose Hall of Fame
- List of Award of Garden Merit roses
