= Rosa 'Apricot Nectar' =

Hybrid tea rose cultivar

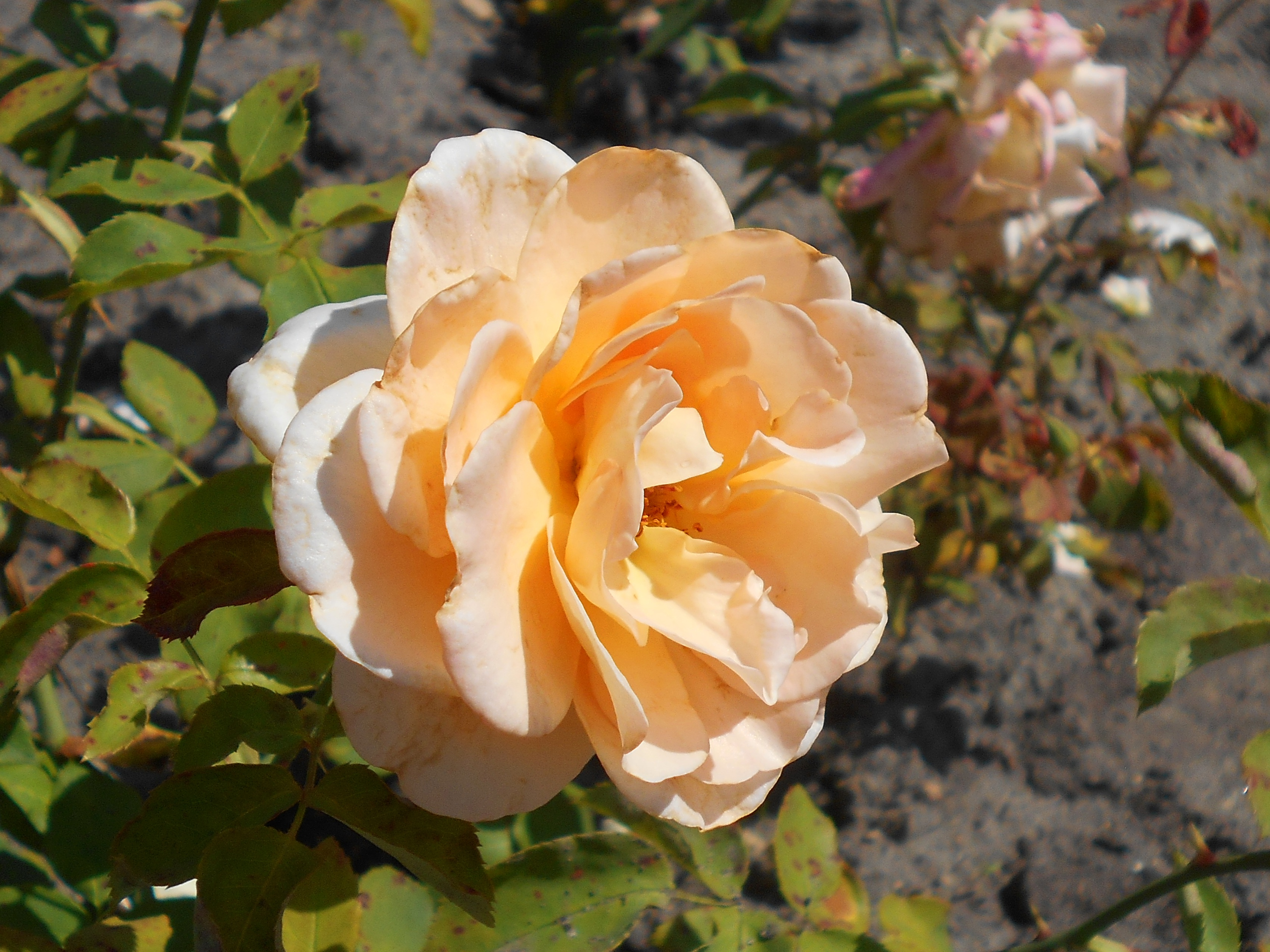
- Rosa 'Apricot Nectar'
- Genus: Rosa hybrid
- Hybrid parentage: 'Unnamed seedling' x 'Spartan'
- Cultivar group: Hybrid tea rose
- Marketing names: 'Apricot Nectar', 'Apricot Nektar'
- Breeder: Boerner
- Origin: United States, before 1964

Rosa 'Apricot Nectar' is a hybrid tea rose cultivar, bred by Eugene Boerner before 1964. The plant is considered very easy to grow and is well known for its attractive pale apricot pink color. It was named an All-America Rose Selections (AARS) winner in 1966.

== Description ==
'Apricot Nectar' is a medium, upright shrub, 3 to 4 ft (90–121 cm) in height with a 3 to 4 ft (90–121 cm) spread. Blooms are 4.5 in (11.43 cm) in diameter, with 26 to 40 petals. Flowers have a high-centered, double bloom form, and are borne in large clusters of 3–11. The flowers are a pale apricot-pink color with darker backs and yellow at the center. The entire flower fades to light yellow as it ages. The flower is exceptionally attractive in evening light, and produces the best flowers in warm, dry climates. The rose has a strong and fruity fragrance and glossy, dark green foliage. It is very disease resistant and blooms in flushes throughout its growing season. The plants does well in USDA zone 6 and warmer.

== Child plants ==
'Apricot Nectar' was used to hybridize one child plant, the hybrid tea rose Rosa 'Serendipity'. The new cultivar is yellow in color with apricot hues, fading to cream as the flowers mature. The cultivar was developed by Dr. Griffith Buck in 1978 by crossing ('Western Sun' x 'Carefree Beauty') and ('Apricot Nectar' and 'Prairie Princess').

== Awards ==
- All-America Rose Selections (AARS) winner, USA, (1966)

== See also ==
- Garden roses
- Rose Hall of Fame
- List of Award of Garden Merit roses
