= Rosa 'Europeana' =

Dark red rose cultivar

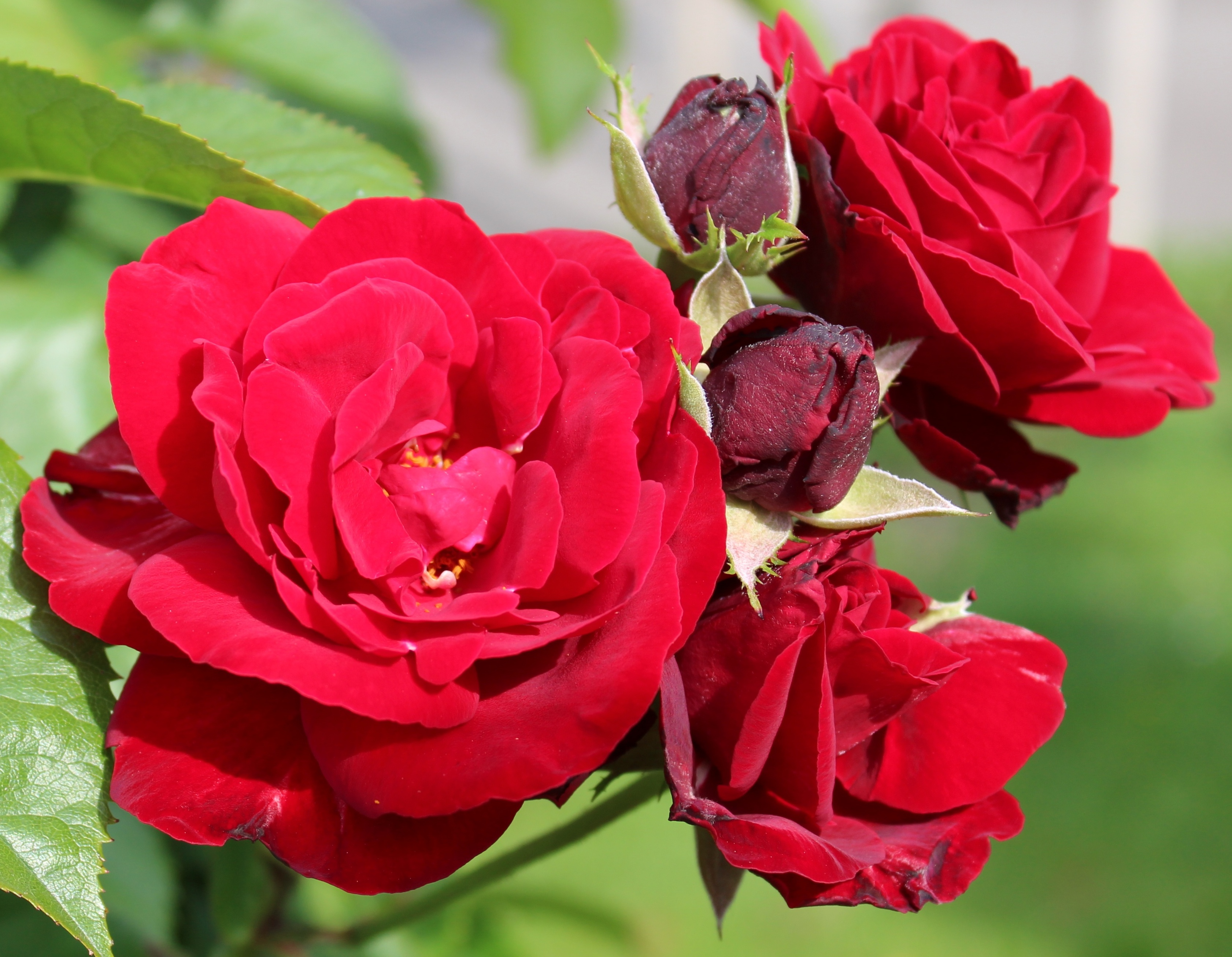
- Rosa 'Europeana'
- Genus: Rosa hybrid
- Hybrid parentage: 'Ruth Leuwerik' x 'Rosemary Rose'
- Cultivar group: Floribunda
- Marketing names: 'Europeana'
- Breeder: de Ruiter Innovations
- Origin: Belgium, 1963

Rosa 'Europeana' is a dark red Floribunda rose cultivar. It was created by de Ruiter Innovations in Belgium in 1963. It was named an All-America Rose Selections in 1968.

== History ==
'Europeana' was created by de Ruiter Innovations in 1963. The stock parents of this rose are the Floribunda cultivars, 'Ruth Leuwerik' and 'Rosemary Rose'. The plant was introduced into Australia by Roy H. Rumsey Pty. Ltd. in 1965 as 'Europeana'.

== Description ==
'Europeana' is a short, vigorous bushy shrub, 2 to 3 ft (60–91 cm) in height, with a 2 to 3 ft (60-91 cm) spread. Blooms are small, 2 to 3 in (6—9 cm) in diameter. Blooms are semi-double in form, and are borne on flat-topped clusters of 10 to 30 petals. The rose has a mild fragrance. The double to full, dark red petals are rosette-shaped and are long lasting. New leaves are dark red, later turning dark green and glossy. The shrub is heat tolerant and a repeat bloomer.

== Child plants ==
- Rosa 'All Ablaze', Tom Carruth, (2000)
- Rosa 'Hanagasumi', (1985)
- Rosa 'Morgenrot', Kordes, (1983),
- Rosa 'Royal Occasion', (1974)
- Rosa 'Tornado', Kordes,(1973)
- Rosa 'Watercolors Home Run', Tom Carruth, 2012

== Awards ==
- The Hague Gold Medal, (1962)
- All-America Rose Selections winner, USA, (1968)
- Portland Gold Medal, (1970)

== See also ==
- Garden roses
- Rose Hall of Fame
- List of Award of Garden Merit roses
