= Rosa 'Mardi Gras' =

Floribunda rose cultivar

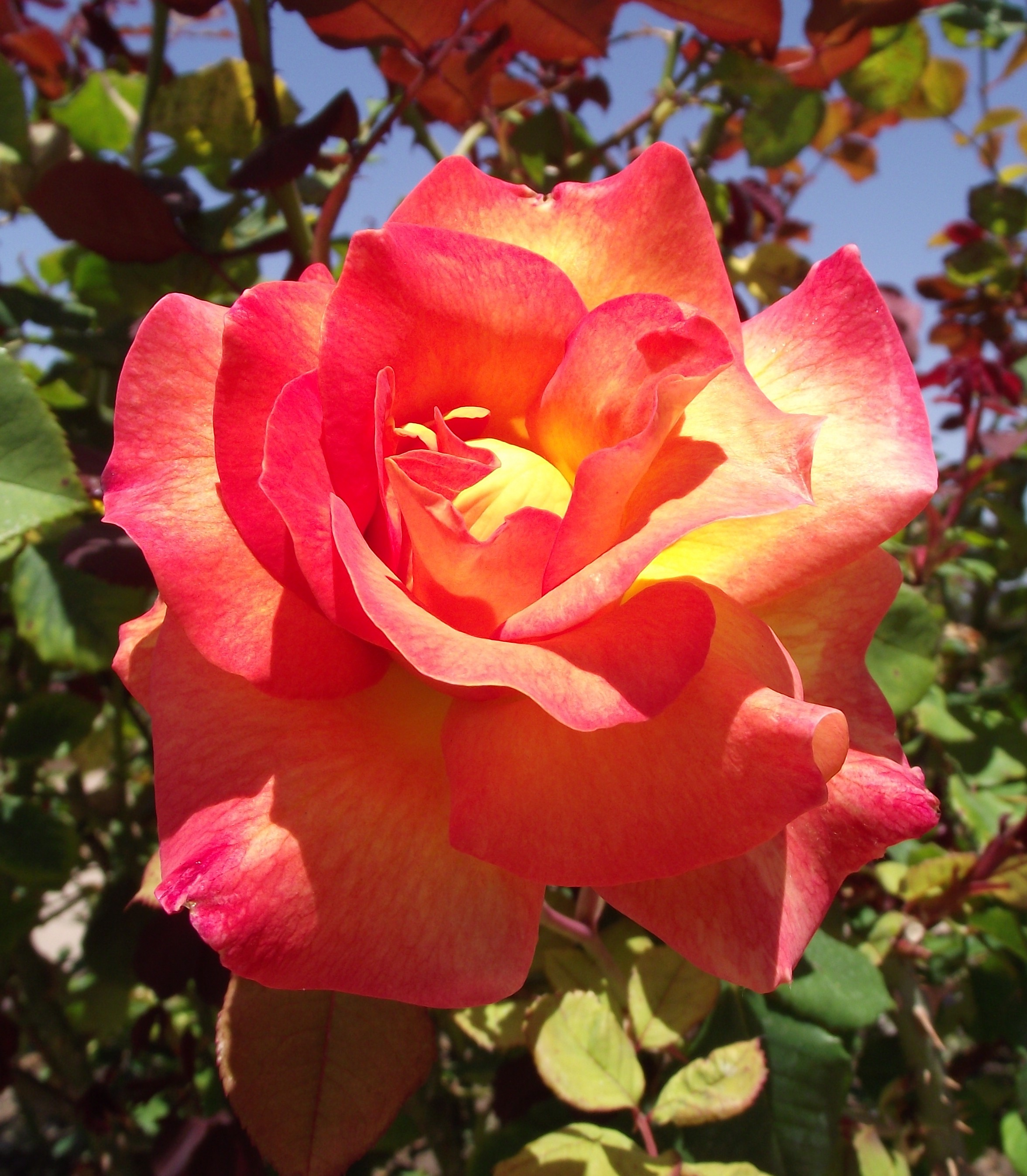
- Rosa 'Mardis Gras'
- Genus: Rosa hybrid
- Hybrid parentage: AROfres × 'Singin' in the Rain'
- Cultivar group: Floribunda
- Cultivar: JACfrain
- Breeder: Zary
- Origin: United States, 2007

Rosa 'Mardi Gras', (a.k.a. JACfrain), is a floribunda rose cultivar, bred by Dr.Keith Zary in 2007, and introduced into the United States by Jackson & Perkins in 2008. The rose was named an All-America Rose Selections winner in 2008.

== Description ==
'Mardis Gras' is a tall upright shrub, 3 to 4 ft (90–120 cm) in height with a 2 to 3 ft (60–90 cm) spread. Blooms are medium, 2—3 in (5—7.5 cm) in diameter, with a medium double (17-25) high-centered bloom form. Blooms are generally borne singly or in small clusters. The flowers are a blend of orange, yellow and pink hues. The rose has a medium musk fragrance and large, semi-glossy, dark green, leathery foliage. 'Mardis Gras' is disease resistant, and blooms continuously from spring through fall. The plants does well in USDA zone 6b and warmer.

== Awards ==
- All-America Rose Selections (AARS) winner, USA, (2008)

== See also ==
- Garden roses
- Rose Hall of Fame
- List of Award of Garden Merit roses
