= All-America Rose Selections =

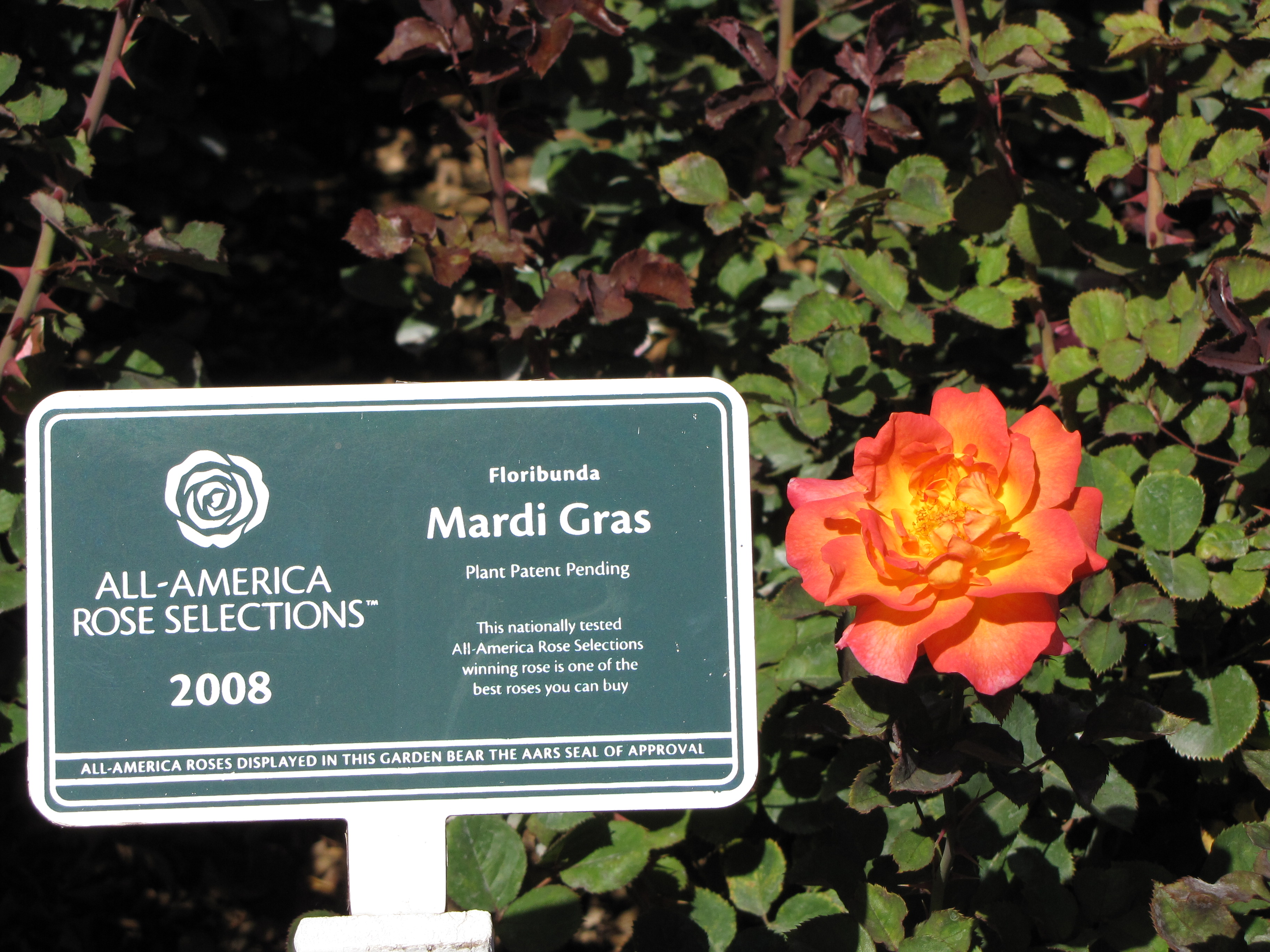
AARS sign, 2008 winner Rosa 'Mardi Gras'

The All-America Rose Selections (AARS) is an award that was given annually, from 1940 to 2013, by the American rose industry to an outstanding new rose variety. The AARS selection was regarded as the most prestigious rose prize in the United States for 73 years. AARS was discontinued after 2013, and was replaced in 2016 by the new American Garden Rose Selections (AGRS) program.

== History ==
In 1938, W. Ray Hastings, creator of "All-America Rose Selections", approached Charles Perkins, president of the Jackson & Perkins company with an idea for a rose testing program. Their conversation led to a meeting in Chicago on January 8, 1939, with representatives from the seventeen largest rose growers. The outcome of the meeting was the creation of the non-profit organization, "All-America Rose Selections, Inc. (AARS), with the goal of evaluating and promoting outstanding roses."' The first rose trials began in 1939 in AARS test gardens throughout the US. The first AARS winners were announced in 1940.

The "All-America Rose Selections" continued each year from 1940 until 2013. The award is considered to be the most prestigious rose award in the United States. Hybrid tea rose, 'Francis Meilland' was the last rose awarded by AARS. AARS was discontinued after 2013, and was replaced by the new "American Garden Rose Selections" program.

== Rose testing and selection ==
The AARS selection process began with a rose grower submitting a new rose (or roses) to AARS for testing. Roses were grown in official rose testing gardens, typically universities and rose nurseries throughout the US. Roses would be evaluated for two years on many qualities, including disease resistance, flowers, form, and ability to grow in many climates. "The AARS award winners chosen at the end of the trial period comprise only about four percent of all the roses tested". The winning roses can display the AARS brand on their rose tags and in nursery catalogues.

== AARS winners ==
This is a partial list of All-America Rose Selection winners.

Award year	Cultivar	Marketing name	Hybridizer	Intro year	Introduced by	Cultivar Group	Image
1941		'Charlotte Armstrong'	Lammerts (US)	1941	Armstrong Roses	Hybrid Tea	
1943		'Mary Margaret McBride'	Nicolas (US)	1942	Jackson & Perkins	Hybrid Tea	
1948		'Diamond Jubilee'	Boerner (US)	1947	Jackson & Perkins	Hybrid Tea	
1953		'Ma Perkins'	Boerner (US)	1952	Jackson & Perkins	Floribunda	
1955		'Queen Elizabeth' 'The Queen of England'	Lammerts (US)	1954	Germain Seed & Plant Company	Grandiflora	
1955		'Tiffany'	Lindquist (US)	1954	Howard Rose Company	Hybrid tea	
1960		''Garden Party''	Swim (US)	1959	Armstrong	Hybrid Tea	
1961		''Duet''	Swim (US)	1960	Armstrong	Hybrid Tea	
1962		''King's Ransom''	Swim (US)	1962	Armstrong	Hybrid tea	
1963		''Royal Highness''	Morey (US)	1961	Weeks Roses	Hybrid Tea	
1965		''Mister Lincoln'' 'Mr. Lincoln'	Swim & Weeks (US)	1964	Star Roses	Hybrid Tea	
1966		''Apricot Nectar''	Boerner (US)	1965	Jackson & Perkins	Hybrid Tea	
1967		'Bewitched'	Lammerts (US)	1967	Germain Seed & Plant Co.	Hybrid Tea	
1968		'Europeana'	de Ruiter Innovations (Belgium)	1963	Roy H. Rumsey Pty. Ltd.	Floribunda	
1969		''Gene Boerner'	Boerner (US)	1968	Jackson & Perkins	Floribunda	
1969		''Pascali'	Lens (Belgium)	1964	T.G. Stewart	Hybrid tea	
1971		'Red Gold' 'Rouge et Or' 'Alinka'	Patrick Dickson (Northern Ireland)	1967	Dickson Roses	Floribunda	
1973		'Electron' 'Mullard Jubilee'	McGredy IV (Northern Ireland)	1970	Sam McGredy	Hybrid Tea	
1974		'Perfume Delight'	Swimm & Weeks (US)	1973	Star Roses	Hybrid Tea	
1975	TANolg	'Oregold' 'Anneliese Rothenberger'	Tantau (Germany)	1970	Jackson & Perkins	Hybrid Tea	
1976	KORshel	'Seashell'	Kordes (Germany)	1976	Jackson & Perkins	Hybrid Tea	
1977	ANDeli	'Double Delight'	Ellis & Swim (US)	1976	Armstrong	Hybrid Tea	
1980	JACsal	'Cherish'	Warriner (US)	1980	Jackson & Perkins	Floribunda	
1980	JACtwin	'Love'	Warriner (US)	1980	Jackson & Perkins	Grandiflora	
1981	rinaKOR	'Marina'	Kordes (US)	1974	Jackson & Perkins	Floribunda	
1983	JACjem	'Sun Flare' 'Sunflare'	Warriner (US)	1981	Jackson & Perkins	Floribunda	
1984	JACum	'Olympiad'	McGredy IV (New Zealand)	1982	McGredy Roses International	Hybrid tea	
1984	JACum	'Intrigue'	Warriner (US)	1982	Jackson & Perkins	Floribunda	
1986	AROmiclea	'Voodoo'	Christensen (US)	1984	Armstrong	Hybrid tea	
1987	MEIdomonac	'Bonica 82'; Bonica	Meilland (France)	1985	Meilland International	Shrub rose	
1988	HARroony	'Amber Queen'	Harkness (UK)	1985	R Harkness & Co. Ltd.	Floribunda	
1989	JACient	'Tournament of Roses' 'Berkeley'	Warriner (US)	1988	Jackson & Perkins	Grandiflora	
1991	MEIpitac	'Carefree Wonder' 'Dynastie'	Meilland (France)	1990	Meilland International	Shrub Rose	
1992	JACpal	'Brigadoon'	Warriner (US)	1991	Jackson & Perkins	Hybrid tea	
1993	JACrite	'Rio Samba'	Warriner (US)	1991	Jackson & Perkins	Hybrid Tea	
1994	HILaroma	'Secret'	Tracy (US)	1992	Star Roses	Hybrid Tea	
1995	MACivy	Spek's Centennial 'Singin' in the Rain'	McGredy (New Zealand)	1991	Edmunds Roses	Floribunda	
1995	JACcofl	'Brass Band'	Jack E. Christensen USA	1995	Jackson & Perkins	Floribunda	
1996	HARwelcome	'Livin' Easy' 'Fellowship'	Harkness (UK)	1992	Weeks Roses	Floribunda	
1997	WECplapep	'Scentimental'	Carruth (US)	1996	Weeks Roses	Floribunda	
1998	FRYxotic	Sunset Celebration' 'Warm Wishes'	Fryer (UK)	1994	Weeks Roses	Hybrid Tea	
1999	WEKplapic	'Betty Boop'	Carruth (US)	1999	Weeks Roses	Floribunda	
1999	WEKroalt	'Fourth of July'	Carruth (US)	1999	Weeks Roses	Climbing rose	
2000	RADrazz	'Knock Out'	Radler (US)	2000	Star Roses	Shrub rose	
2001	MEIzoele	'Glowing Peace' 'Phillippe Noiret'	Meilland (France)	1999	Meilland	Hybrid tea	
2002	BALpeace	'Love & Peace'	Lim & Twomey (US)	1991	Bailey Nurseries	Hybrid tea	
2003	WEKpaltlez	'Hot Cocoa' 'Kiwi	Carruth (US)	2002	Weeks Roses	Floribunda	
2004	JACarque	'Honey Perfume'	Zary (US)	1993	Jackson & Perkins	Floribunda	
2005	WEKosupalz	About Face	Carruth (US)	1993	Weeks Roses	Grandiflora	
2006	WEKvossutono	'Julia Child' 'Absolutely Fabulous'	Carruth (US)	2004	Weeks Roses	Floribunda	
2006	WEKisoblip	'Wild Blue Yonder'; Blue Eden	Carruth (US)	2004	Weeks Roses	Grandiflora	
2007	JACtanic	'Moondance'	Zary (US)	2003	Jackson & Perkins	Floribunda	
2008	JACfrain	'Mardi Gras'	Zary (US)	2007	Jackson & Perkins	Floribunda	
2009	Wekcobeju	'Cinco de Mayo 'Celebration Time'	Carruth (US)	2006	Weeks Roses	Floribunda	
2010	HARpageant	'Easy Does It' 'Firestar'	Harkness (US)	2004	Weeks Roses; Jackson & Perkins	Floribunda	
2011	JACmcady	'Walking on Sunshine'	Zary (US)	2010	Jackson & Perkins	Floribunda	
2012	MEIkanaro	'Sunshine Daydream'	Meilland (France)	2006	Meilland International	Grandiflora	
2013	MEItroni	'Schloss Ippenburg'; Francis Meilland	Meilland (France)	2006	Meilland International	Hybrid tea	

== See also ==
- Rose trial grounds
- International Rose Test Garden
- List of Award of Garden Merit roses
- Rose Hall of Fame
