= Rosa 'Wild Blue Yonder' =

Grandiflora rose cultivar

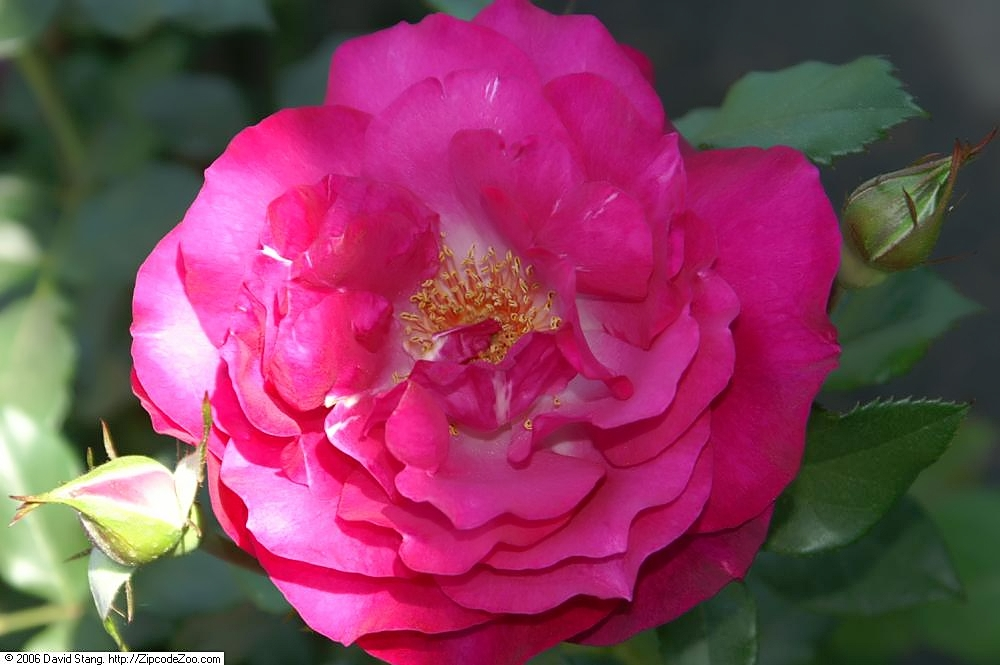
- Rosa 'Wild Blue Yonder'
- Genus: Rosa hybrid
- Cultivar group: Grandiflora
- Cultivar: WEKisosblip
- Marketing names: 'Wild Blue Yonder', 'Blue Eden'
- Breeder: Carruth
- Origin: United States, 2004

Rosa 'Wild Blue Yonder', also known as WEKisosblip, is a grandiflora rose cultivar, bred by Tom Carruth in 2004, and introduced into the United States by Weeks Rose Growers in 2006. The rose was named an All-America Rose Selections winner in 2006.

== Description ==
'Wild Blue Yonder' is a medium upright bushy shrub, 4–5 ft (120–150 cm) in height with a 3–4 ft (91–122 cm) spread. Blooms are medium-large, 4–5 in (10–13 cm) in diameter, with a full, cupped, ruffled bloom form, and a petal count of 26 to 40. Flowers bloom in clusters. The flowers are purple-red, with shades of lavender and a silver reverse. The rose has a strong, citrus fragrance and semi-glossy, dark green foliage. 'Wild Blue Yonder' is very disease resistant. It blooms in flushes from spring through fall. The plants does well in USDA zone 5 to 9.

== Child plants ==
- Rosa 'Grande Dame', (2009)
- Rosa 'Diamond Eyes', (2011)
- Rosa 'Easy to Please', (2016)

== Awards ==
- All-America Rose Selections (AARS) winner, USA, (2006)

== See also ==
- Garden roses
- Rose Hall of Fame
- List of Award of Garden Merit roses
