= Rosa 'Moondance' =

Floribunda rose cultivar

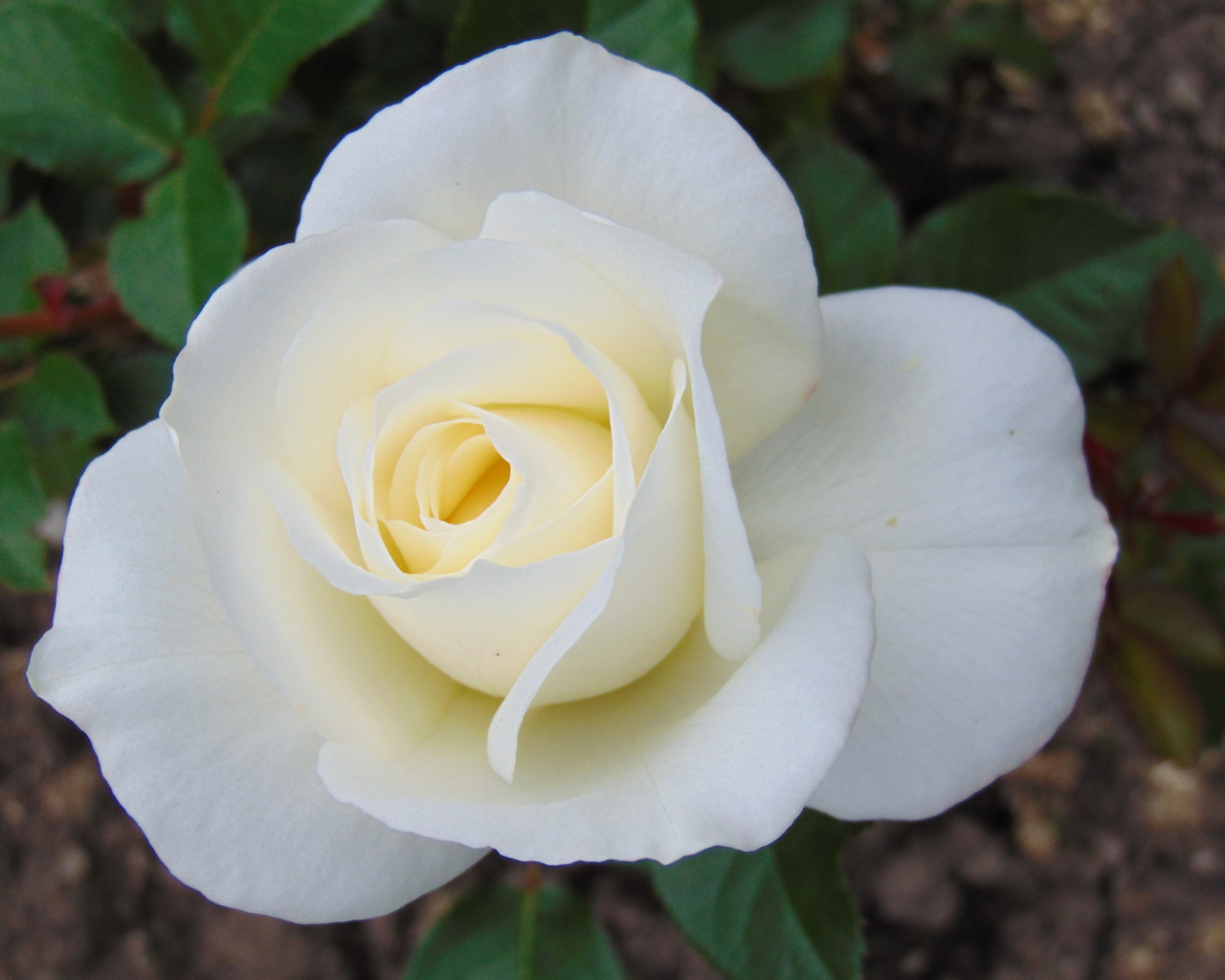
- Rosa 'Moondance'
- Genus: Rosa hybrid
- Hybrid parentage: 'Princess Alice' x 'Iceberg'
- Cultivar group: Floribunda
- Cultivar: JACtanic
- Breeder: Zary
- Origin: United States, (2003)

Rosa 'Moondance', (a.k.a. JACtanic), is a white floribunda rose cultivar, bred by Dr.Keith Zary in 2003, and introduced into the United States by Jackson & Perkins in 2007. The stock parents of 'Moondance' are 'Princess Alice' x 'Iceberg'. The rose was named an All-America Rose Selections winner in 2007.

== Description ==
'Moondance' is a medium-tall, almost thornless shrub, 4 to 5 ft (120—150 cm) in height with a 3 to 4 ft (90—120 cm) spread. Blooms are 4—5 in (10—12 cm) in diameter, with a high-centered full bloom form, and a petal count of 26 to 40. Blooms are generally borne in large clusters. The flowers are creamy white. The rose has a mild, raspberry fragrance and medium, glossy, dark green foliage. 'Moondance' is disease resistant, and blooms in flushes from spring through fall. The plants does well in USDA zone 5 and warmer.

== Awards ==
- All-America Rose Selections (AARS) winner, USA, (2007)

== See also ==
- Garden roses
- Rose Hall of Fame
- List of Award of Garden Merit roses
