= Rosa 'Carefree Wonder' =

Shrub rose cultivar

Rosa 'Carefree Wonder
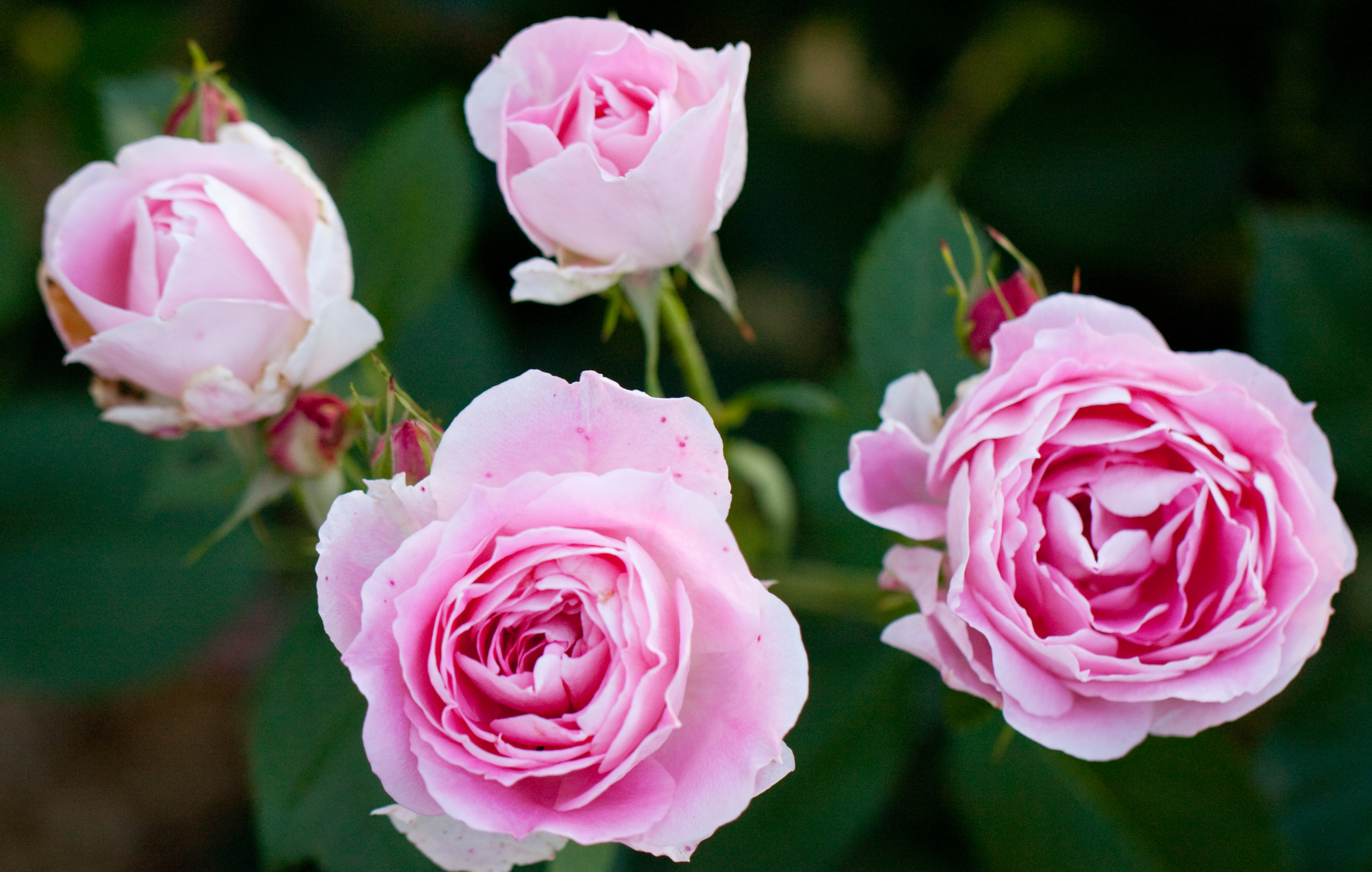
- Rosa 'Carefree Wonder'
- Genus: Rosa hybrid
- Hybrid parentage: ('Prairie Princess' x 'Nirvana') x ('Eyepaint' x 'Rustica')
- Cultivar group: Shrub rose
- Cultivar: MEIpitac
- Marketing names: 'Dynastie', 'Carefree Wonder'
- Breeder: Meilland
- Origin: France, 1990(

Rosa 'Carefree Wonder', (a.k.a. MEIpitac), is a shrub rose cultivar, bred by Allain Melland, of Meillaind rose growers, in France in 1990. The rose was named an All-America Rose Selections winner in 1991.

== Description ==
'Carefree Wonder' is a low growing bushy shrub, 3 to 4 ft (90—120 cm) in height with a 2 to 3 ft (60—90 cm) spread. Blooms have an average diameter of 4-5 in (10—12cm) with a petal count of 16 to 25, double petals. The flowers have a cupped form.

Flowers are bright pink with a white center, yellow stamens and white reverse, aging to medium pink. The blooms have a mild fragrance, and arrive singly or in tight clusters. The leaves are small, semi-glossy, medium-green and very healthy. "Carefree Wonder' is a profuse bloomer, blooming in flushes from spring to winter. The plant is very disease resistant and a repeat bloomer. It thrives in USDA zone 4 through 9.

== Awards ==
- All-America Rose Selections winner, USA, (1988)(

== See also ==
- Garden roses
- Rose Hall of Fame
- List of Award of Garden Merit roses
