= Rosa 'Seashell' =

Salmon-pink hybrid tea rose cultivar

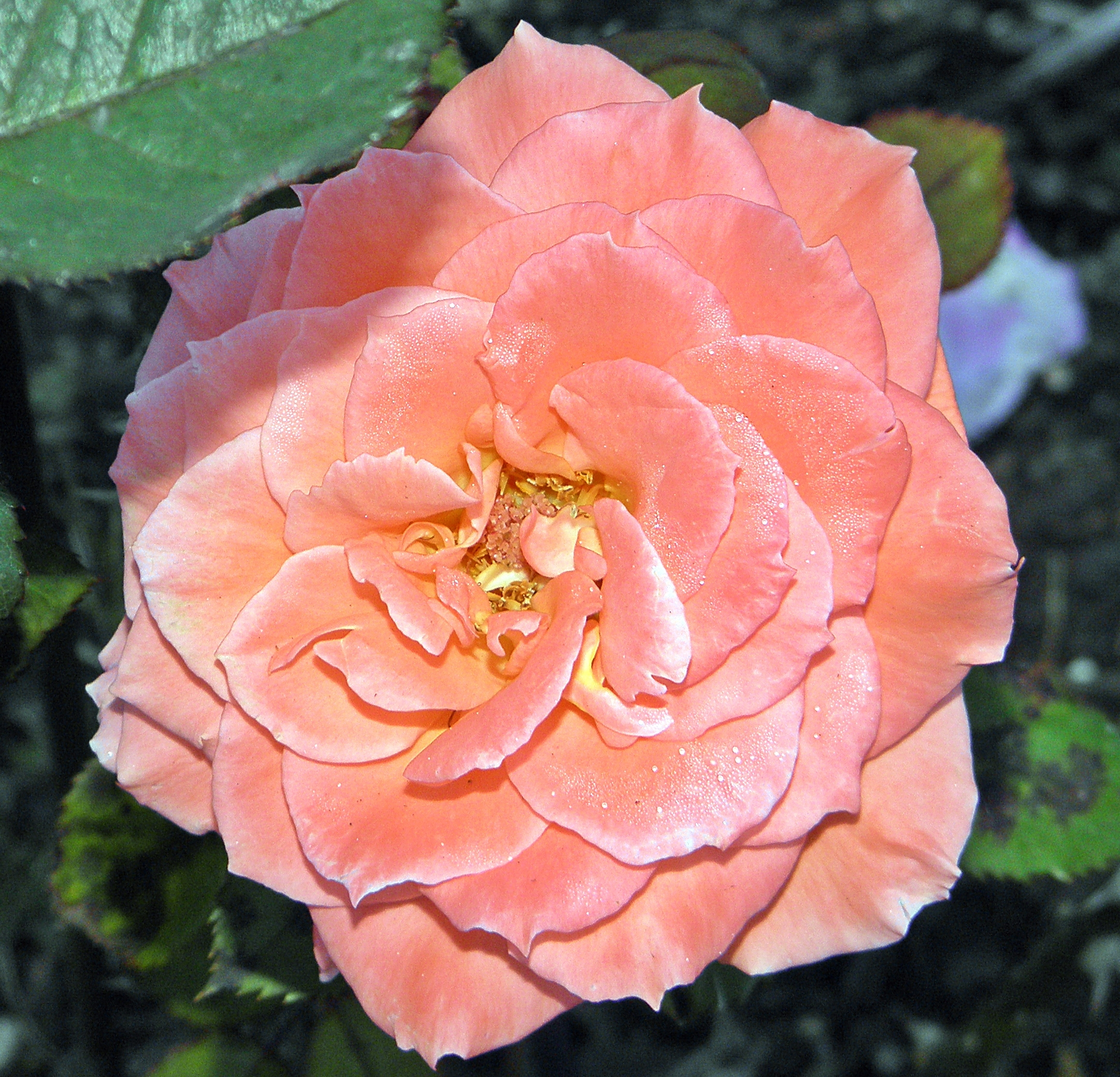
- Rosa 'Seashell'
- Genus: Rosa hybrid
- Hybrid parentage: Unnamed seedling x 'Colour Wonder'
- Cultivar group: Hybrid tea
- Cultivar: KORshel
- Breeder: Reimer Kordes
- Origin: Germany, 1976

Rosa 'Seashell', (a.k.a. KORshel), is a salmon-pink hybrid tea rose cultivar, bred by Reimer Kordes in Germany before 1976. The rose was introduced into the United States by Jackson & Perkins in 1976. The cultivar was named an All-America Rose Selections winner in 1976.

== Description ==
'Seashell' is a tall vigorous shrub, up to 4 ft (90 cm) in height with a 3 ft (90 cm) spread. Petals open almost flat and are typically 4 inches (10 cm) in diameter, with a medium-double bloom form of 17-25 petals. Flowers are orange when they first open, before turning a salmon-pink color, and finally fading to pale apricot pink. The rose has a mild fragrance. The flowers are borne singly and have a long bloom time. 'Seashell' is a disease resistant plant and thrives in USDA zone 4 and warmer. The foliage is large, healthy and dark green.

== Awards ==
- All-America Rose Selections winner, USA, (1976)

== See also ==
- Garden roses
- Rose Hall of Fame
- List of Award of Garden Merit roses
