= Rosa 'Brigadoon' =

Hybrid tea rose cultivar

Rosa 'Brigadoon
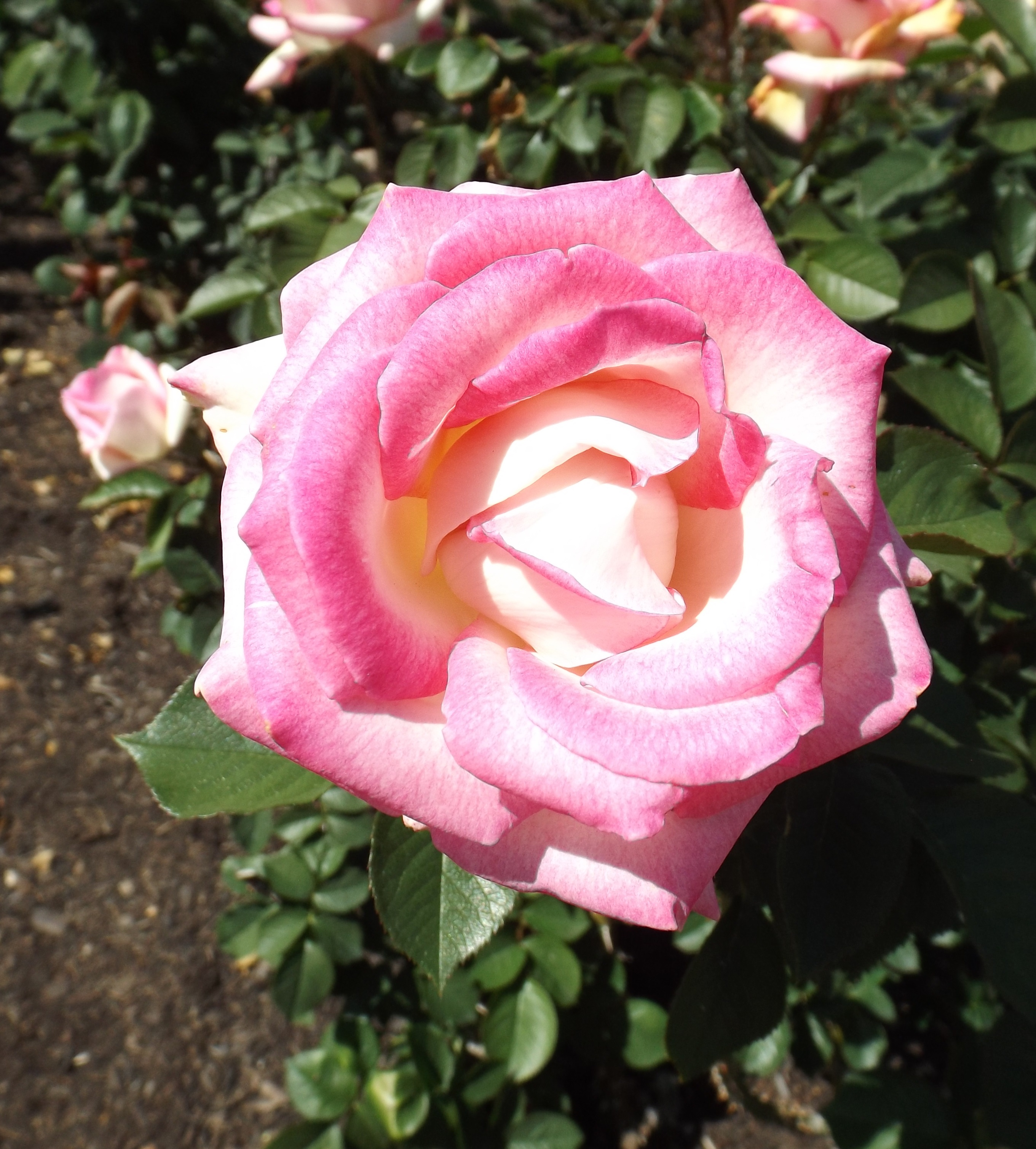
- Rosa 'Brigadoon'
- Genus: Rosa hybrid
- Hybrid parentage: 'Unnamed seedling' x 'Pristine'
- Cultivar group: Hybrid tea rose
- Cultivar: JACpal
- Breeder: Warriner
- Origin: United States, 1991

Rosa 'Brigadoon', (aka JACpal), is a hybrid tea rose cultivar, developed in 1991 by rose grower, William Warriner. The new rose variety was introduced into the United States by Jackson & Perkins in 1992. The rose was named an All-America Rose Selections winner in 1993.

== Description ==
'Brigadoon' is a medium-tall, upright shrub, 3 to 5 ft (90—150 cm) in height with a 2 to 3 ft (60—90 cm) spread. Blooms are 4—5 in (10—12cm) in diameter, with a petal count of 26 to 40 petals. The flowers have a high-centered, cupped, and reflexed form.

The bicolor flowers display various shades of red, coral, and orange with a white center and reverse. Flowers have a moderate, spicy fragrance, and are generally borne singly or in small clusters. The buds are long, pointed and ovoid. 'Rio Samba' blooms in flushes from spring to fall. Foliage is large, semi-glossy, leathery and dark green in color. The plant is disease resistant and a repeat bloomer. It thrives in USDA zone 6b and warmer.

== Awards ==
- All-America Rose Selections winner, USA, (1993)

== See also ==
- Garden roses
- Rose Hall of Fame
- List of Award of Garden Merit roses
