= Rosa 'Marina' =

Orange floribunda rose cultivar

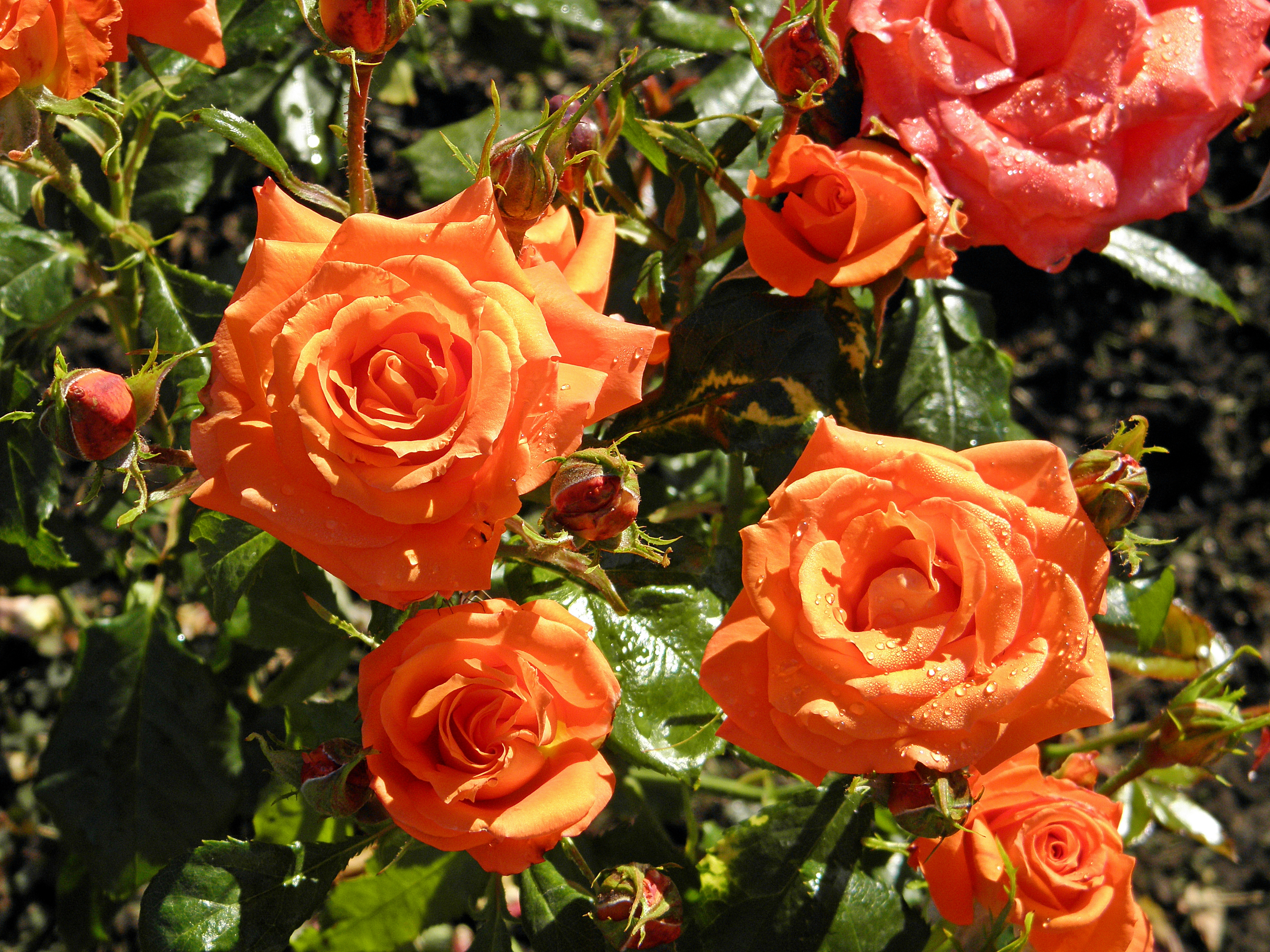
- Rosa 'Marina'
- Genus: Rosa hybrid
- Hybrid parentage: 'Colour Wonder' x 'Zorina'
- Cultivar group: Floribunda
- Cultivar: rinaKOR
- Breeder: Kordes
- Origin: Germany, 1979

Rosa 'Marina', (a.k.a. rinaKOR), is a floribunda rose cultivar. The rose variety was bred by Reimer Kordes in Germany in 1974 and introduced into Australia by Roy H. Rumsey Pty. Ltd. in 1979 as 'Marina'. The stock parents are the floribunda roses, 'Colour Wonder' and 'Zorina'. The rose was named an All-America Rose Selections winner in 1981.

== Description ==
'Marina' is a medium-tall upright shrub, 2 to 5 ft (60-150 cm) in height with a 2 to 3ft (60-90 cm) spread. Blooms are 2-3 in (5-7 cm) in diameter. Flowers have a mild scent, and have a medium, double (17-25 petals) bloom form. Buds are long and pointed. The flowers are orange and an orange blend color. The rose has a mild fragrance. Leaves are large, leathery and dark green, and susceptible to blackspot. The plant thrives in USDA zone 6b and warmer and blooms in flushes from spring to fall.

== Child plants ==
- Rosa 'Amorous', (1986), 'White Masterpiece' x 'Marina'
- Rosa 'Jim Dandy', (1988), 'Rise n Shine' x 'Marina'

== Awards ==
- All-America Rose Selections winner, USA, (1981)

== See also ==
- Garden roses
- Rose Hall of Fame
- List of Award of Garden Merit roses
