= Rosa 'Walking on Sunshine' =

Yellow floribunda rose cultivar

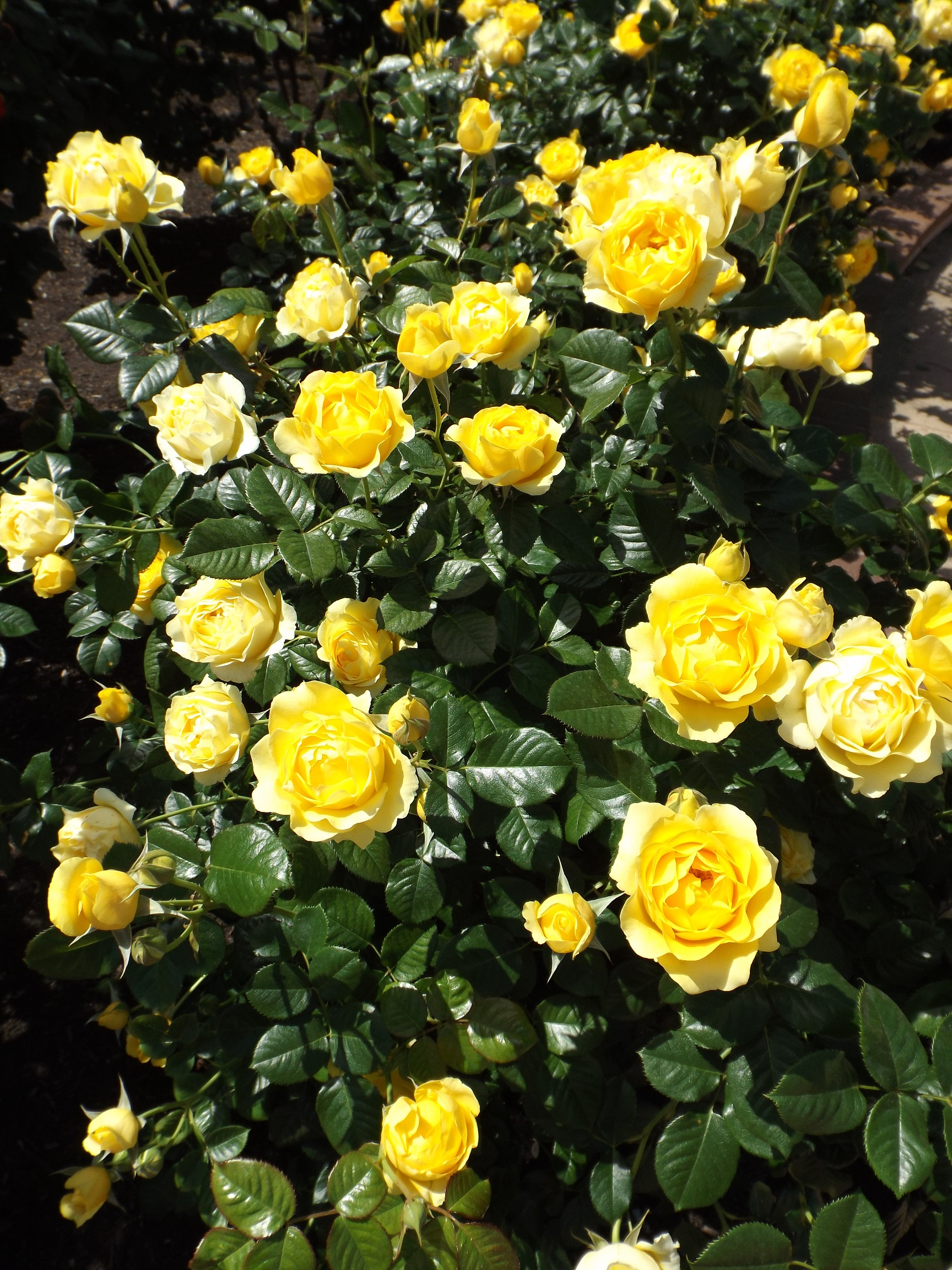
- Rosa 'Walking on Sunshine'
- Genus: Rosa hybrid
- Hybrid parentage: ('Sequoia Gold' x 'Baby Love') x ('Unnamed seedling' x 'Amber Queen')
- Cultivar group: Floribunda
- Cultivar: JACmcady
- Breeder: Zary
- Origin: United States, before 2010

Rosa 'Walking on Sunshine', (aka JACmcady ), is a yellow floribunda rose cultivar, bred by Dr. Keith Zary before 2010. The plant has won multiple awards, included being named an All-America Rose Selections (AARS) winner in 2011.

== Description ==
'Walking on Sunshine' is a medium, rounded, upright shrub, 3 to 4 ft (90–121 cm) in height with a 2 to 3 ft (60–91 cm) spread. Blooms are 3 in (7.6 cm) in diameter, with 26 to 40 petals. The plant bears small clusters of globular, ruffled flowers that open from pointed, ovoid buds. The flowers are bright yellow in color with pale yellow outer petals. The entire flower fades to light yellow as it ages. The rose has a moderate, anise fragrance and glossy, medium green foliage. It is very disease resistant and blooms in flushes throughout its growing season. The plants does well in USDA zone 6 and warmer.

== Awards ==
- All-America Rose Selections (AARS) winner, USA, (2011)
- Portland's Best Rose Winner, (2011)
- Portland Gold Medal Award Winner, (2015)

== See also ==
- Garden roses
- Rose Hall of Fame
- List of Award of Garden Merit roses
