= Rosa 'Bewitched' =

Bright pink rose cultivar

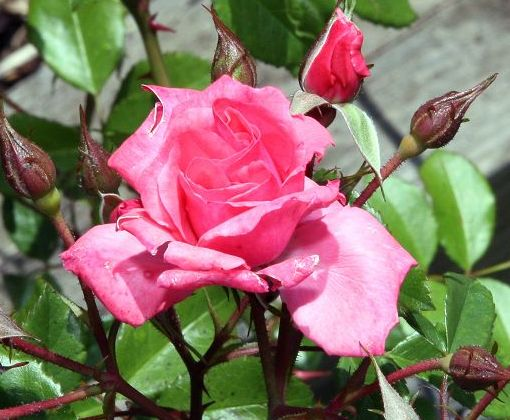
- Rosa 'Bewitched'
- Genus: Rosa hybrid
- Hybrid parentage: 'Queen Elizabeth' x 'Tawny Gold'
- Cultivar group: Hybrid tea rose
- Marketing names: 'Bewitched'
- Breeder: Dr. Walter Lammerts
- Origin: United States, 1967

Rosa 'Bewitched' is a medium pink Hybrid tea rose cultivar, bred by Dr. Walter Lammerts in 1967. The rose was introduced into the United States by the Germain Seed & Plant Company under the marketing name, 'Bewitched'. The cultivar was named an All-America Rose Selections in 1967. The stock parents of this rose are the Hybrid tea rose cultivars, 'Queen Elizabeth' and 'Tawny Gold'.

== Description ==
'Bewitched' is a medium-tall bushy shrub, up to 5 ft (150 cm) in height. Blooms are 5 in (12 cm) or more in diameter, with 27 to 40 petals. The rose has a moderate damask fragrance. The large, ruffled, high-centered petals are generally borne singly on long stems. The petals are bright pink in color, with slightly darker backs, and hold their color. Flowers grow largest in the cool weather. The shrub is a repeat bloomer, and is almost in continuous bloom in warm climates. The foliage resembles holly leaves, and is large, glossy, and medium green in color.

== Awards ==
- All-America Rose Selections winner, USA, (1967)
- Portland Gold Medal Winner, (1967)

== See also ==
- Garden roses
- Rose Hall of Fame
- List of Award of Garden Merit roses
