= Rosa 'Oregold' =

Golden yellow hybrid tea rose cultivar

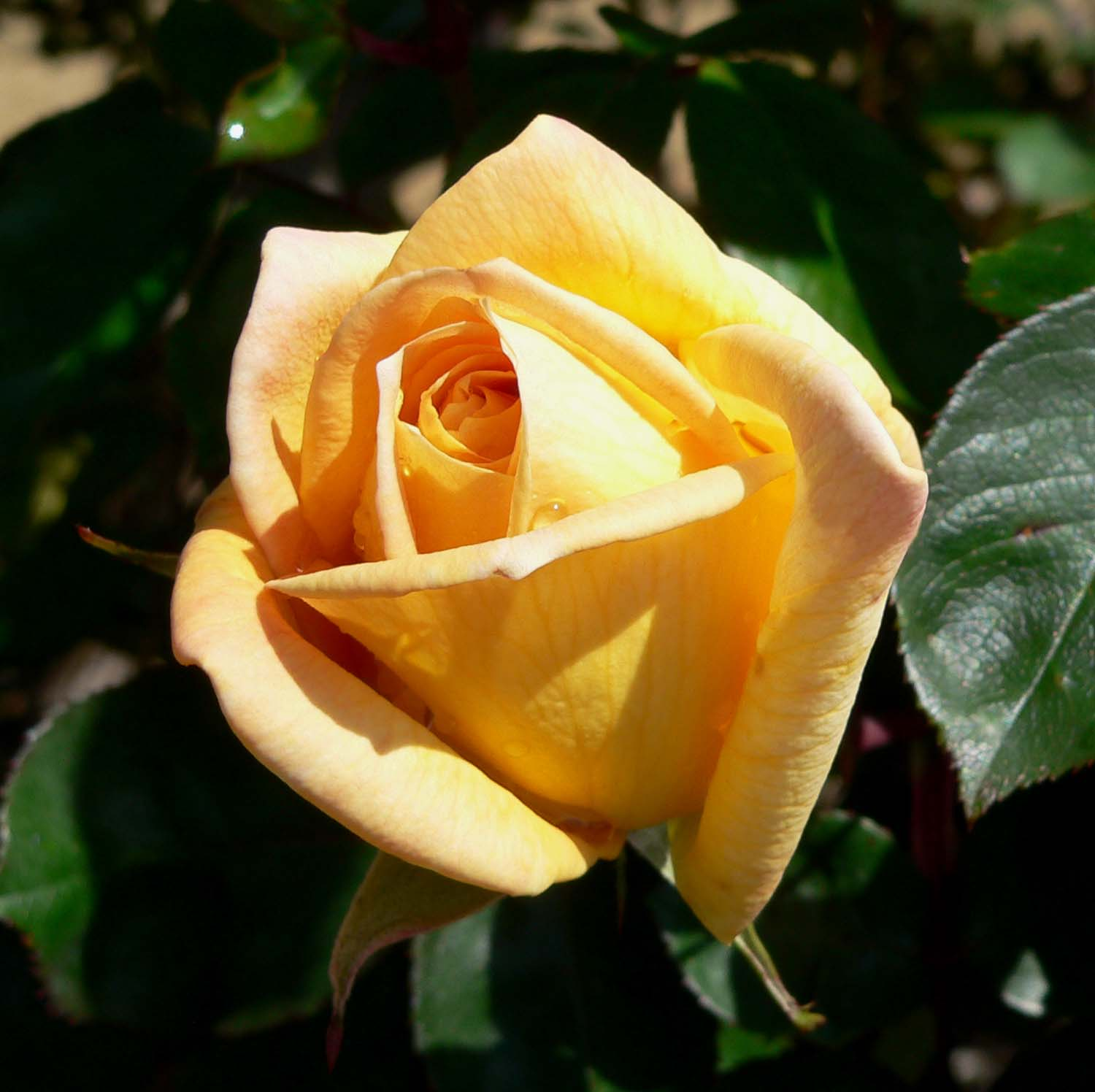
- Rosa 'Oregold'
- Genus: Rosa hybrid
- Hybrid parentage: 'Piccadilly' x 'Colour Wonder'
- Cultivar group: Hybrid tea
- Cultivar: TANolg
- Marketing names: 'Oregold', 'Tantau', 'Miss Harp', 'Anneliese Rothenberger'
- Breeder: Mathias Tantau, Jr
- Origin: Germany, 1971

Rosa 'Oregold', (a.k.a. TANolg), known in Germany as 'Anneliese Rothenberger', is a deep yellow hybrid tea rose cultivar, bred by Mathias Tantau, Jr. in Germany before 1971. The rose was named after the famous German opera singer, Anneliese Rothenberger (1924—2010). 'Oregold' is also known by the marketing names: 'Silhouette', 'Miss Harp', and 'Tantau'. The cultivar was named an All-America Rose Selections winner in 1975.

== Description ==
'Oregold' is a tall upright shrub, 5 to 7 ft (150–200 cm) in height with a 4 ft (120 cm) spread. Petals are typically 4-5 inches (10–12 cm), high-centered and full form with 16-25 petals. The flowers are very large at first with large buds and very long petals. Flowers are a golden yellow color, fading to buff. The color is best in cooler climates and seasons. The rose has a mild fruity fragrance. 'Oregold' is a disease resistant plant and thrives in USDA zones 6a through 10b. The plant blooms in flushes from spring through fall. The foliage is small and dark, glossy green.

== Child plant ==
Rosa 'Gentle Persuasion', (1984)

== Awards ==
- All-America Rose Selections winner, USA, (1975)

== See also ==
- Garden roses
- Rose Hall of Fame
- List of Award of Garden Merit roses
