= Rosa 'Sunshine Daydream' =

Light yellow rose cultivar

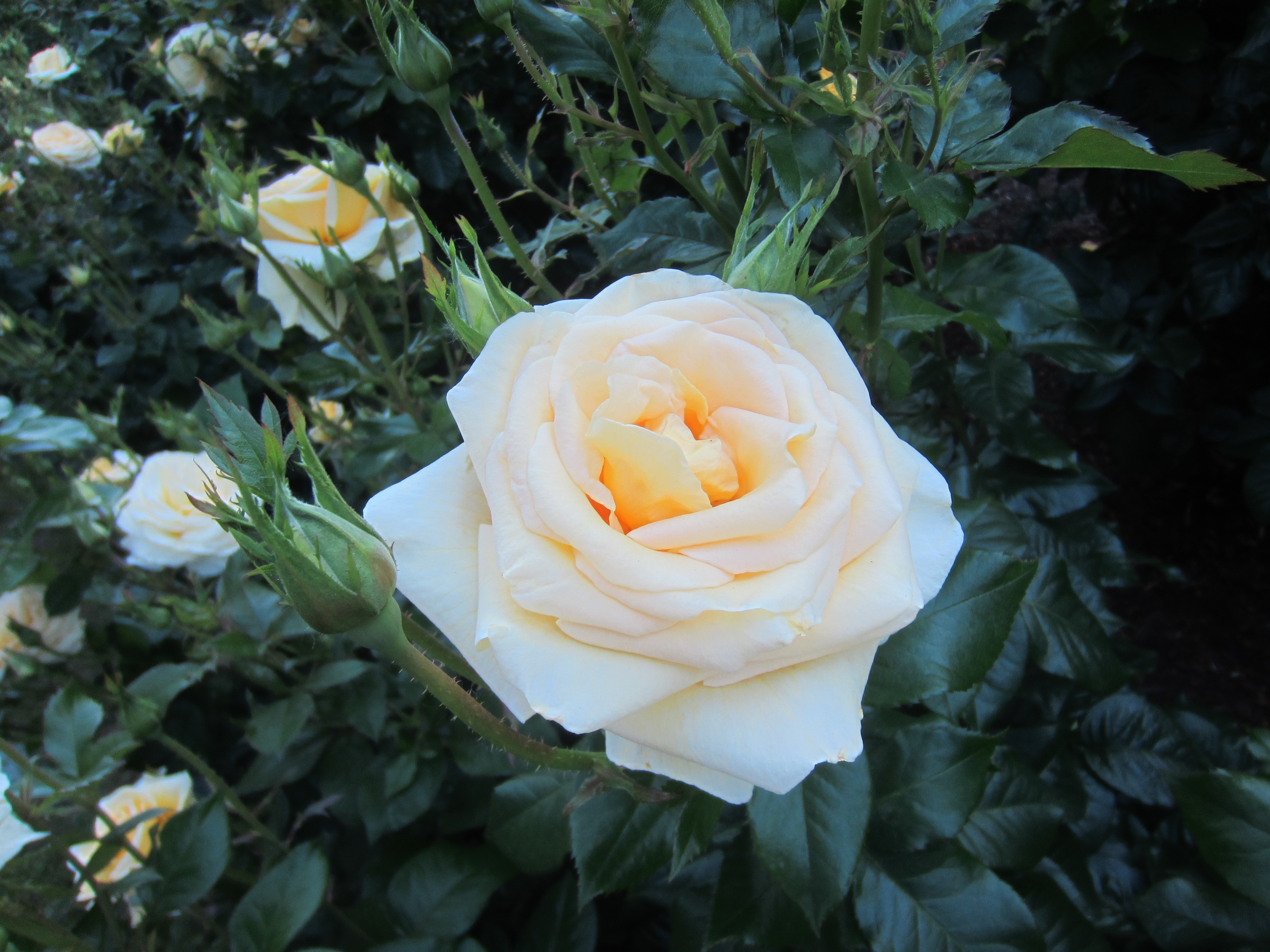
- Rosa 'Sunshine Daydream'
- Genus: Rosa hybrid
- Cultivar group: Grandiflora
- Cultivar: MEIkanaro
- Marketing names: 'Sunshine Daydream' 'Raffaello'
- Breeder: Meilland Richardier
- Origin: France, (2006)

Rosa 'Sunshine Daydream', (a.k.a. MEIkanaro), is a light yellow Grandiflora rose cultivar, bred by Michèle Meilland Richardier before 2006. It was named All-America Rose Selections in 2012.

== History ==
'Sunshine Daydream' was bred by Michèle Meilland Richardier before 2006. The rose was introduced into the United States by Regan Nursery in 2011. It was also introduced in Germany by BKN Strobel GmbH & Co. in 2013 as 'Raffaello'. Sunshine Daydream is the first rose of its class to win an All-America Rose Selections award with no spray cultivation.

== Description ==
'Sunshine Dream' is a tall upright shrub, 5 to 6 ft (152-182 cm) in height with a spread of 3 feet. Blooms are 3-4 in (7—10 cm) in diameter, with 33 to 35 petals. Blooms have a cupped to flat bloom shape and are butter yellow in color with lighter edges, maturing to a rich cream color. Flowers are borne singly or in small clusters.

== Awards ==
- All-America Rose Selections winner, USA, (2012)
- Biltmore Trials Award: The Honorable John Cecil Award for Open Group, 2013

== See also ==
- Garden roses
- Rose Hall of Fame
- List of Award of Garden Merit roses
