= Rosa 'Red Gold' =

Yellow and orange-red Floribunda rose cultivar

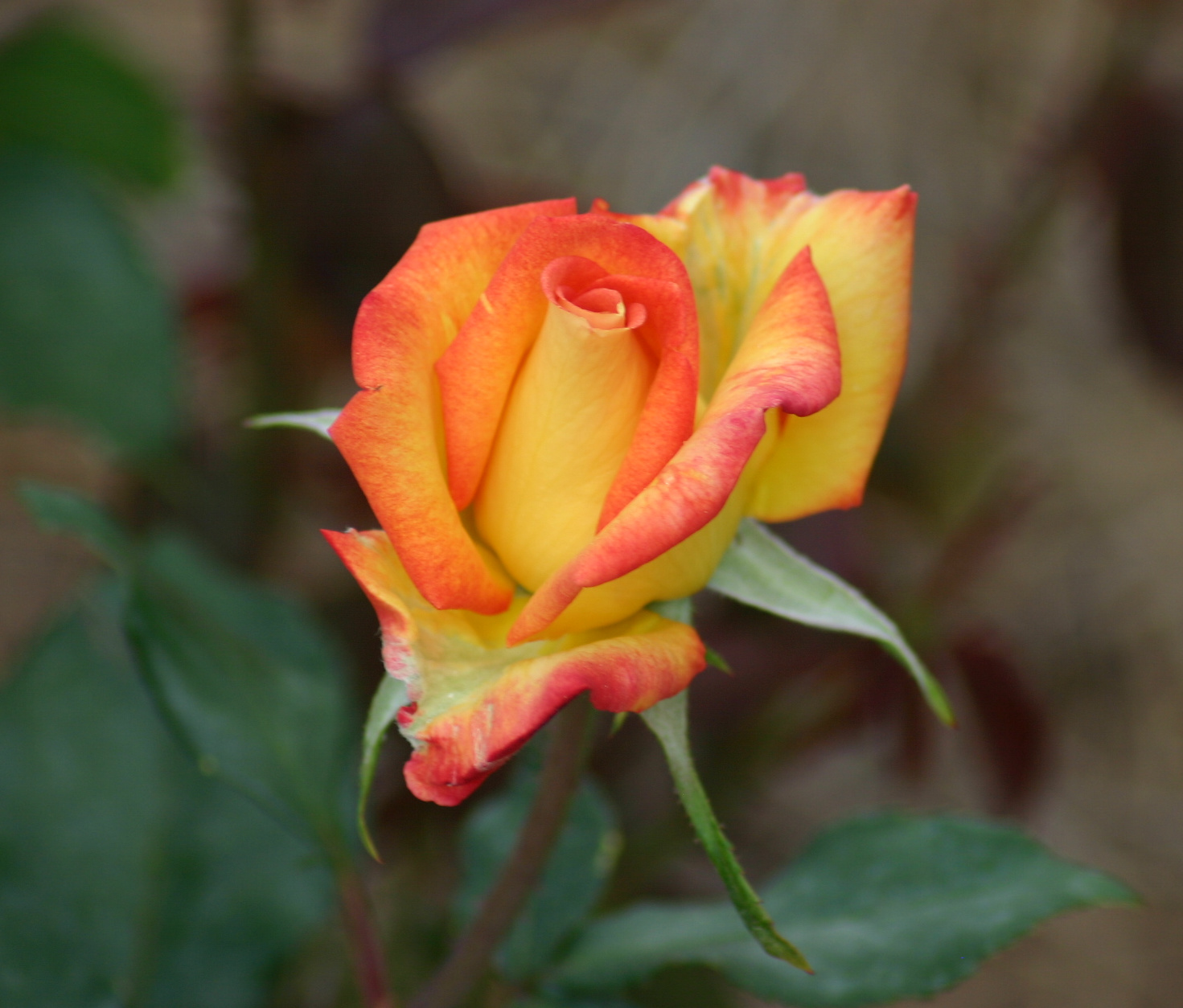
- Rosa 'Red Gold'
- Genus: Rosa hybrid
- Cultivar group: Floribunda
- Cultivar: DICor
- Marketing names: 'Red Gold', 'Rouge et Or', 'Redgold', 'Alinka'
- Breeder: Patrick Dickson
- Origin: Northern Ireland, 1971

Rosa 'Red Gold', (aka DICor) is a bicolor, yellow and red-orange Floribunda rose cultivar. Bred by Patrick Dickson in Northern Ireland in 1967, and the plant was introduced into Australia in 1968 and the United States in 1971. 'Red Gold' is also known by the marketing names: 'Redgold', 'Rouge et Or', 'Dicor', and 'Alinka'. The cultivar was named an All-America Rose Selections winner in 1971.

== History ==
Dickson Roses was established in 1836 by Alexander Dickson, who migrated from Perth, Scotland to Newtownards, County Down in Northern Ireland. Alexander's son, George, and George's two sons, Alexander II and George II, began a rose breeding program at the company in 1879. Alexander Patrick (Patrick) Dickson (1926-2012), started working for Dickson Roses in 1957 and began breeding roses for the company in 1958. During his career, he introduced many successful rose varieties, including Rosa 'Sea Pearl' (1964), Rosa 'Grandpa Dickson' (1966), Rosa 'Red Devil' and Rosa 'Precious Platinum' (1974).

Dickson bred 'Red Gold' in 1967 in Northern Ireland. The cultivar is a hybrid of Rosa 'Karl Herbst x Rosa 'Masquerade' and Rosa 'Faust'. It was introduced into Australia in 1968 and the United States in 1971 as 'Red Gold'. The cultivar was named an All-America Rose Selections winner in 1971.

== Description ==
'Red Gold' is an upright, bushy shrub, 3 to 4 ft (91–121 cm) in height with a 2–3 ft (60–91 cm) spread. Petals are typically 4-5 inches (10–12 cm) in diameter. From late spring to autumn, the plant bears clusters of mildly fragrant double flowers. Flower colour is a yellow blend with orange-red edges. 'Red Gold' is a disease resistant, vigorous plant, and thrives in USDA zone, 6 and warmer. The plant blooms in flushes from spring through fall. The plant has thorny stems. The foliage is small and dark, glossy green.

== Awards ==
- All-America Rose Selections winner, USA, (1971)

== See also ==
- Garden roses
- Rose Hall of Fame
- List of Award of Garden Merit roses
