= Rosa 'Royal Highness' =

Light pink rose cultivar

Rosa 'Duet'
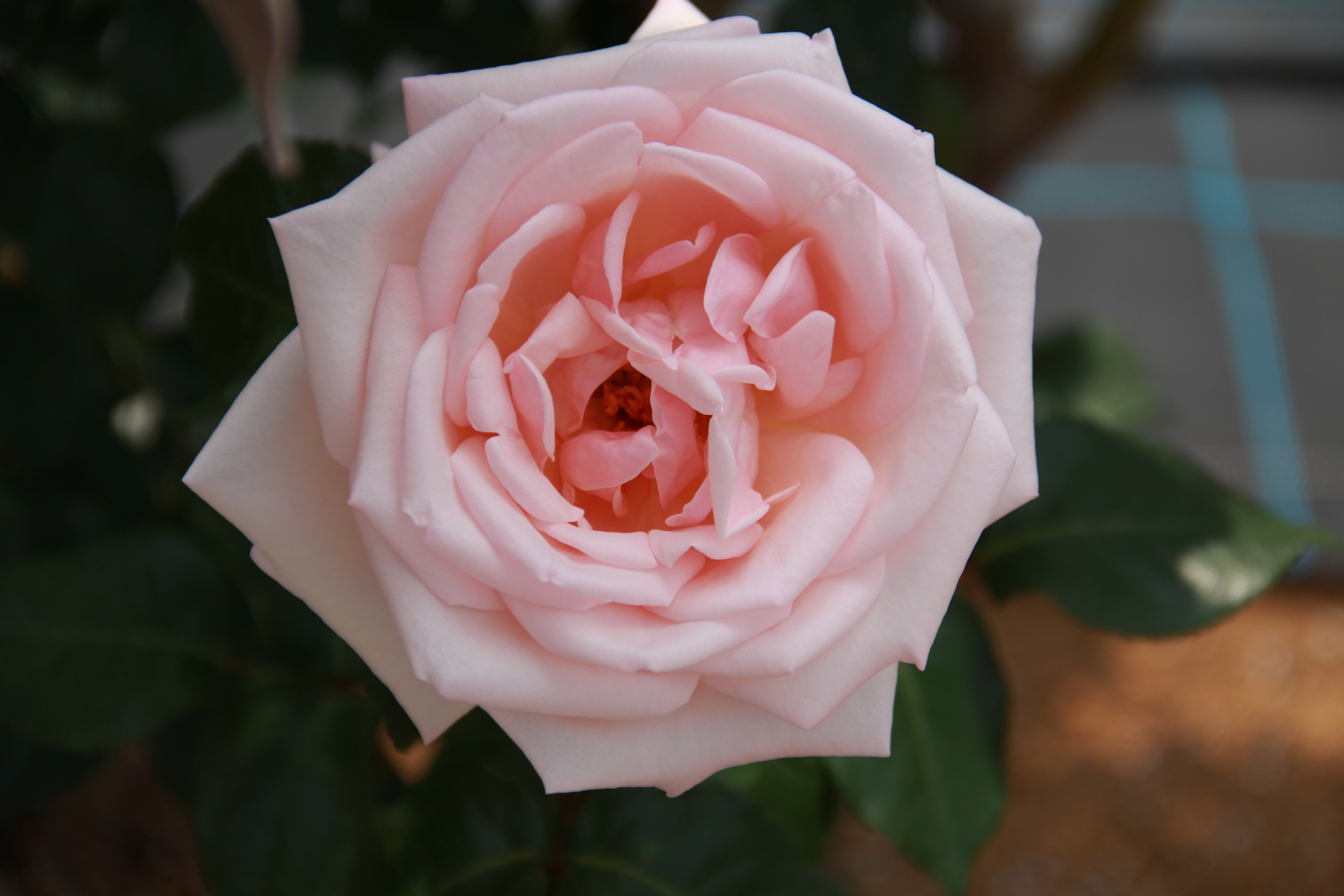
- Rosa 'Royal Highness'
- Genus: Rosa hybrid
- Hybrid parentage: 'Virgo' x 'Mme A. Meilland'
- Cultivar group: Hybrid tea rose
- Marketing names: 'Royal Highness', 'Konigliche Hoheit'
- Breeder: Swim & Weeks
- Origin: United States, 1961

Rosa 'Royal Highness' is a light pink hybrid tea rose cultivar. Bred by Herbert Swim and Weeks Rose Growers in 1961, the rose was named an All-America Rose Selections winner in 1963. The rose was introduced into the United States by Star Roses in 1962. The stock parents are the hybrid tea roses, 'Virgo' and 'Mme A. Meilland' ('Peace').

== Description ==
'Royal Highness' is a medium-tall upright shrub, 4 to 6 ft (121-182 cm) in height with a 2 to 3 ft (60-91 cm) spread. Blooms are 4-5 in (10-12 cm) in diameter, with 40 to 45 petals. The rose has a strong and sweet fragrance.

The petals "are creamy white with pink undersides, and the exquisite shade of palest pink comes from the shadows that form between the opening petals." Blooms are large, high-centered, very full and grow singly on long stems. The petals fall apart quickly in rain. The buds are long and pointed in form. The plant does best in hot climates. The leaves are large, glossy, dark green and leathery. The plant is disease resistant and grows best in USDA zone 6b and warmer.

== Child plants ==
- Rosa 'Shinju'(1976)

== Awards ==
- Portland Gold Medal Award (1961)
- Madrid Gold Medal (1962)
- All-America Rose Selections winner, USA, (1963)

== See also ==
- Garden roses
- Rose Hall of Fame
- List of Award of Garden Merit roses
