= Rosa 'Honey Perfume' =

Apricot yellow floribunda rose cultivar

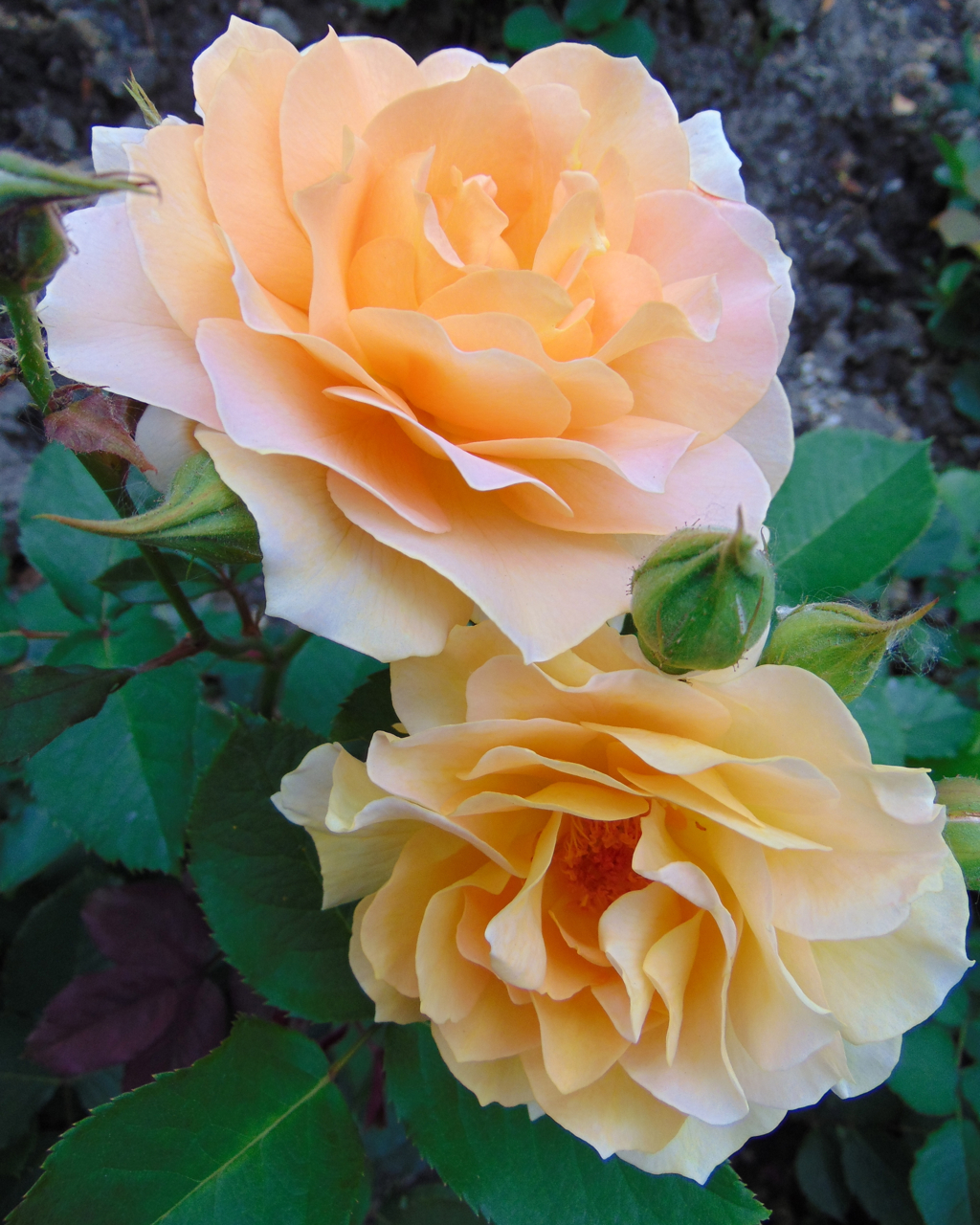
- Rosa 'Honey Perfume'
- Genus: Rosa hybrid
- Hybrid parentage: 'AROfres' x 'Amber Queen'
- Cultivar group: Floribunda
- Cultivar: JACarque
- Breeder: Zary
- Origin: United States, 1993

Rosa 'Honey Perfume', (a.k.a. JACarque), is an apricot yellow floribunda rose cultivar, bred by Dr. Keith Zary in 1993, and introduced into the United States by Jackson & Perkins in 2004. The rose was named an All-America Rose Selections winner in 2004.

== Description ==
'Honey Perfume' is a medium compact upright shrub, 4 to 5 ft (121—151 cm) in height with a 2 to 3 ft (60—90 cm) spread. Blooms are medium-large, 4—5 in (10—12 cm) in diameter, with a ruffled, double bloom form, and a petal count of 26 to 40. The flowers are a yellow-apricot blend, that fades to almost white as blooms age. The rose has a strong, spicy fragrance and large, glossy, dark green foliage. 'Honey Perfume' is disease resistant. It blooms continuously from spring through fall. The plants does well in USDA zone 6 and warmer.

== Awards ==
- All-America Rose Selections (AARS) winner, USA, (2004)

== See also ==
- Garden roses
- Rose Hall of Fame
- List of Award of Garden Merit roses
