= Rosa 'Diamond Jubilee' =

Light yellow rose cultivar

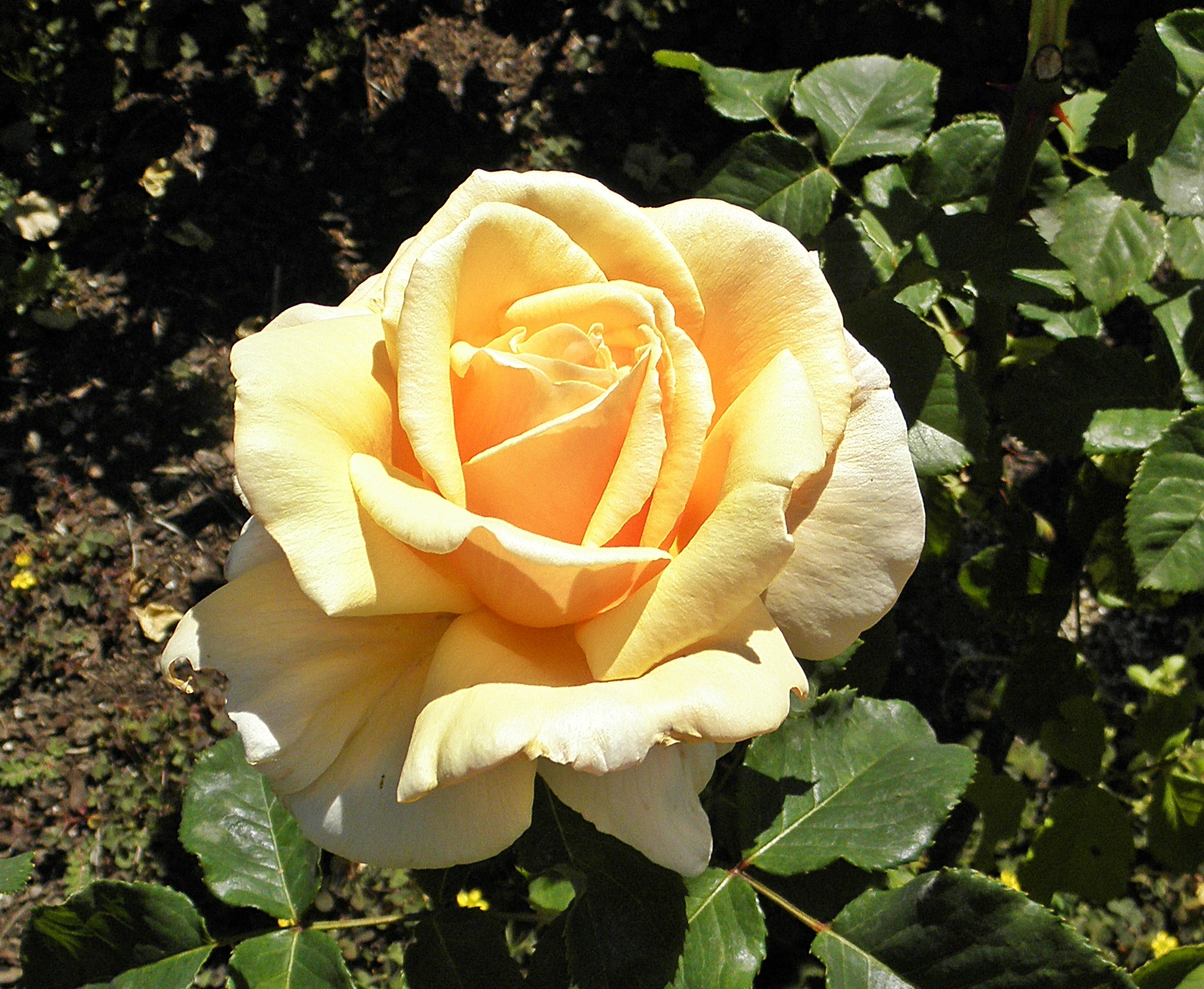
- Rosa 'Diamond Jubilee'
- Genus: Rosa hybrid
- Hybrid parentage: 'Maréchal Niel' x 'Feu Pernet-Ducher'
- Cultivar group: Hybrid tea rose
- Marketing names: 'Diamond Jubilee'
- Breeder: Boerner
- Origin: United States, 1947

Rosa 'Diamond Jubilee' is a light yellow Hybrid tea rose developed in the United States in 1947 by Gene Boerner. The cultivar was named All-America Rose Selections (AARS) winner in 1948.

== History ==
'Diamond Jubilee' was created by Eugene Boerner, director of the rose breeding program at Jackson & Perkins in America to celebrate the 75th anniversary of the company. The cultivar's stock parents are the Noisette, 'Maréchal Niel' and Hybrid tea rose, Feu Pernet-Ducher. Jackson & Perkins introduced the rose in the US in 1947. The cultivar was introduced in Australia by Hazlewood Bros. Nursery in 1950 as 'Diamond Jubilee'.

== Description ==
'Diamond Jubilee' is a medium upright shrub, 3 to 4.3 ft (91–130 cm) in height with a 2 ft (60 cm) spread. Blooms are 4-5 in (10-12 cm) in diameter, and generally have 26 to 40 petals. Flowers are high-centered with a moderate to strong fragrance. Blooms are light yellow or pale gold in color with an apricot reverse, fading to cream at the edges. 'Diamond Jubilee' is very disease resistant and a good repeat bloomer. The optimal growing zone is United States Department of Agriculture USDA zone 6 and warmer. The flowers fall apart in the rain.

== Awards ==
All-America Rose Selections, (1948)

== See also ==
- Garden roses
- Rose Hall of Fame
- List of Award of Garden Merit roses
