= Rosa 'Tournament of Roses' =

Pink grandiflora rose cultivar

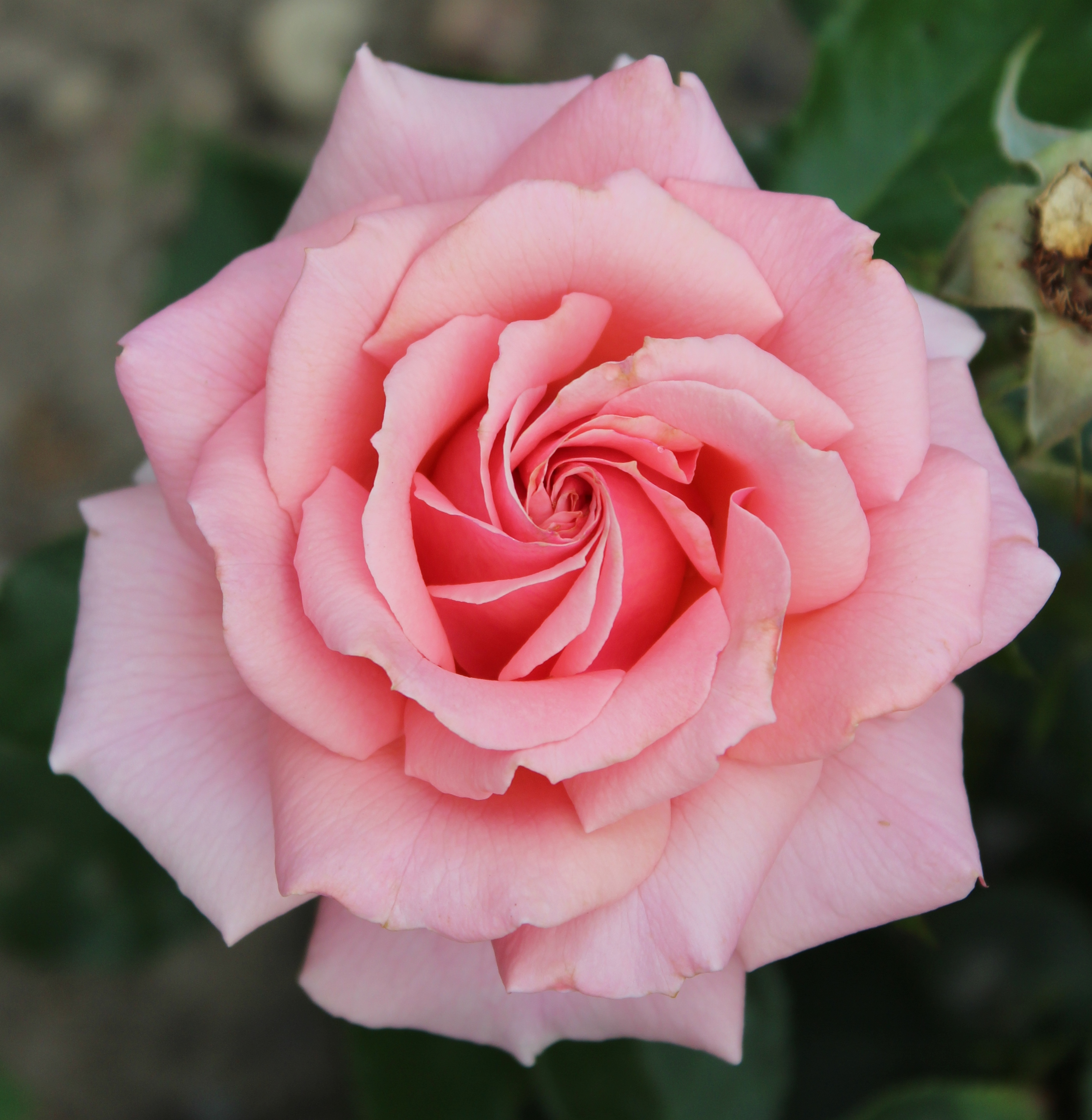
- Rosa 'Tournament of Roses'
- Genus: Rosa hybrid
- Hybrid parentage: 'Impatient' x 'Unnamed seedling'
- Cultivar group: Grandiflora
- Cultivar: JACient
- Marketing names: 'Tournament of Roses' 'Berkeley, 'Poesie'
- Breeder: Warriner
- Origin: United States, 1988

Rosa 'Tournament of Roses', (a.k.a. JACient), is a grandiflora rose cultivar, bred by William Warriner, and introduced into the United States by Jackson & Perkins in 1988. The rose was named for the Tournament of Roses flower festival and parade held annually in Pasadena, California. The cultivar was named an All-America Rose Selections winner in 1989.

== Description ==
'Tournament of Roses' is a medium-tall upright shrub, 3 to 5 ft (90–150 cm) in height with a 2 to 3 ft (60–90 cm) spread. Blooms have an average diameter of 3.5 in (8.89 cm) with a petal count of 25 to 30. Flowers are medium to large and full, typically borne on long stems, in small clusters. The flowers bloom continuously from spring to fall. Flowers are different shades of pink: dark pink at the center, pale pink at the edges, and darker pink on the backs of the petals. The buds are ovoid and pointed. Flowers are borne on long stems, in small clusters of five to seven, and have a mild, sweet fragrance USDA. 'Tournament of Roses' produces flowers into winter in warmer climates, growing best in USDA zone 7a and warmer. It is one of the best roses for resistance to blackspot, mildew and rust.

== Child plants ==
'Tournament of Roses' was used to hybridize the following rose varieties:

- Rosa 'Candelabra', (1998)
- Rosa 'First Impression', (2008)
- Rosa 'Miss Behavin', (1998)
- Rosa 'Nancy Reagan', (2004)
- Rosa 'Pure Poetry', (1998)
- Rosa 'Voluptuous', (2005)

== Awards ==
- All-America Rose Selections winner, USA, (1989)

== See also ==
- Garden roses
- Rose Hall of Fame
- List of Award of Garden Merit roses
