= Rosa 'Secret' =

Hybrid tea rose cultivar

Rosa 'Secret
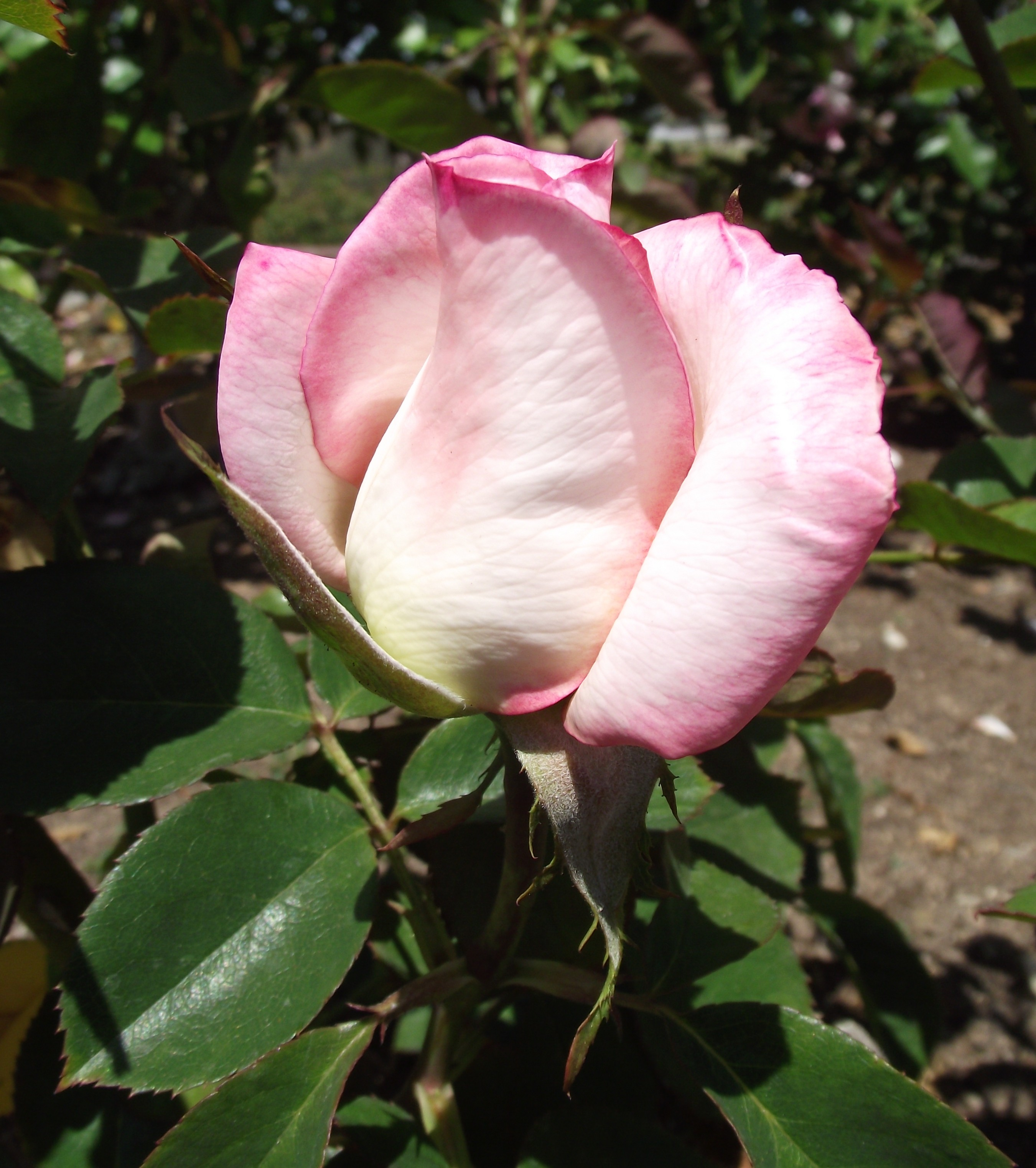
- Rosa 'Secret'
- Genus: Rosa hybrid
- Hybrid parentage: 'Pristine' x 'Friendship'
- Cultivar group: Hybrid tea
- Cultivar: HILaroma
- Breeder: Tracy
- Origin: United States, 1992

Rosa 'Secret', (a.k.a. HILaroma), is a pink and white hybrid tea rose cultivar, bred before 1992 by Daniel Tracy. The new rose variety was introduced into the United States by Star Roses in 1994. The rose was named an All-America Rose Selections winner in 1994.

== Description ==
'Secret' is a medium-tall bushy shrub, 3 to 5 ft (91–152 cm) in height with a 2 to 3 ft (60–90 cm) spread. Blooms are 4—5 in (10–12 cm) in diameter, with a petal count of 26 to 40. Bloom form is high-centered and cupped. Flowers are a pink and white bicolor, and considered to be the most appealing as the bud opens, a very pretty white with pink edges. Flowers have a strong, spicy fragrance, and are generally borne singly or in small clusters. The plant is a vigorous, blooming in flushes from spring to autumn. The shrub has very few prickles, and medium-sized, dark green, glossy leaves. It is disease resistant, and thrives in USDA zone 7b and warmer.

== Sports and child plants ==
- Rosa 'Karen Ann', (before 2015)
- Rosa 'Pope John Paul II', (before 2006)
- Rosa 'Secret's Out', sport, (before 2009)

== Awards ==
- All-America Rose Selections winner, USA, (1994)
- Portland Gold Medal, (1998)

== See also ==
- Garden roses
- Rose Hall of Fame
- List of Award of Garden Merit roses
