= Rosa 'Livin' Easy' =

Apricot-blend floribunda rose cultivar

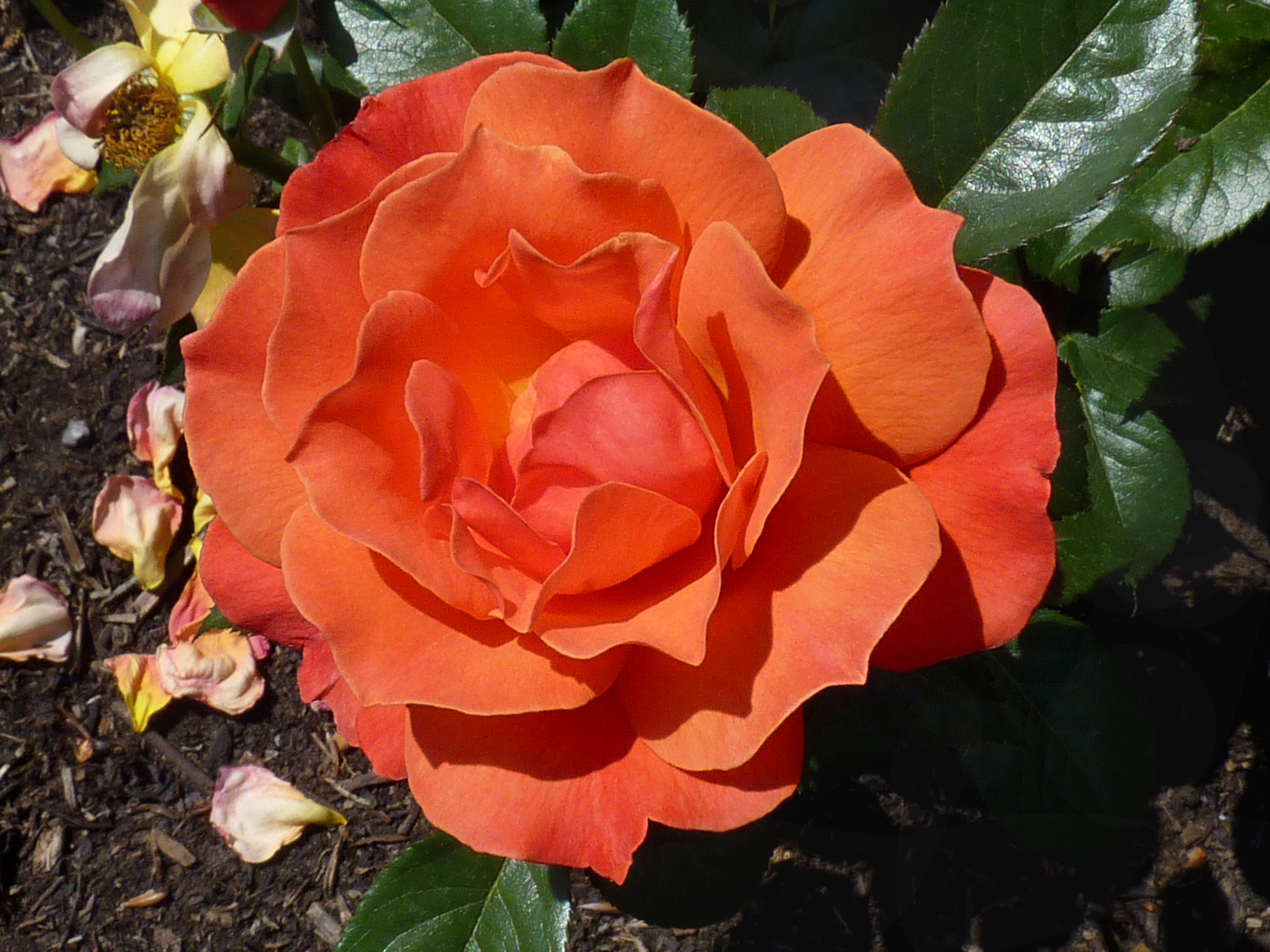
- Rosa 'Livin' Easy'
- Genus: Rosa hybrid
- Hybrid parentage: 'Southampton' x 'Remember Me'
- Cultivar group: Floribunda
- Cultivar: HARwelcome
- Marketing names: 'Fellowship, 'Livin' Easy'
- Breeder: Jack Harkness
- Origin: Great Britain, 1992

Rosa 'Livin' Easy', (aka HARwelcome), is a floribunda rose cultivar, bred by Jack Harkness. It was introduced into the United States by Weeks Roses in 1992 as 'Fellowship'. The rose was named an All-America Rose Selections winner in 1996.

== Description ==
'Livin' Easy' is a medium bushy, upright shrub, 3 to 5 ft (91–151 cm) in height with a 3 to 4 ft (91–121 cm) spread. Blooms are 4—5 in (10–12 cm) in diameter, with a petal count of 26 to 40. Bloom form is cupped, flat to cupped, and ruffled. Flowers are orange or an apricot-blend, displaying various shades of pink, apricot and orange, with unusual copper colored petal backs. Flowers also have dark pink petal edges and cream or yellow centers. Blooms have a moderate, citrus fragrance, and are generally borne singly, or in small clusters. The plant is vigorous, blooming in flushes from spring through fall. The shrub has medium-sized, glossy, medium-green, dense, leathery foliage. The plant is prone to blackspot and spiky prickles. It grows well in many climates, and is considered an ideal rose for massed plantings.

== Sports and child plants ==
'Livin' Easy' was used to hybridize the following rose varieties:

- Rosa 'Bon Appetit', (2013)
- Rosa 'Easy Going', sport, (1996)
- Rosa 'Emma Haftl', (2014)
- Rosa 'Honey Nectar', (2001)
- Rosa 'Hot Cocoa', (2002)

== Awards ==
- Royal National Rose Society (RNRS) Gold Medal, (1990)
- All-America Rose Selections (AARS) winner, USA, (1996)

== See also ==
- Garden roses
- Rose Hall of Fame
- List of Award of Garden Merit roses
