= Rosa 'Cinco de Mayo' =

Floribunda rose cultivar

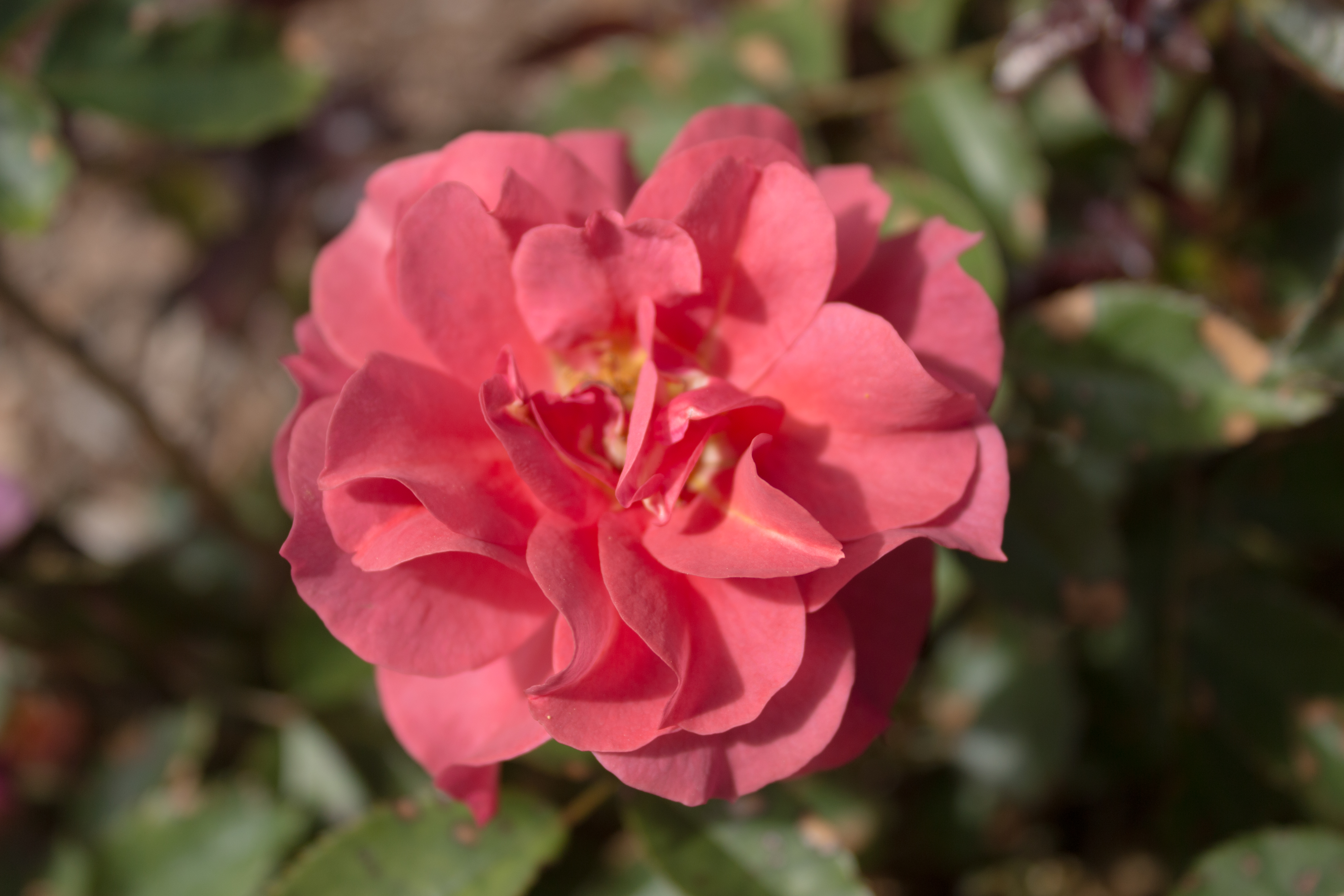
- Rosa 'Cinco de Mayo'
- Genus: Rosa hybrid
- Hybrid parentage: 'Topsy Turvy' x 'Julia Child'
- Cultivar group: Floribunda
- Cultivar: Wekcobeju
- Marketing names: 'The Shire' 'Cinco de Mayo' 'Celebration Time'
- Breeder: Carruth
- Origin: United States, 2006

Rosa 'Cinco de Mayo', (aka Wekcobeju ), is a floribunda rose cultivar, bred by Tom Carruth in 2006. The rose was introduced into the United States by Weeks Rose Growers in 2009 as 'Cinco de Mayo'. The plant was created from a hybridization of floribunda cultivars, 'Topsy Turvy' and 'Julia Child'. The cultivar was introduced into New Zealand by Matthews Nurseries Ltd in 2013 as 'The Shire', and was named an All-America Rose Selections winner in 2009.

== Description ==
'Cinco de Mayo' is a medium upright bushy, and quaint shrub, 3 to 4 ft (90—121 cm) in height with a 3 to 4 ft (90—121 cm) spread. Blooms are medium, 2—3 in (5—7.5 cm) in diameter, with 20 to 25 petals. The plant bears small clusters of double ruffled flowers that open from long, pointed buds. The flowers are rusty-red orange, with shades of smoky lavender. The rose has a mild fragrance and glossy, dark green foliage. 'Cinco de Mayo' is very disease resistant. It blooms in flushes from spring through fall. The plants does well in USDA zone 5 to 9.

== Awards ==
- All-America Rose Selections (AARS) winner, USA, (2009)

== See also ==
- Garden roses
- Rose Hall of Fame
- List of Award of Garden Merit roses
