= Rosa 'Easy Does It' =

Floribunda rose cultivar

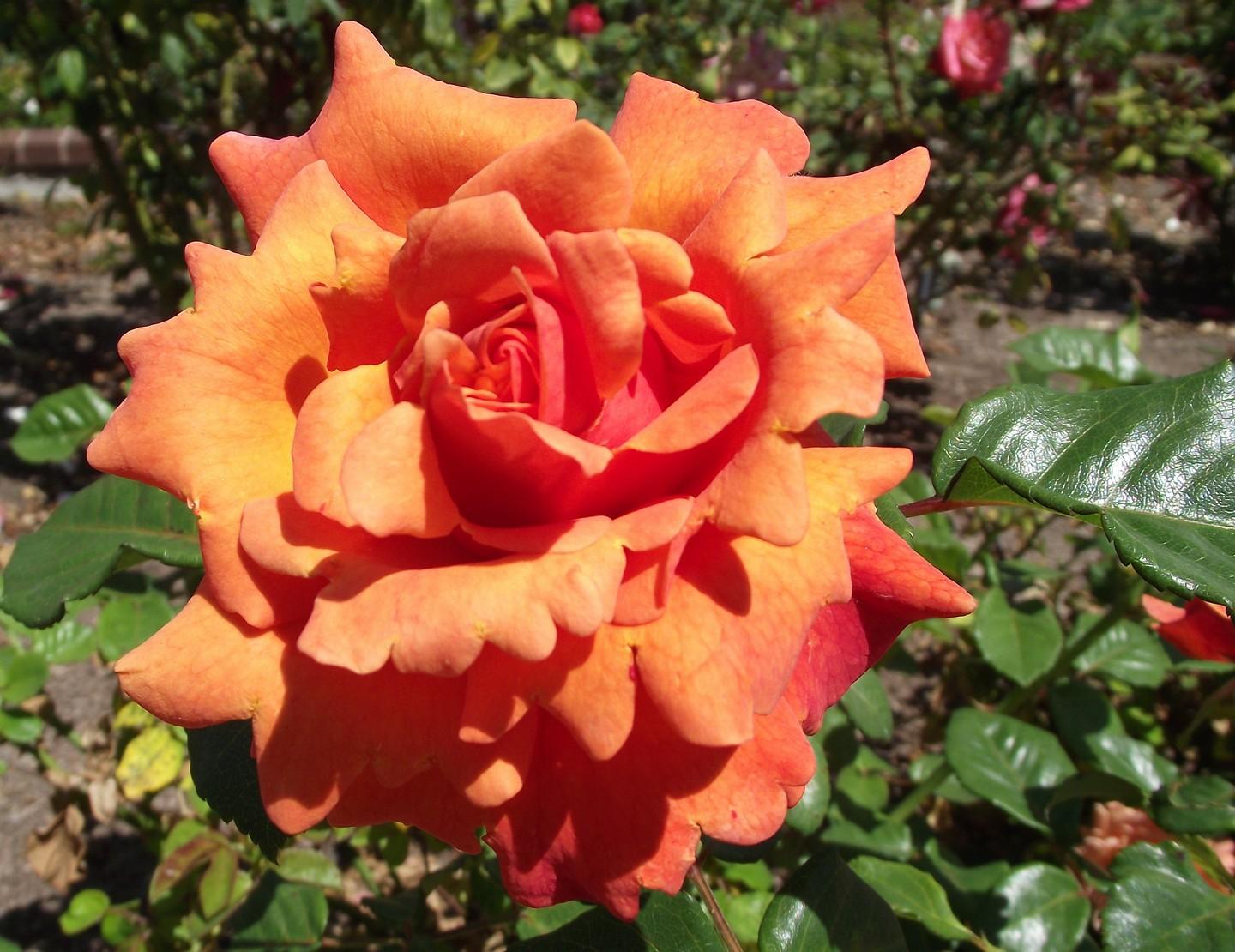
- Rosa 'Easy Does It'
- Genus: Rosa hybrid
- Hybrid parentage: ('Queen Charlotte' x 'Della Balfour') x 'Baby Love'
- Cultivar group: Floribunda
- Cultivar: HARpageant
- Marketing names: 'Easy Does It', 'Firestar', 'Steinfurther Abendsonne'
- Breeder: Harkness
- Origin: Great Britain, before 2006

Rosa 'Easy Does It', (a.k.a. HARpageant ), is a floribunda rose cultivar, bred by Jack Harkness before 2006. The new rose variety was created from the hybridization of stock parents, 'Queen Charlotte', 'Della Balfour' and 'Baby Love'. It was named an All-America Rose Selections winner in 2010.

== Description ==
'Easy Does It' is a medium bushy, upright shrub, 3 to 4 ft (90–121 cm) in height with a 2 to 3 ft (60–91 cm) spread. Blooms are large, 4—5 in (10—12.7 cm) in diameter, with 26 to 40 petals. The plant bears small clusters of cupped, ruffled or scalloped flowers that open from long, ovoid buds. The flowers display various shades of orange-apricot to golden-pink, eventually fading to pink. The rose has a moderate, fruity fragrance and medium-sized glossy, light green foliage. 'Easy Does It' is very disease resistant and blooms continuously throughout its growing season. The plants does well in USDA zone 6 and warmer.

== Awards ==
- All-America Rose Selections (AARS) winner, USA, (2010)

== See also ==
- Garden roses
- Rose Hall of Fame
- List of Award of Garden Merit roses
