= Los Villains =

Los Angeles punk-rock band

Los Villains was an American punk rock band from Whittier, California formed in 1989. The band’s original two drummer lineup included Louis Pérez III on vocals and guitar, Anthony Todaro and Vincent Hidalgo on guitar, with William Harrigan on bass. On drums David Hidalgo Jr., who is best known as a member of Social Distortion and The Drips. Also on drums, Alfredo Ortiz, who is best known as the percussionist for the Beastie Boys and current drummer for Los Lobos. Los Villains is known for being part of East Los Angeles’ punk rock scene.

== History ==
Initially Los Villains was formed by Pérez, who is a current member of Manic Hispanic, and the son of Los Lobos guitarist and percussionist Louie Pérez. Vincent and David Hidalgo Jr., are sons of Los Lobos frontman David Hidalgo. The band opened for Los Lobos on several occasions.

Los Villains released their first album, Punk Rock Pow-Wow, in 2000. It was produced by Paul du Gré who engineered Bad Religion’s Recipe for Hate. Los Villains also contributed a track on the tribute album Along the Way: A Tribute to Bad Religion, which was released in 2000.

They also did a cover of the song “Chalk Dust Torture” on the compilation album, Sharin’ the Groove: Celebrating the Music of Phish, released in 2001 which featured David Hidalgo on lead guitar.

In 2001, Los Villains also performed at the Rock With a Cause concert at Salon Corona, which was organized by Al Borde to raise relief funds for people affected by earthquakes in El Salvador. The band also performed at the Street Scene music festival in the same year.

Los Villains performed with The Adolescents and T.S.O.L. at the House of Blues in 2002, a concert where two people were shot backstage during a dispute.

The band released the two song 7”, 45 rpm vinyl single Cinco de Mayo in 2003.

== Members ==
- Louis Perez III – vocals, guitar
- Anthony Todaro – guitar
- Vincent Hidalgo – guitar
- William Harrigan – bass
- David Hidalgo Jr. – drums
- Alfredo Ortiz – drums

== Discography ==
=== Albums ===
Title	Released	Label
Punk Rock Pow-Wow	2000	Ejole Discos
Cinco de Mayo	2003	Split Seven Records

=== Other appearances ===
Title	Released	Album
“Atomic Garden/What Can You Do?/White Trash”	2001	Along the Way: A Tribute to Bad Religion
“Chalk Dust Torture”	2001	Sharin’ the Groove: Celebrating the Music of Phish

== TV Credits ==
- In 2003, on season 2 of the TV show The Shield on the 18th episode, titled GREENLIT, the Los Villains song 'No Estas Solo' was used during the scene when Detective Vic Mackey smashes the jukebox.
