= Rosa 'Electron' =

Bright pink rose cultivar

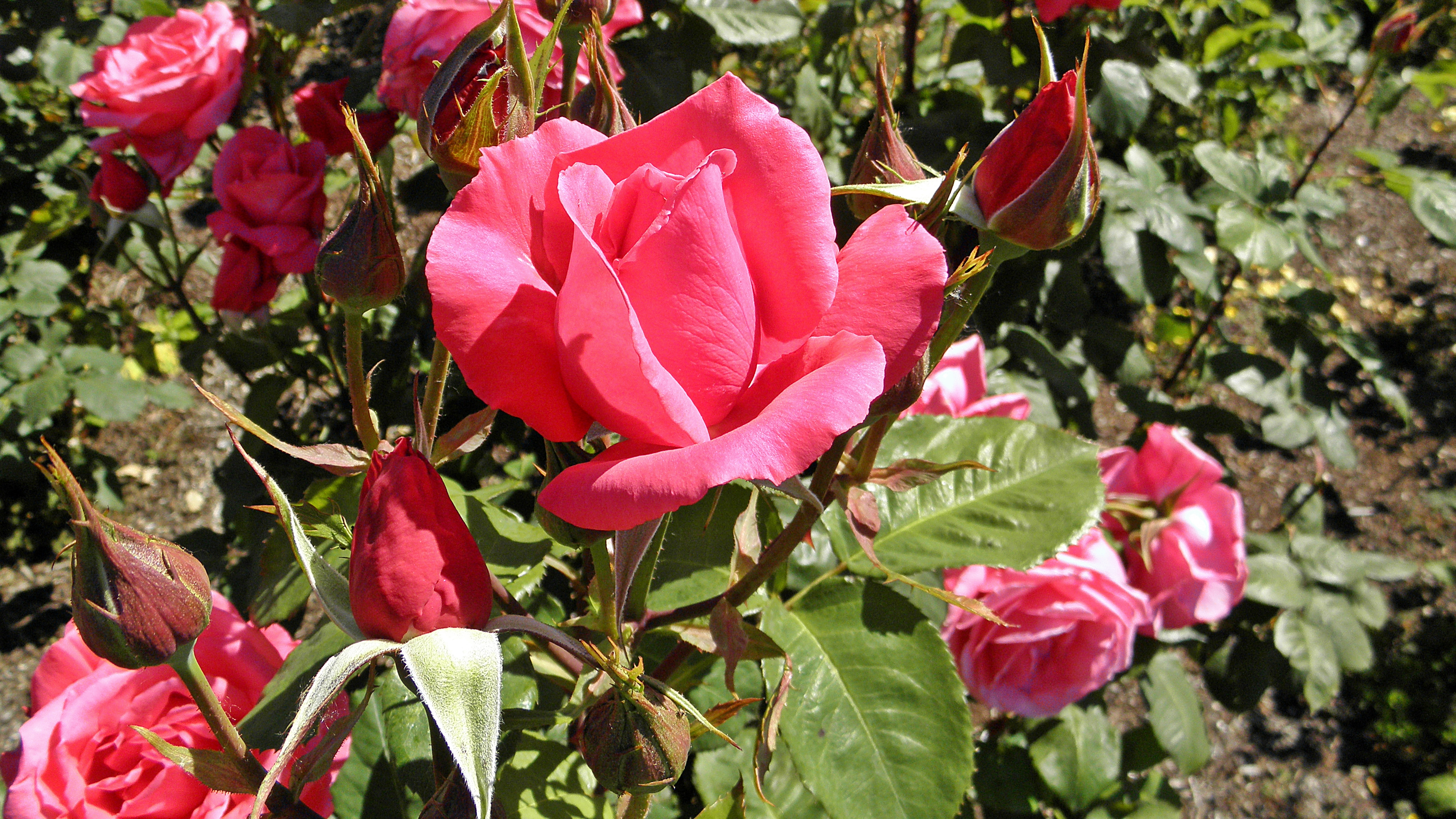
- Hybrid parentage: 'Paddy McGredy' x 'Prima Ballerina'
- Cultivar group: Hybrid tea rose
- Marketing names: 'Electron' 'Mullard Jubilee'
- Breeder: McGredy IV
- Origin: Northern Ireland, 1970

Rosa 'Electron', also known as Mullard Jubilee, is a bright pink hybrid tea rose developed by Samuel McGredy IV in 1962. Originally named 'Mullard Jubilee', it was introduced into Australia in 1970 as 'Electron'. The rose was named an All-America Rose Selections winner in 1973.

== Description ==
'Electron' is a medium-tall upright shrub, up to 2–4 ft (60–120 cm) in height. Its blooms are 4—5 in (10—12 cm) in diameter, with 32 to 40 petals. The rose has a sweet, Damask fragrance. The large, high-centered, cup-shaped petals are generally borne singly on long stems. The petals are bright pink in color. The plant has very prickly stems and dark green glossy leaves. 'Electron' thrives in cool climates, but is prone to fungal diseases in warmer areas. It is recommended for USDA zones 4 and warmer.

== History ==
=== McGredy roses ===
The Sam McGredy family represents four generations of rose hybridizers from Northern Ireland. The first Samuel McGredy (1828–1903), established the family nursery in Portadown, County Armagh. Originally the head gardener at a large estate, in 1888, McGredy moved his family to Portadown, leased 10 acres with a greenhouse and established a nursery with his son, Samuel II (1861–1926). The nursery sold a variety of plants, but they were best known for their fruit trees and show pansies.

Samuel McGredy II began breeding roses in 1895. He submitted his first roses at the National Rose Society in London in 1905, where he won his first gold medal, the salmon-pink, "Countess of Gosford" rose. He produced many award-winning roses during his career as a rose breeder. McGredy was awarded the National Rose Society's Dean Hole Medal in 1921. The business passed to his son, Samuel McGredy III (1897–1934), after Samuel II's death in 1926. Samuel III (Sam) expanded rose production at the company. He named many roses after family members. 'Margaret McGredy', named after his mother, was used, along with an unnamed seedling, to hybridize the world-famous hybrid tea, Rosa Peace. The nursery's rose-breeding program declined after McGredy's early death of a heart attack at the age of 38 and the beginning of the Second World War. His son, Samuel IV, was two years old at the time of his father's death.

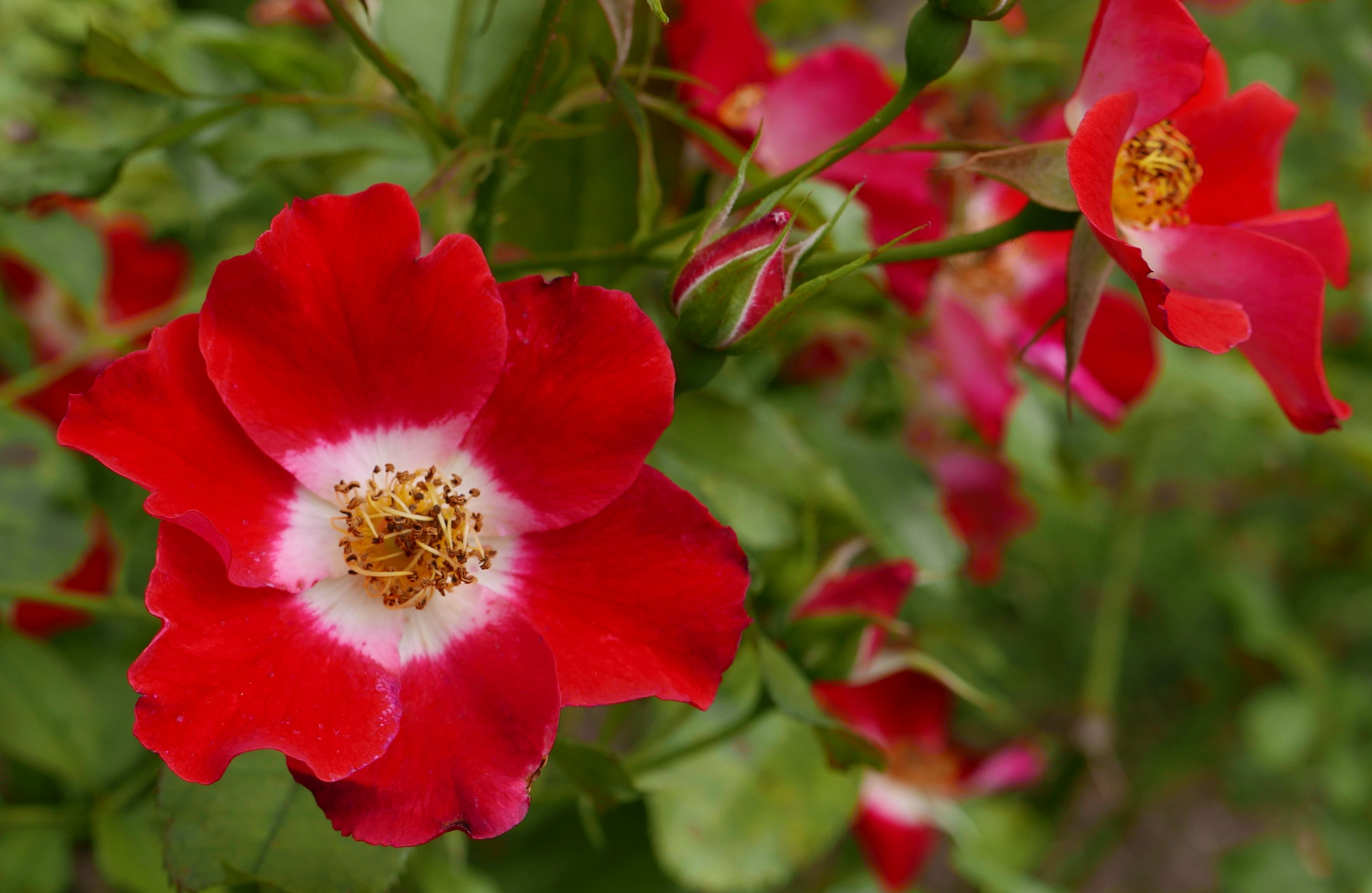
Rosa 'Eye Paint', 1976

When Samuel McGredy IV (Sam) (1931–2019) took over the family business in 1952, he knew very little about rose breeding. He sought out the renowned rose hybridizers at the time: Reimer Kordes from Germany, Eugene Boerner from the United States and Niels Poulsen from Denmark, in order to educate himself on modern rose hybridization. Soon after, he created a new rose breeding program at the nursery. McGredy's first commercial success was his Gold Medal winner, floribunda rose, 'Orangeade' in 1959. During the 1960s, McGredy was best known for his hybrid tea and floribunda roses.

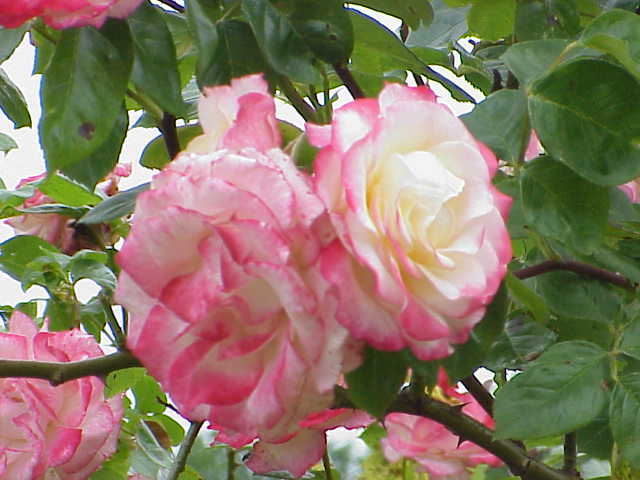
Rosa 'Handel', 1975

In 1972, alarmed over the increasing political violence in Northern Ireland, McGredy and his family moved to Auckland, New Zealand. He transplanted his nursery stock, and renamed the company McGredy Roses International. New Zealand's climate, ideal for plant cultivation, allowed McGredy to breed roses outdoors without greenhouses. He soon introduced a new series of what he called 'hand painted' roses, brightly coloured striped roses and roses splashed with two or more colours. Some of his most popular rose cultivars include Rosa 'Dublin Bay', Rosa 'Sexy Rexy', Rosa 'Olympiad' and Rosa 'Handel'. When McGredy retired in 2007, he closed the nursery. He died in 2019.

=== 'Mullard Jubilee' ===
McGredy's early goals in rose breeding were the development of healthy, vigorous roses that would meet the growing demand for distinctive roses, both in the United Kingdom and the United States. By the 1960s he was becoming more innovative, creating new vibrantly coloured hybrid tea and floribunda roses. In 1962, McGredy used the hybrid tea, Rosa 'Paddy McGredy' and floribunda rose, Rosa 'Prima Ballerina', to develop a new electric pink hybrid tea rose. That year, the Mullard Electronics Company in the UK offered McGredy the unprecedented fee of £10,000 ($24,000) for a new rose cultivar to be named for the company. The company requested a future award-winner, a "world-beater", according to McGredy. The new electric pink rose was chosen to bear the Mullard name and was introduced in Europe as 'Mullard Jubilee' in 1970. The new cultivar was also introduced into Australia in 1970 as 'Electron'.

In his 1982 book Look to the Rose, McGredy discusses his famous rose:

I know a lot of people who think it is the best rose I've raised. I don't - simply because it is pink! If I had the same plant and floriferousness and fragrance in a red I would be ecstatic. I'm also annoyed with the variety because it refuses to breed me anything which looks even remotely as good. In fact, like so many of my strains, 'Mullard Jubilee' is the end of the line, the last of my 'Paddy McGredy' seedlings. Paddy is of somewhat similar colouring. The other side of 'Mullard Jubilee' was Tantau's 'Prima Ballerina', a deep very fragrant pink. ... Both 'Paddy McGredy' and 'Prima Ballerina' give a high percentage of seedlings with mildew, so it is a wonder 'Mullard Jubilee' is so healthy. But there it is, a beautiful grower if ever there was one.

— Sam McGredy, Look to the Rose (1982)

The rose won several awards, including gold medals from the Royal National Rose Society (RNRS) (1969), The Hague Rose Trials (1970), Belfast International Rose Trials (1972) and Portland Rose Society (1973). The cultivar was named an All-America Rose Selections winner in 1973.

== See also ==
- Garden roses
- Rose Hall of Fame
- List of Award of Garden Merit roses
- ADR rose
