= Rosa 'Violet Carson' =

Rose cultivar

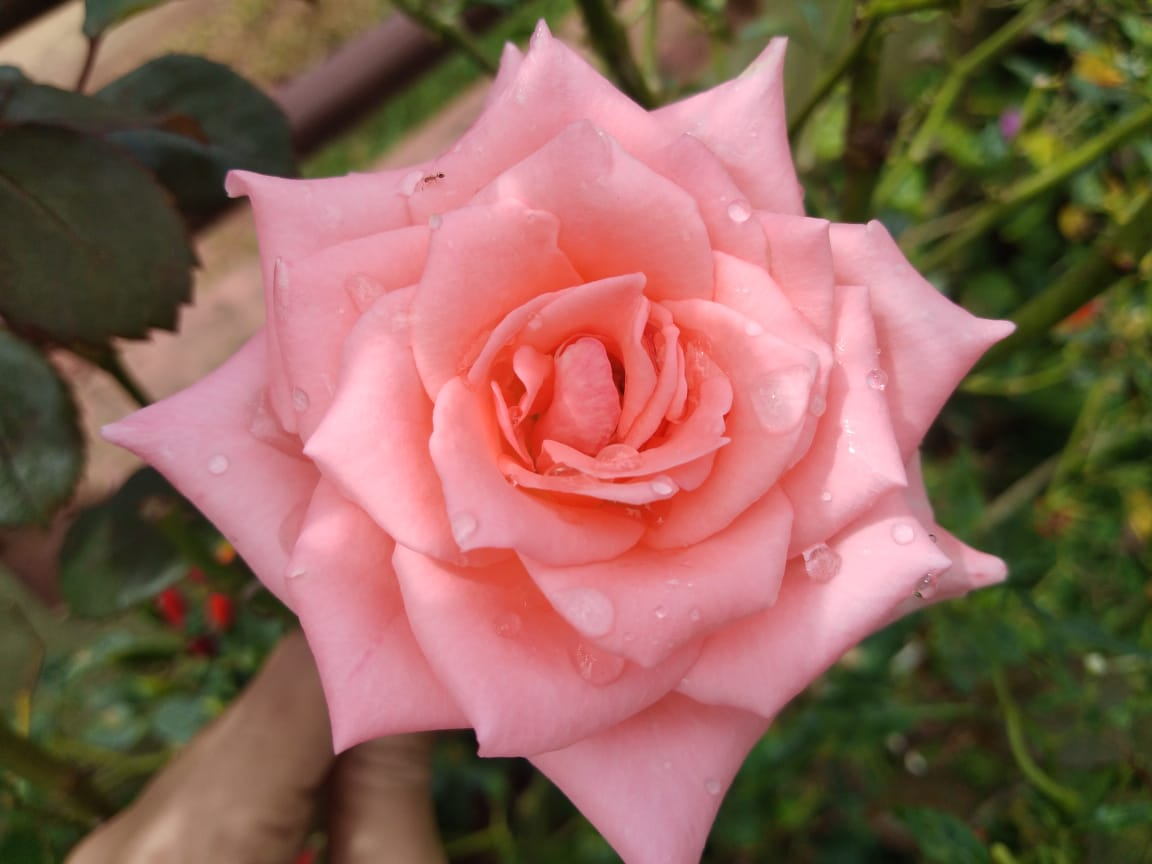
- Genus: Rosa hybrid
- Hybrid parentage: 'Mme Leon Cuny' × 'Spartan'
- Cultivar group: Floribunda
- Cultivar: 'Violet Carson'
- Marketing names: MACio
- Breeder: Samuel Darragh McGredy IV
- Origin: Northern Ireland, 1964.

Rosa 'Violet Carson' is a salmon-pink rose cultivar, an uncommon hybrid of the red hybrid tea 'Mme Léon Cuny' (Gaujard, 1955) and the orange floribunda 'Spartan' (Boerner, 1955), created by Samuel McGredy IV between 1963 and 1964. It was named after the English actress Violet Carson (1898–1983), who played Ena Sharples in the British soap opera Coronation Street.

The dense semi-double flowers reach an average diameter of 8 centimetres (3.1 in), with up to 35 petals, and appear in loose clusters of 3 to 15 in flushes throughout the season. They have a mild to strong, sweet musk fragrance and an elegant bloom form, with outer petals that bend decoratively outwards. Their colour ranges from a blush to strong pink with a cream centre and a reverse described as lemony or silvery in young flowers that changes to pink and white in mature petals.

The compact bushy shrub grows 0.75 to 1.5 metres (2.5 to 5 feet) high and about 1 metre (3.3 ft) wide. The young shoots are crimson with reddish purple new foliage that turns to a glossy slightly blue dark green. 'Violet Carson' is (almost) thornless, rain tolerant and winter hardy down to −23 °C (USDA zone 6).

The flower has been notably featured in the graphic novel V for Vendetta, but in the movie version is renamed to the fictitious "Scarlet Carson", which Ruth grows for her partner (Valerie), and V grows during his imprisonment in the Larkhill Resettlement Camp. They were portrayed in the film by red 'Grand Prix' roses.
