= Rosa 'Spek's Centennial' =

Rose cultivar

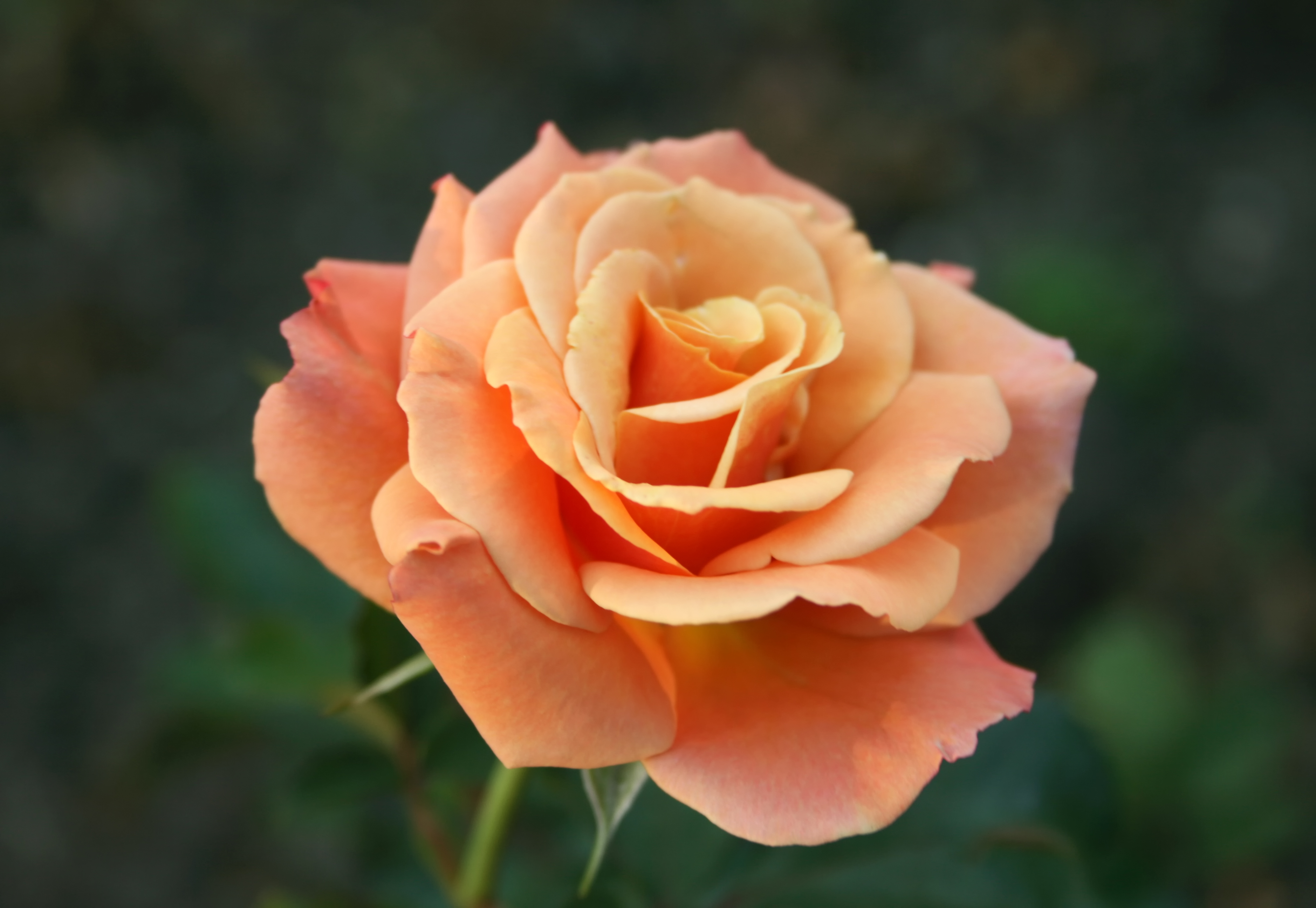
- Rosa 'Spek's Centennial'
- Genus: Rosa hybrid
- Hybrid parentage: 'Sexy Rexy' x 'Pot o' Gold'
- Cultivar group: Floribunda
- Cultivar: MACivy
- Marketing names: 'Spek's Centennial, 'Singin' in the Rain', 'Love's Spring'
- Breeder: McGredy
- Origin: New Zealand, 1991

Rosa 'Spek's Centennial', (a.k.a. MACivy), is a floribunda rose cultivar, bred by Sam McGredy IV. It was introduced into New Zealand by Egmont Roses in 1991. The rose cultivar was later introduced into the United States by Edmunds' Roses in 1994 as 'Singin' in the Rain'. The rose was named an All-America Rose Selections winner in 1995.

== Description ==
'Spek's Centennial' is a medium compact, almost thornless shrub, 3 to 4 ft (91–121 cm) in height with a 2 to 3 ft (60–90 cm) spread. Blooms are 2—3 in (5—7.5 cm) in diameter, with a petal count of 26 to 40. Bloom form is high-centered and ruffled. Flowers are an apricot-blend color, displaying various shades of pink, apricot and orange with unusual copper colored petal backs. Flowers often have dark pink petal edges and cream centers. Blooms have a strong, musky fragrance, and are generally borne in clusters up to five. The plant blooms in flushes from spring to autumn. The shrub has medium-sized, glossy, bronze-green, dense, leathery foliage. The plant is disease resistant, and thrives in USDA zone 6b and warmer.

== Child plants ==
'Spek's Centennial' was used to hybridize the following rose varieties:

- Rosa 'Adobe Sunrise', (before 2011)
- Rosa 'Centennial Rose', (1996)
- Rosa 'Hello Gorgeous', (before 2011)
- Rosa 'Honey Dijon', (2003)
- Rosa 'Mardi Gras', (2007)
- Rosa 'Top Notch', (1996)
- Rosa 'Yellow Submarine', (2015)

== Awards ==
- Royal National Rose Society (RNRS) Gold Medal, (1991)
- All-America Rose Selections (AARS) winner, USA, (1995)

== See also ==
- Garden roses
- Rose Hall of Fame
- List of Award of Garden Merit roses
