= Rosa 'Arthur Bell' =

Rose cultivar

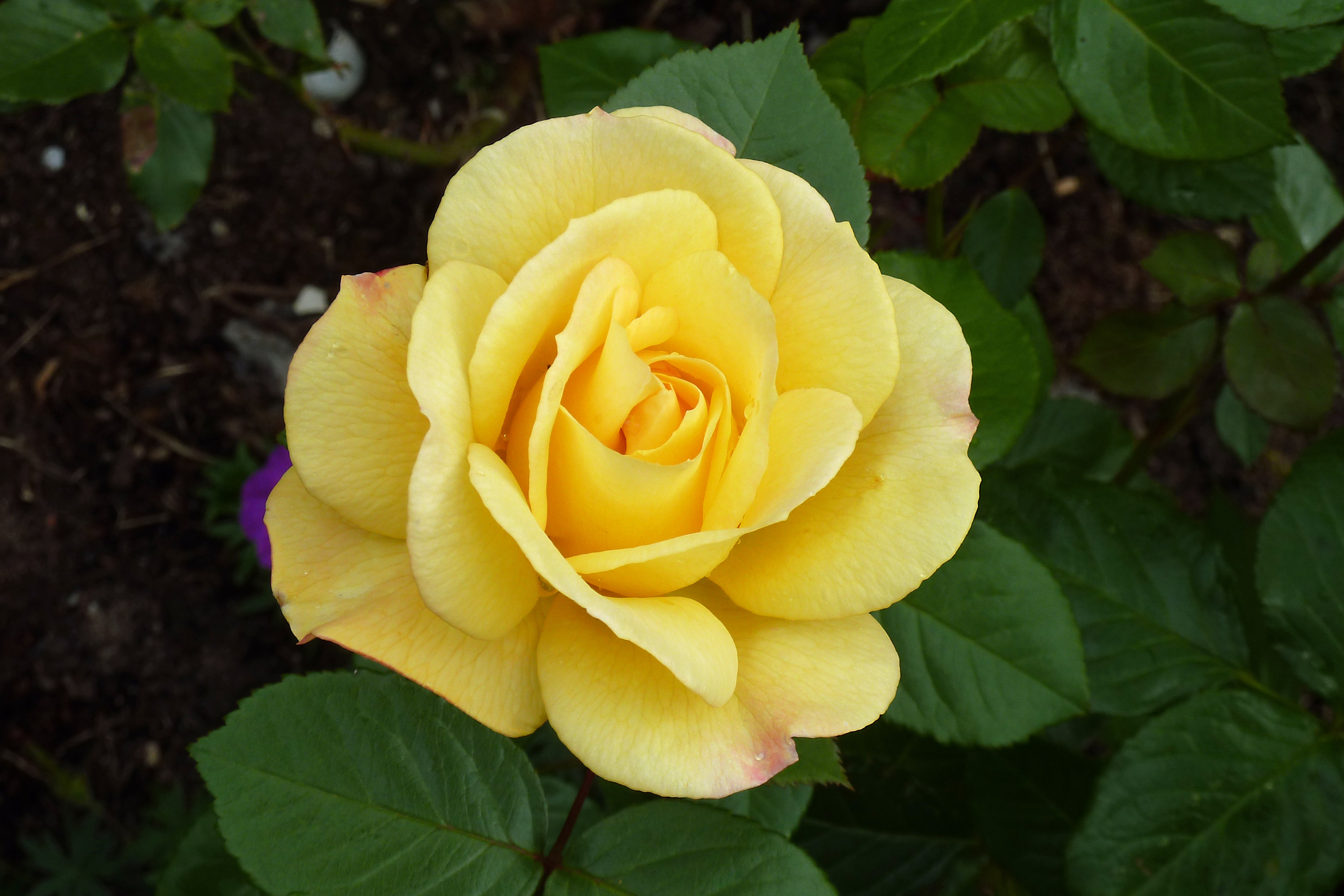
- Close-up of flower
- Hybrid parentage: Rosa hybrid 'Cläre Grammerstorf' × 'Piccadilly'
- Cultivar group: Floribunda
- Cultivar: 'T11 AgCan'
- Marketing names: 'Arthur Bell'
- Origin: Samuel Darragh McGredy IV, 1964

Rosa 'Arthur Bell', (syn. T11 AgCan), is a yellow rose cultivar, bred by Sam McGredy IV in Northern Ireland in 1964. The rose has won numerous awards, and is popular in England and Northern Europe.

== History ==
'Arthur Bell' was bred by Sam McGredy in Northern Ireland in 1964. The new cultivar was named for the Scottish whisky manufacturer, Arthur Kinmond Bell (1868—1942). Many of Sam McGredy IV's rose varieties are named after alcoholic drinks. The rose is a cross between 'Cläre Grammerstorf' and 'Piccadilly', and is classed as a modern floribunda rose.

'Arthur Bell' was used to hybridize the cultivars: Rosa 'Amanda' (1979), 'Rosa Bonanza' (1983), 'Decor Arlequin' (1986), 'Eyecatcher' (1976), 'Glenfiddich' (1976), 'Goldmarie' (1982), 'Louis de Funes' (1987), 'Loving Lorna' (2013), 'Mountbatten' (1982), 'Typhoo Tea' (1974) and 'Verian' (2013).

== Description ==
'Arthur Bell' forms compact deciduous shrub of upright bushy growth, up to 1 m (3 ft) height with repeat-flowering properties. In summer it bears clusters of very fragrant, bright yellow flowers fading to pale yellow. The flowers are slightly double, with red stamens when they open out. Blooms arrive in medium-sized clusters on thick, prickly stems. Flowers do not disintegrate in rain. Blooms reach an average diameter of 3 inches (7.6 cm) and have up to 25 petals.

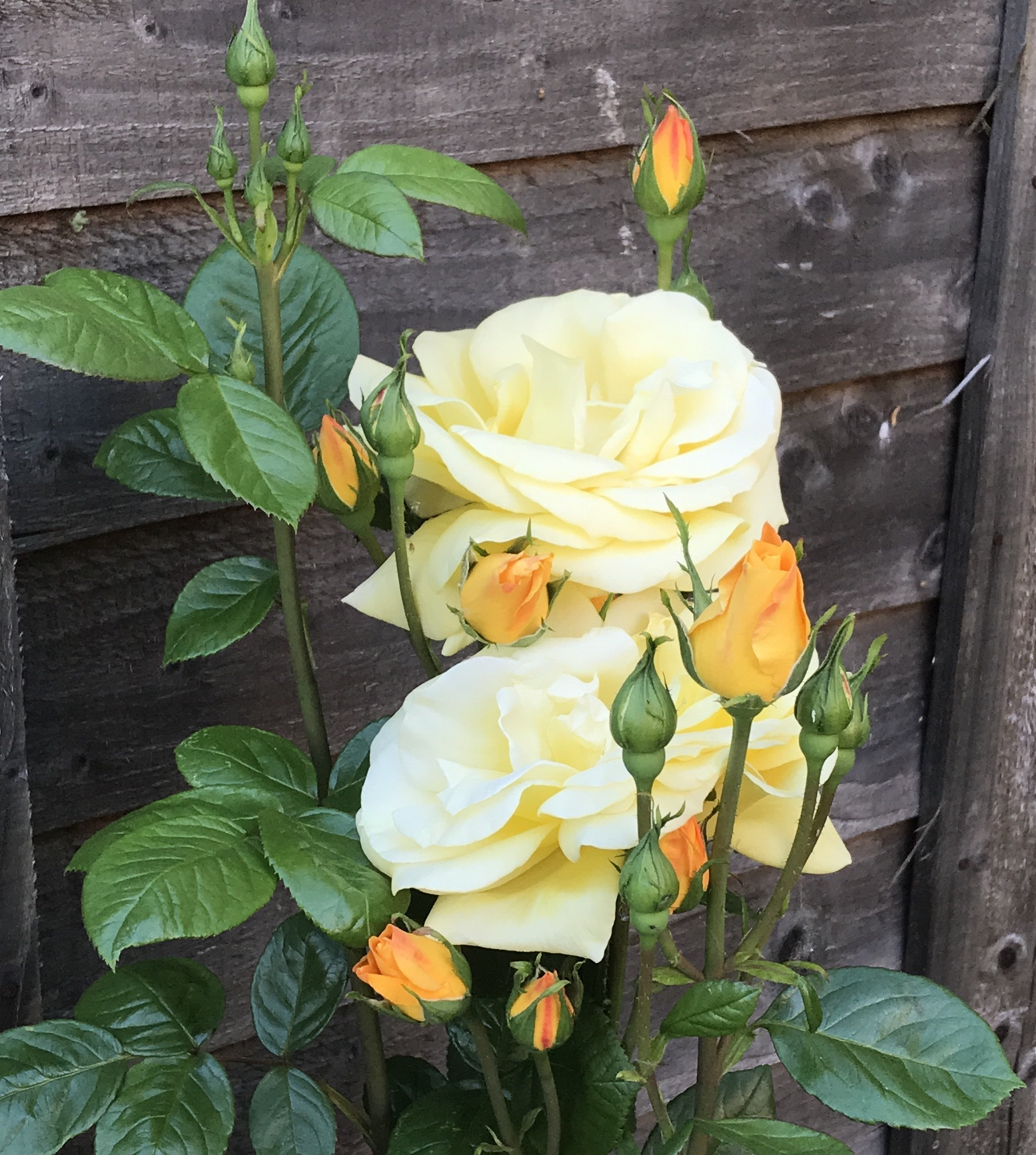
A cluster of rose blooms of the cultivar ‘Arthur Bell‘.

== Awards ==
This rose has gained numerous awards, including the Royal National Rose Society's Certificate of Merit (1964), and the Royal Horticultural Society's Award of Garden Merit (1993).

There is also a climbing variety, which was discovered by Pearce in 1978 and introduced as 'Arthur Bell, Cl.'. In 2001, the variety was granted the Royal Horticultural Society's Award of Garden Merit.
