= Sam McGredy =

Northern Irish rose hybridizers

Sam McGredy refers to four generations of Northern Irish rose hybridizers. Sam McGredy I founded the family nursery in 1880. Sam McGredy II focused the nursery on roses in 1895. Sam McGredy III took over in 1926, and was the first to name roses after family members. Sam McGredy IV moved operations to New Zealand in 1974 after a close friend was murdered by Loyalist paramilitaries during The Troubles, and focused on Floribundas, Hybrid Teas and Grandifloras, including 'Paddy Stephens', 'New Zealand', and 'Kathryn McGredy'; and the hand-painted roses such as 'Regensberg'.

== Samuel McGredy I ==
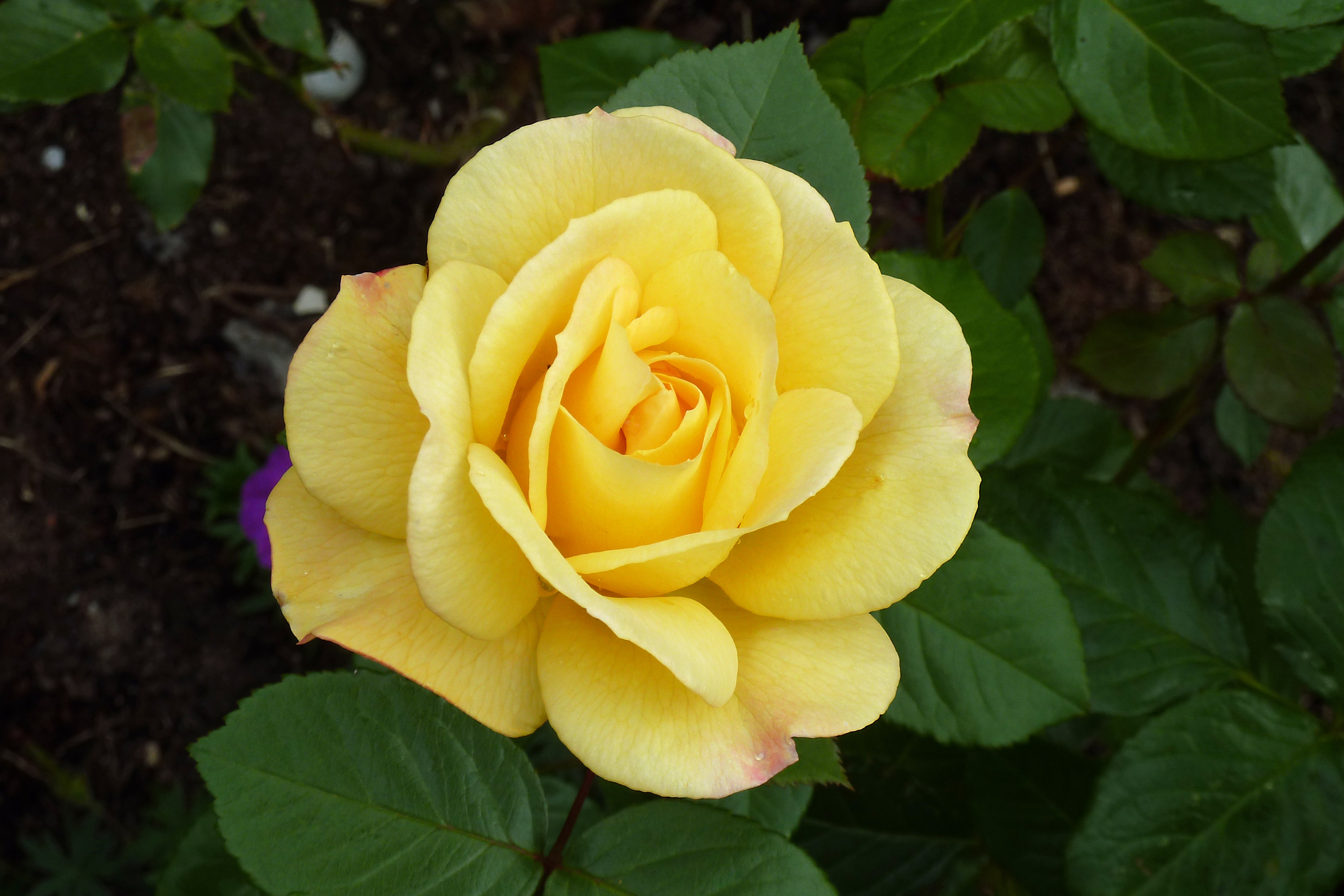
'Arthur Bell' 1964

Sam McGredy I (1828–1903) founded the family nursery, Samuel McGredy & Son, Nurserymen, in 1880, in Portadown, County Armagh, Northern Ireland. He left a position as head gardener on an estate at the age of 50 to build the nursery business with his son, Sam McGredy II, who was a teenager at the time. The nursery initially specialized in fruit trees and show pansies, and benefited from excellent soil and easy rail transport to both Dublin and Belfast.

== Samuel McGredy II ==
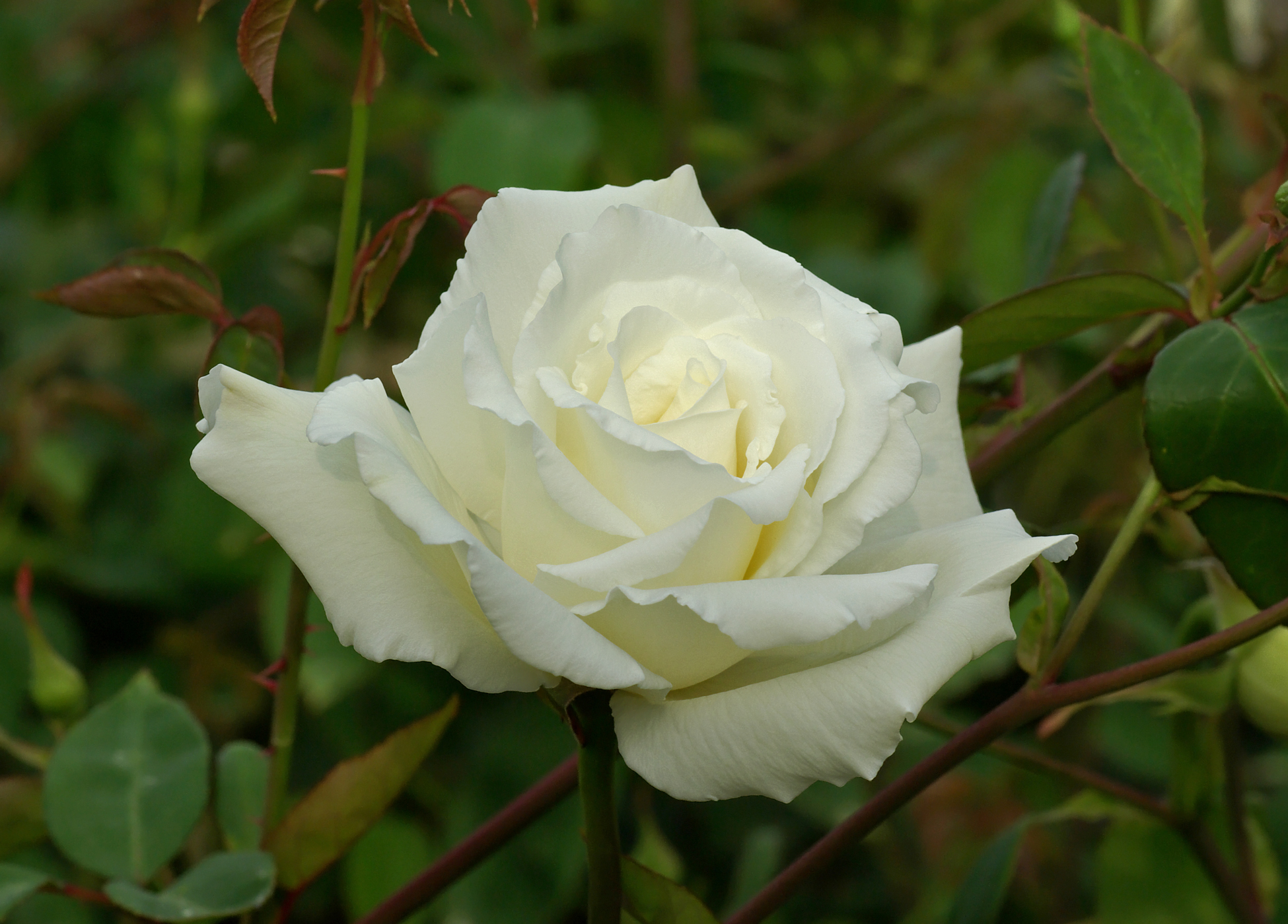
'Mrs Herbert Stevens' 1910

Samuel McGredy II (1861–1926) turned the family nursery towards roses, which promised to be more profitable than pansies, and began hybridizing his own roses. He showed his roses in the National Rose Society show in London for the first time in 1905, and won the Gold Medal for 'Countess of Gosford'. Similarly to the British rose hybridizer Henry Bennett, McGredy II grew his parent plants in pots in heated greenhouses to give a longer season for seed ripening. He produced many Gold Medal winners and was dubbed 'The Irish Wizard' by other rosarians.

== Samuel McGredy III ==
Samuel Davison McGredy III (1897–1934) took over the family nursery and rose hybridizing business on his father's death, and greatly expanded production of roses. He was the first in the family to name roses after family members, with 'Margaret McGredy', named after his mother. 'Margaret McGredy' was later used as one of the ancestors of the famous hybrid tea, 'Peace'. 'Mrs. Sam McGredy', named for his wife, was introduced in 1929, and was very popular. Along with roses, McGredy III also bred Fox Terriers, parakeets, and budgerigars.

McGredy III died suddenly of a heart attack in November 1934, at the age of 38.

== Samuel McGredy IV ==
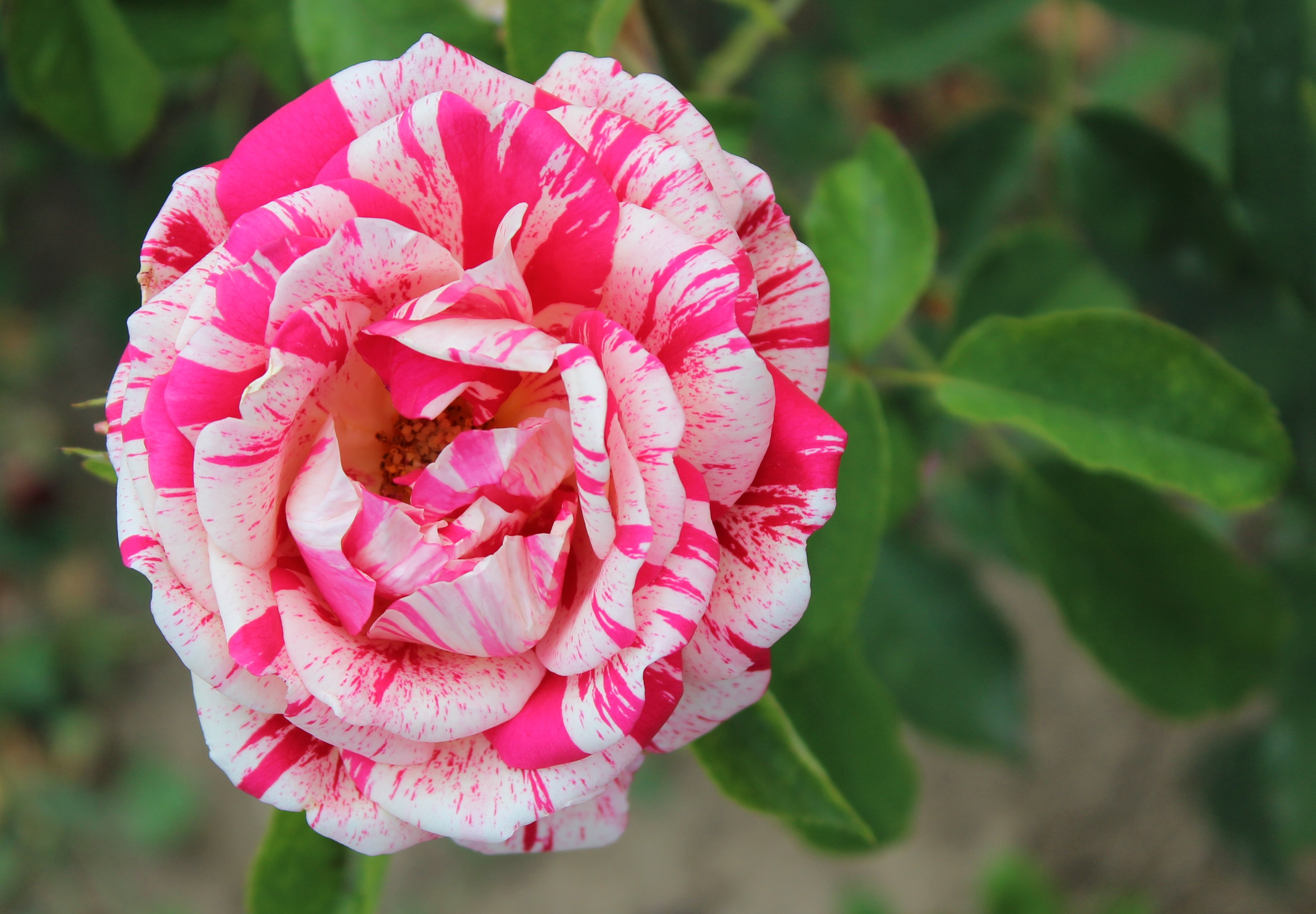
'Papageno' 1989

Samuel Darragh McGredy (1932 – 25 August 2019) was only 2 years old when his father McGredy III died. A board of trustees including his uncle Walter and mother Ruth took over management of the rose breeding and nursery until McGredy IV was of age. Meanwhile, as was the usual practice at the time, young McGredy IV was sent away to boarding school at the age of 7. He attended Mercersburg Academy in Pennsylvania USA in 1948, then Greenmount Agricultural College in 1949. From there he moved on to Reading University. After leaving Reading he worked at a rhododendron nursery to further expertise in hybridisation, then reported for duty at the family nursery in Portadown in 1952, at which time he was handed the keys and began the modern phase of the rose-breeding industry.

McGredy IV modernised operations and transformed style. He was famously adept at dictating innovation and fashion, along with plant health and strength. He introduced his first hybrid of his own, 'Salute', a cherry-red and yellow bicolor floribunda, in 1958. His first Gold Medal winner, 'Orangeade', a floribunda, was introduced the next year, in 1959. Sam McGredy IV married fashion model Maureen McCall in 1960. They had three daughters, Kathryn McGredy (1961), Maria Winder (1964), and Clodagh Leigh (1974).

In 1972 McGredy IV and family emigrated to Auckland, New Zealand. The move allowed him to breed roses without the need for greenhouses, and to better select roses that would do well in the USA, his major market.

Sam and Maureen divorced in 1978, and Sam later married Jillian Hawcridge. In the 1994 Queen's Birthday Honours, Sam McGredy IV was appointed a Commander of the Order of the British Empire, for services to horticulture. When he retired, he closed the nursery. He died on 25 August 2019.

=== Roses of Sam McGredy IV ===
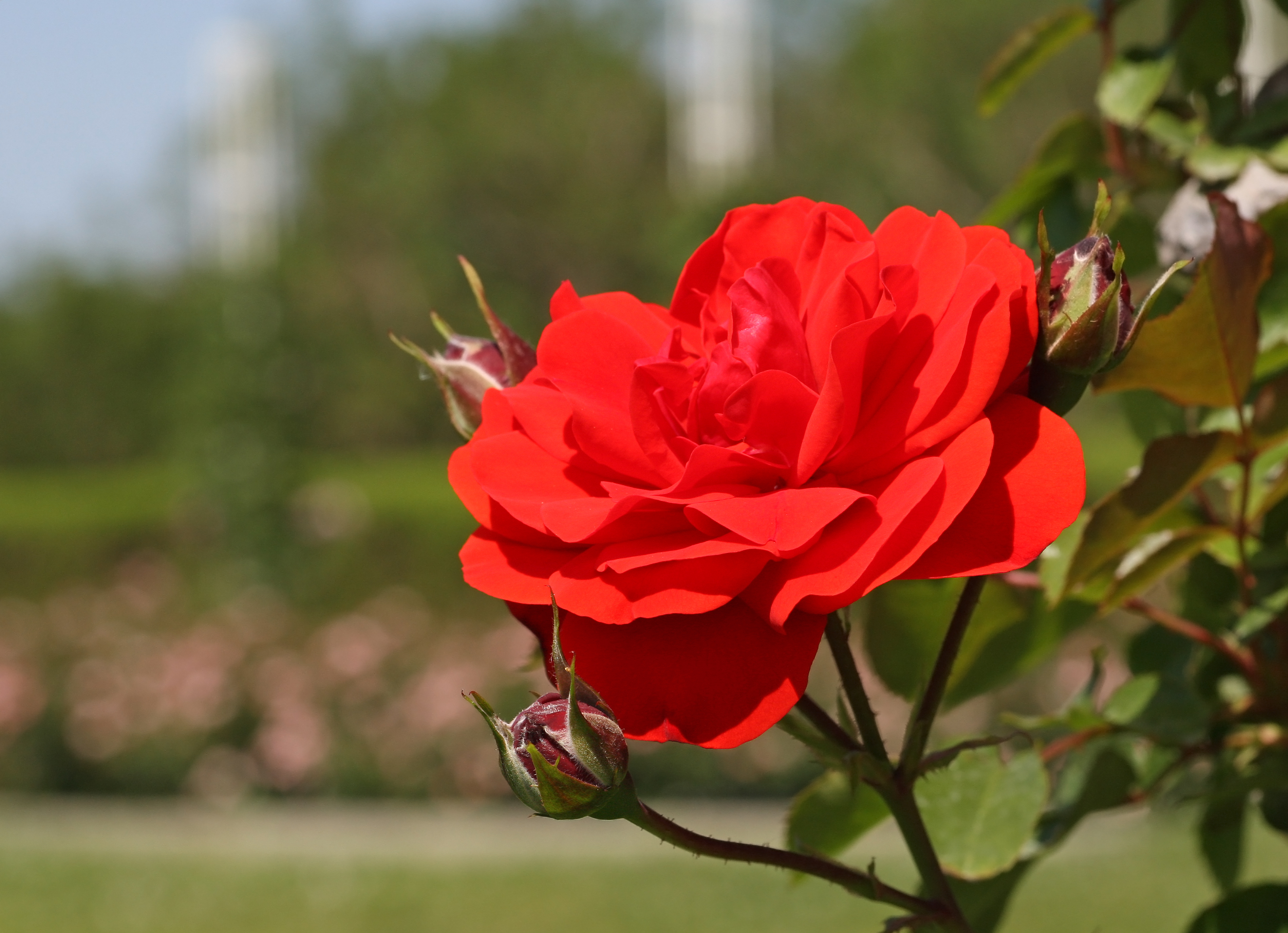
'Trumpeter' 1977

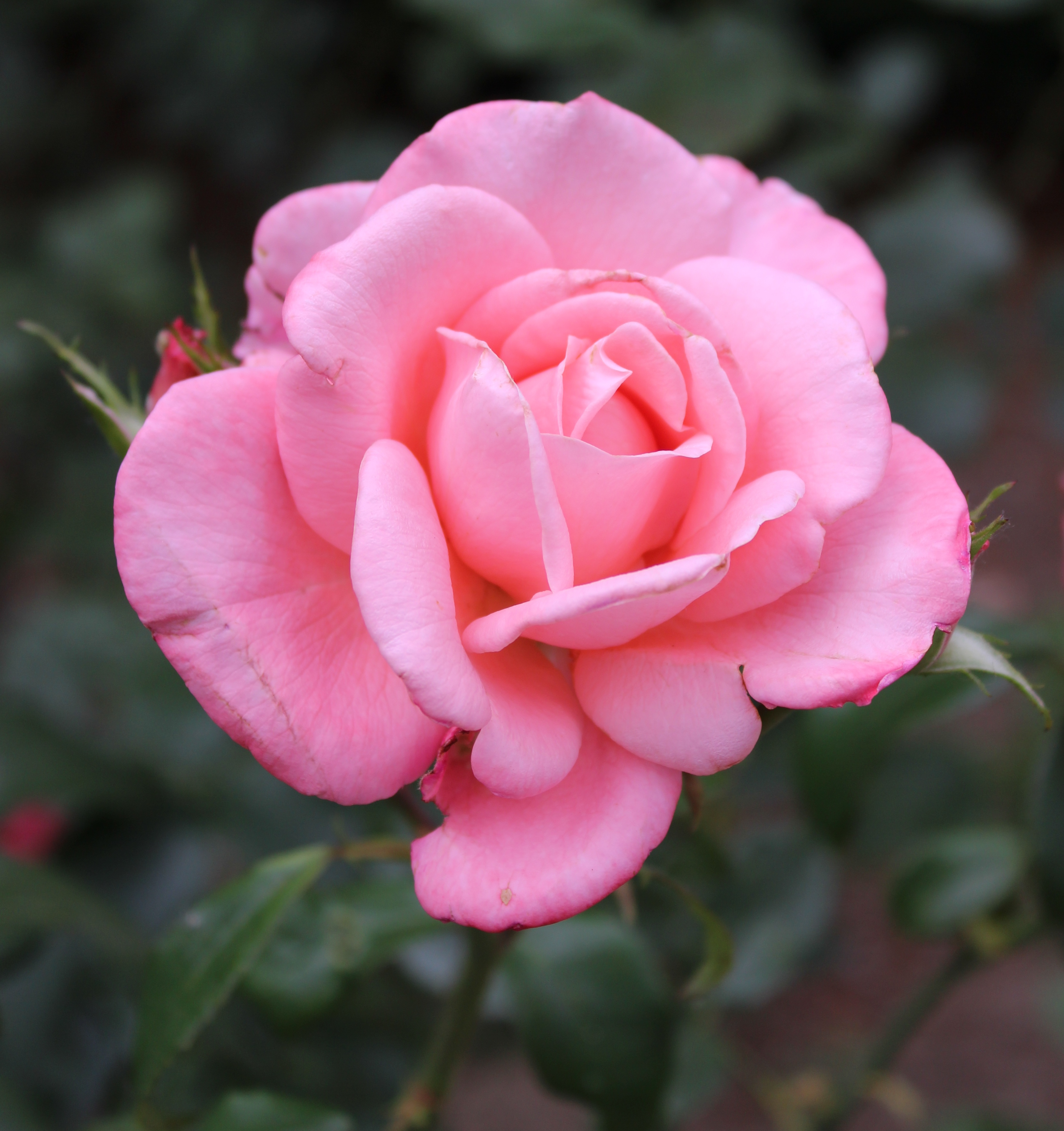
'New Zealand' 1989

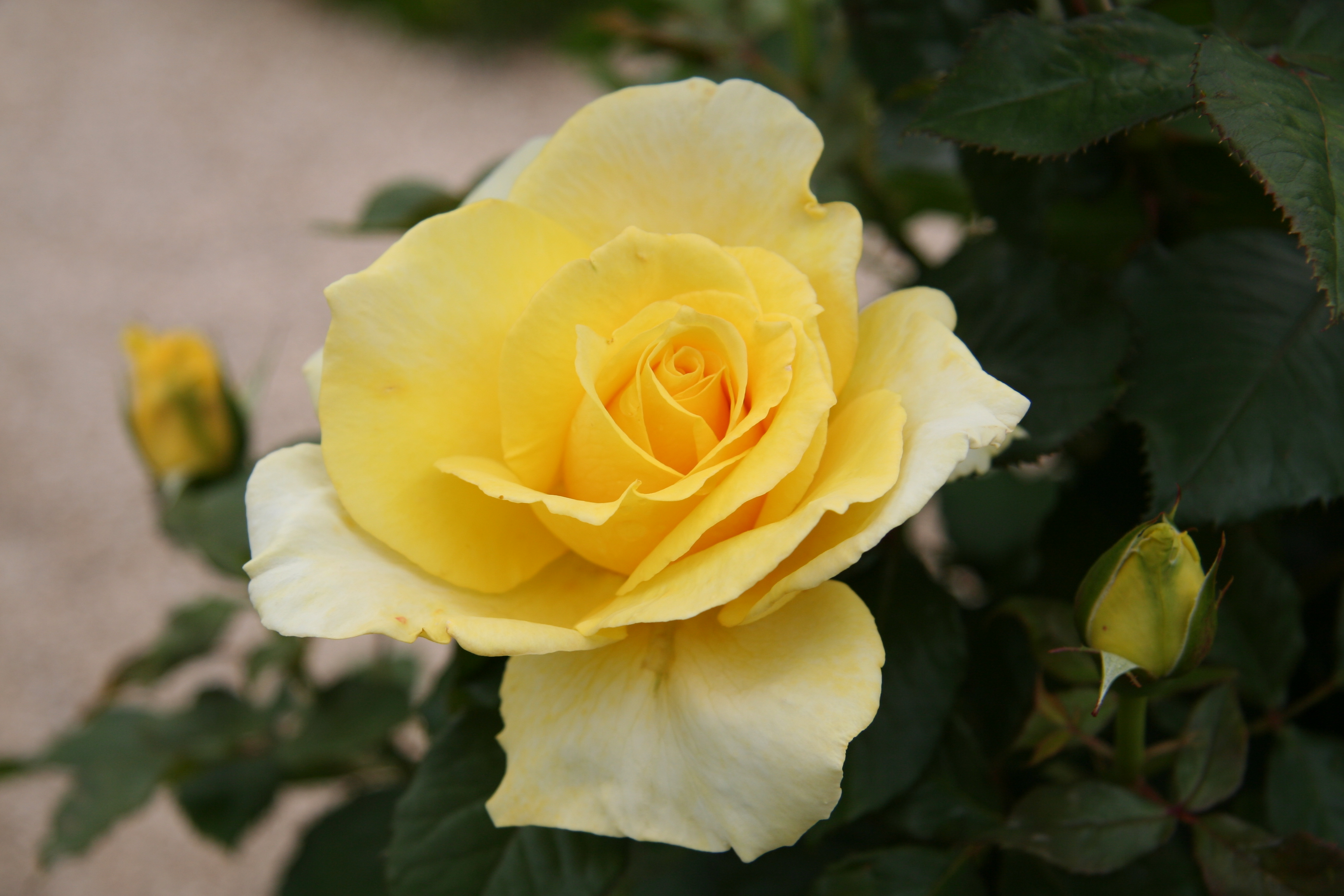
'Aperitif' 1998

In 1962 he introduced a rose named after the younger of his two sisters, 'Paddy McGredy', a rose-red rose that bloomed in bunches on long stems. In that same time period, Queen Elizabeth the Queen Mother, Royal Patron of the Royal National Rose Society, gave McGredy IV permission to name a rose after her with the name 'Elizabeth of Glamis' – a great honor. This rose was introduced in 1963, a light salmon floribunda. McGredy IV's hand-painted rose series started in 1971, with the introduction of 'Picasso', a patterned red and white rose.

=== Plant Breeders' Rights ===
Sam McGredy IV campaigned for passage of a Plant Breeders' Rights act in the UK, starting in 1955. At the time, anyone could propagate a new rose and sell it with no payment to the hybridizer. Rose hybridizers only made money on their creations for the year or two that they had a head start on their competitors. Most rose hybridizers owned a nursery for the propagation and sale of plants, which supported their hybridizing. The Plant Breeders' Rights Act was passed in 1964. Sam McGredy IV secured rights to his climbing rose 'Handel'.

Another first, and again at Sam’s instigation, the New Zealand Plant Varieties Act was passed in parliament in 1973. The first New Zealand Plant Varieties Right was granted to Sam McGredy Roses International for 'Matangi', a floribunda, in 1976.

=== Selected roses ===
- 'Picadilly' Hybrid Tea, 1959
- 'Handel', Floribunda, 1960
- 'Arthur Bell', 1964
- 'Irish Beauty' Floribunda, 1964
- 'Violet Carson', 1964
- 'Electron' Hybrid Tea, 1970
- 'Santa Catalina' Floribunda, 1970
- 'Liverpool Echo' Floribunda, 1971
- 'Old Master' Floribunda, 1974
- 'Typhoo Tea' Hybrid Tea, 1974
- 'Dublin Bay' Climber, 1975
- 'Captain Cook' Floribunda, 1977
- 'Trumpeter' Floribunda, 1977
- 'Regensberg' Floribunda, 1979
- Olympiad Hybrid Tea, 1982
- 'Today' Hybrid Tea, 1982
- 'Sexy Rexy' Floribunda, 1984
- 'Waiheke' Grandiflora, 1986
- 'Aotearoa' Hybrid Tea, 1989
- 'Spiced Coffee' Hybrid Tea, 1990
- 'Maggie Barry' Hybrid Tea, 1993
- 'Oranges 'n' Lemons' Floribunda, 1994
- 'Spek's Centennial'' Floribunda, 1994
- 'Octoberfest' Grandiflora, ~1998
- 'Cologne' Grandiflora, 1998
- 'Reba McEntire' Grandiflora, 1998

== Sources ==
- Harkness, Jack (1985). The Maker of Heavenly Roses. ISBS. ISBN 978-0285626546.
- Quest-Ritson, Brigid; Quest-Ritson, Charles (1993). Encyclopedia of Roses. DK Publishing. ISBN 978-0756688684.
