= Rosa 'Olympiad' =

Red hybrid tea rose cultivar

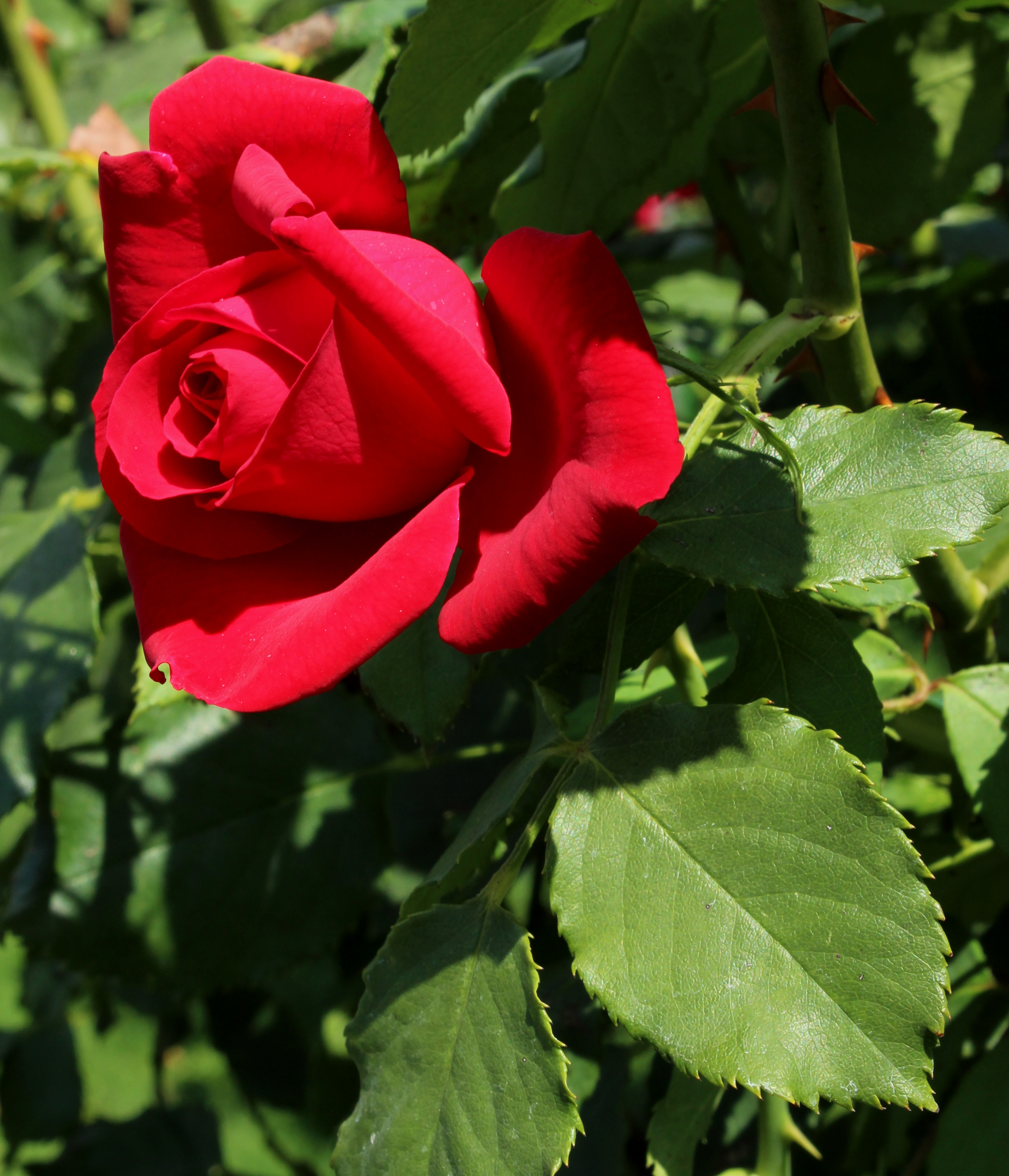
- Rosa 'Olympiad'
- Genus: Rosa hybrid
- Hybrid parentage: 'Red Planet' x 'Pharaon'
- Cultivar group: Hybrid tea
- Cultivar: MACauck
- Breeder: McGredy IV
- Origin: New Zealand, 1972

Rosa 'Olympiad', (a.k.a. MACauck ), is a hybrid tea rose cultivar, developed by Sam McGredy IV, and introduced into New Zealand by McGredy Roses International in 1974. The cultivar was named an All-America Rose Selections winner in 1984, and the recipient of the Portland Gold Medal in 1995.

== Description ==
'Olympiad' is a medium-tall, upright shrub, 3 to 5 ft (60–121 cm) in height with a 2 to 3 ft (60–91 cm) spread. Blooms are medium-large, with an average diameter of 4—5 in (10–12 cm), with 32 to 37 petals. Flowers are a dark red and have a mild tea fragrance. Blooms have a full high-centered bloom form, and are borne mostly solitary on long, upright stems. Foliage is large, matte, and medium green in color. 'Olympiad' blooms in flushes throughout its growing season. The plant does best in USDA zone 5b and warmer. The rose does well in heat, unlike most dark red roses, is resistant to mildew, but prone to blackspot.

== McGredy roses ==
The Sam McGredy family represents four generations of rose hybridizers from Northern Ireland. The first Samuel McGredy (1828 –1903), established the family nursery in Portadown, County Armagh. Originally, the head gardener at a large estate, in 1888, McGredy moved his family to Portadown, leased 10 acres with a greenhouse and established a nursery with his son, Samuel II (1861–1926). The nursery sold a variety of plants, but they were best known for their fruit trees and show pansies.

Samuel McGredy II began breeding roses in 1895. He submitted his first roses at the National Rose Society in London in 1905, where he won his first gold medal, the salmon-pink, "Countess of Gosford" rose. He produced many award-winning roses during his career as a rose breeder. McGredy was awarded the National Rose Society's Dean Hole Medal in 1921. The business passed to his son, Samuel McGredy III (1897–1934), after Samuel II's death in 1926. Samuel III (Sam) expanded rose production at the company. He named many roses after family members. 'Margaret McGredy', named after his mother, was used, along with an unnamed seedling, to hybridize the world famous hybrid tea, Rosa Peace. The nursery's rose breeding program declined after McGredy's early death of a heart attack at the age of 38 and the beginning of World War II. His son, Samuel IV was two years old at the time of his father's death.

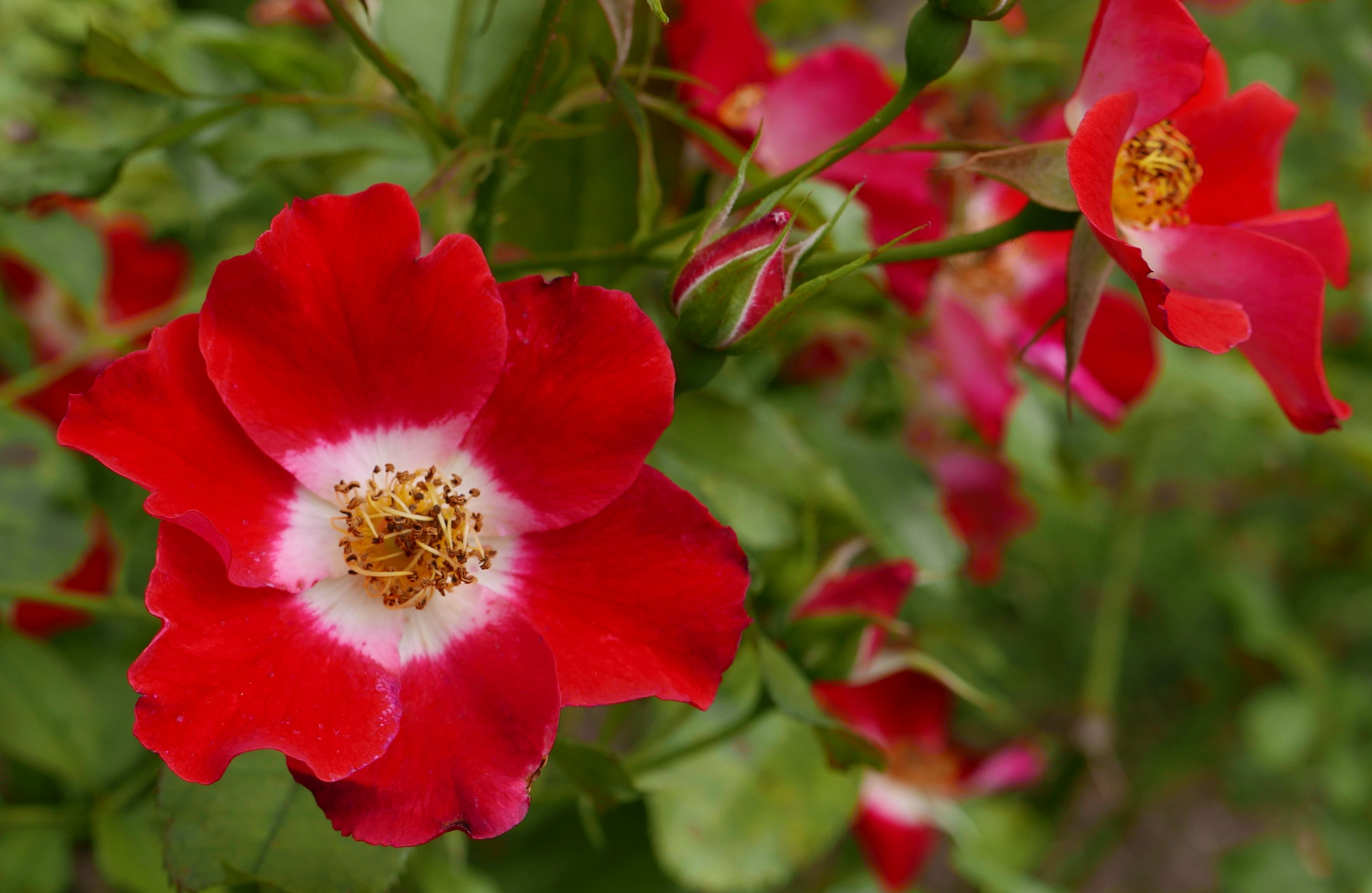
Rosa 'Eye Paint', 1976

When Samuel McGredy IV (Sam) (1931–2019) took over the family business in 1952, he knew very little about rose breeding. He sought out the renowned rose hybridizers at the time: Reimer Kordes from Germany, Eugene Boerner from the United States and Niels Poulsen from Denmark, in order to educate himself on modern rose hybridization. Soon after, he created a new rose breeding program at the nursery. McGredy's first commercial success was his Gold Medal winner, floribunda rose, 'Orangeade' in 1959. During the 1960s, McGredy was best known for his hybrid tea and floribunda roses.

In 1972, alarmed over the increasing political violence in Northern Ireland, McGredy and his family moved to Auckland, New Zealand. He transplanted his nursery stock and renamed the company, McGredy Roses International. New Zealand's climate, ideal for plant cultivation, allowed McGredy to breed roses outdoors without greenhouses. He soon introduced a new series of what he called 'hand painted' roses, brightly coloured striped roses and roses splashed with two or more colours. Some of his most popular rose cultivars include Rosa 'Dublin Bay, Rosa 'Sexy Rexy', and Rosa 'Handel'. When McGredy retired in 2007, he closed the nursery. He died in 2019.

== Child plants ==
'Olympiad' was used to hybridize the following plants:

- Rosa 'Cesar E. Chavez', (before 2002)
- Rosa 'City of San Francisco', (2000)
- Rosa 'Legends', (2006)
- Rosa 'Watercolors Home Run', (2012)

== Awards ==
- Portland Gold Medal, (1995)
- All-America Rose Selections (AARS), (1984)

== See also ==
- Garden roses
- Rose Hall of Fame
- List of Award of Garden Merit roses
