= Rosa 'Sexy Rexy' =

Rose cultivar

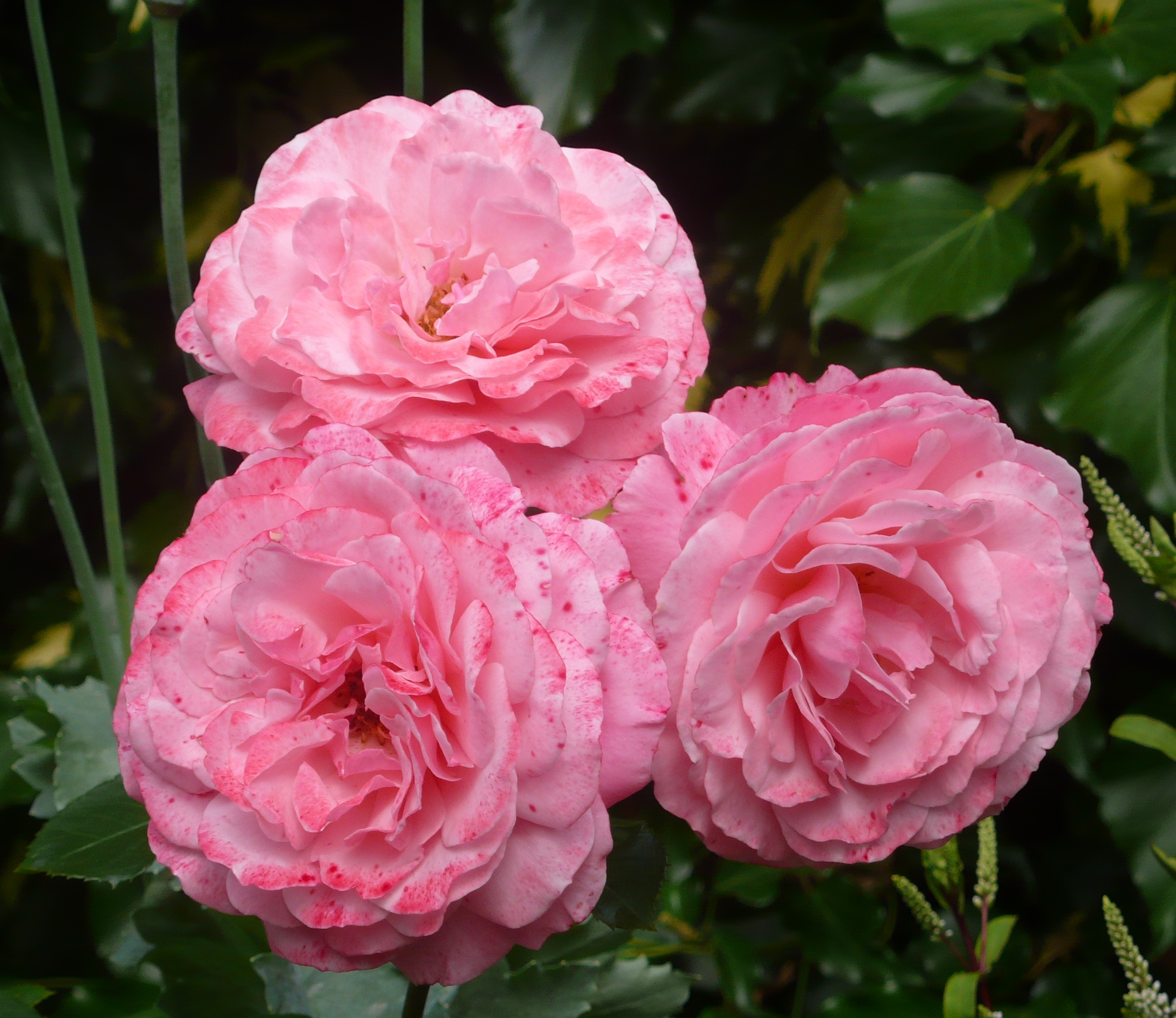
- Rosa 'Sexy Rexy'
- Genus: Rosa hybrid
- Hybrid parentage: 'Seaspray' x 'Dreaming'
- Cultivar group: Floribunda
- Cultivar: MACrexy
- Marketing names: 'Sexy Rexy', 'Heckenzauber'
- Breeder: McGredy IV
- Origin: New Zealand, 1984

Rosa 'Sexy Rexy' (aka MACrexy) is a floribunda rose cultivar, developed by Sam McGredy IV, and introduced into New Zealand by McGredy Roses International in 1984. The stock parents of this rose are the hybrid musk, Rosa 'Seaspray' and the floribunda, Rosa 'Dreaming'.

== Description ==
'Sexy Rexy' is a compact, upright shrub, 2 to 3 ft (60—90 cm) in height with a 2 to 3 ft (60—91 cm) spread. Blooms are medium, with an average diameter of 2—3 in (5—7 cm), with 39 to 51 petals. Flowers are a medium pink and have a mild fragrance. Blooms have a cupped, rosette bloom form, and are borne mostly small clusters. Foliage is medium, semi-glossy and drk green in color. 'Sexy Rexy' is a prolific bloomer, and will bloom in flushes throughout its growing season. The plant does best in USDA zone 6b and warmer.

== Child plants ==
'Sexy Rexy' was used to hybridize the following plants:

- Rosa 'Auckland Metro', (1987)
- Rosa 'Crystal Palace', (1995)
- Rosa 'Fabulous', (1998)
- Rosa 'Miriam', (1989)
- Rosa 'Mount Hood', (1988)
- Rosa Singin' in the Rain, (1984)
- Rosa 'Stretch Johnson', (2012)

== Awards ==
- Portland Gold Medal, (1990)
- New Zealand Gold Medal, (1984)
- Glasgow Gold Medal, (1989)
- James Mason Gold Medal (1988)

== See also ==
- Garden roses
- Rose Hall of Fame
- List of Award of Garden Merit roses
