= Rosa 'New Zealand' =

Rose cultivar

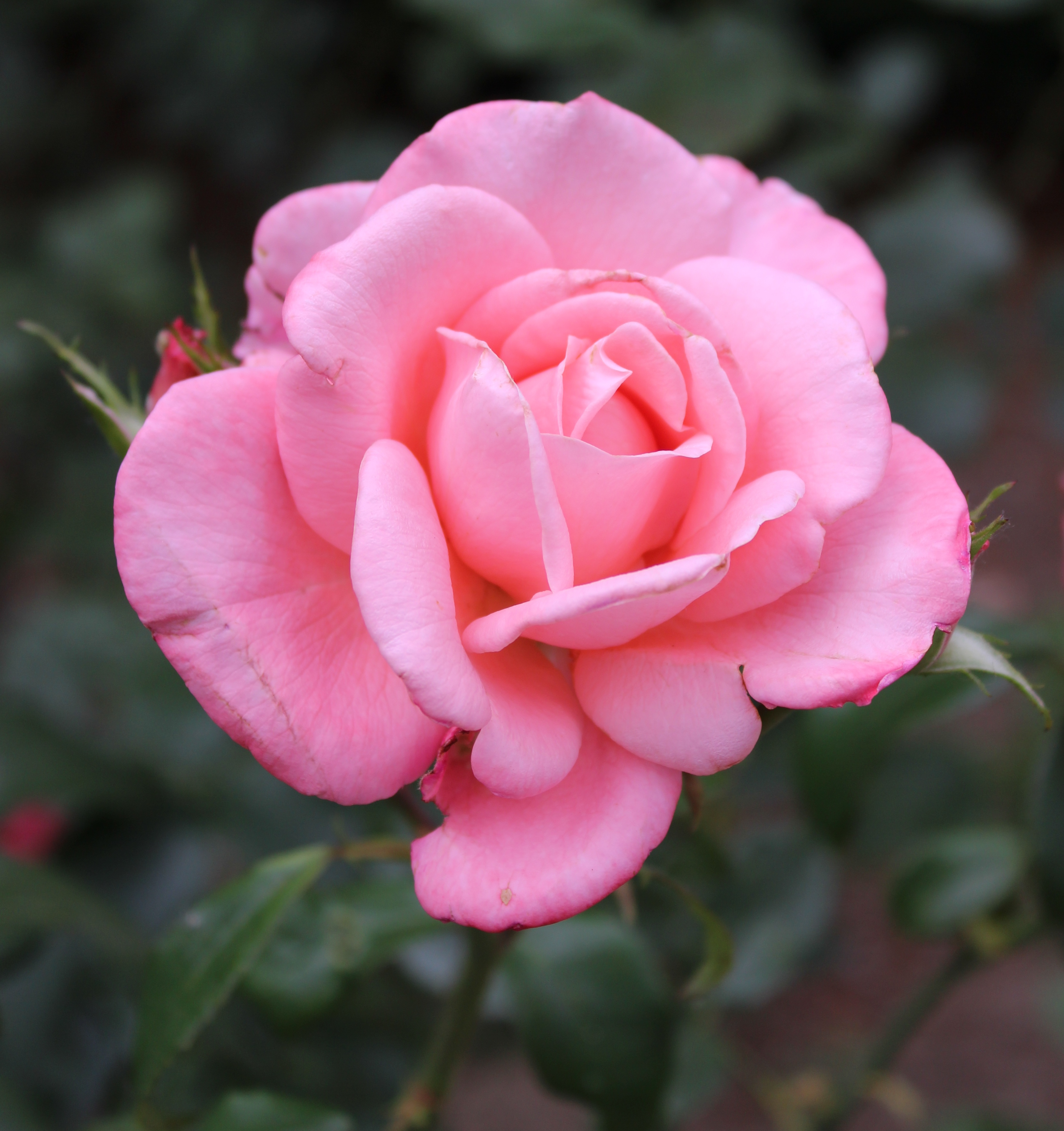
- Rosa 'New Zealand'
- Genus: Rosa hybrid
- Hybrid parentage: Harmonie (Floribunda) x Auckland Metro (hybrid tea)
- Cultivar group: Hybrid tea rose
- Cultivar: MACgenev
- Marketing names: 'Aotearoa New Zealand', 'New Zealand',
- Breeder: Samuel McGredy IV
- Origin: New Zealand, 1989

Rosa 'New Zealand', also known as 'Aotearoa New Zealand', is a pink Hybrid tea rose rose cultivar, developed in New Zealand by Samuel McGredy IV in 1989. The rose was introduced by McGredy Roses International (New Zealand) in 1991 as 'Aotearoa'.

== History ==
'New Zealand' was developed by Samuel McGredy IV in New Zealand in 1989. The rose is a cross between Hybrid tea roses 'Harmonie' and 'Auckland Metro'. McGredy created a unique double name for the rose, 'Aotearoa New Zealand', to honor the Maori and the European cultures of New Zealand on the occasion of the country's 150th anniversary. ‘Aotearoa’ means Land of the Long White Cloud in the Maori language.

== Description ==
'New Zealand' is a medium tall upright shrub, 3 to 5 ft (91-152 cm) in height. Blooms are large with an average diameter of 4-5 in (10-12 cm) and have 25 to 34 petals. Petals are light pink on their upper sides with a darker peach pink on the reverse. Flowers have a strong, sweet fragrance and are displayed in single blooms or in clusters on long stems. Foliage is a dark, glossy green.

== Awards ==
- Auckland rose of the year, (1990)
- Hamilton Best Hybrid tea, (1990)
- New Zealand fragrance award, (1990)
- Portland Gold Medal, (1996)

== See also ==
- Garden roses
- Rose Hall of Fame
- List of Award of Garden Merit roses
- All-America Rose Selections
