= Samuel Hole =

English priest, author, and horticulturalist

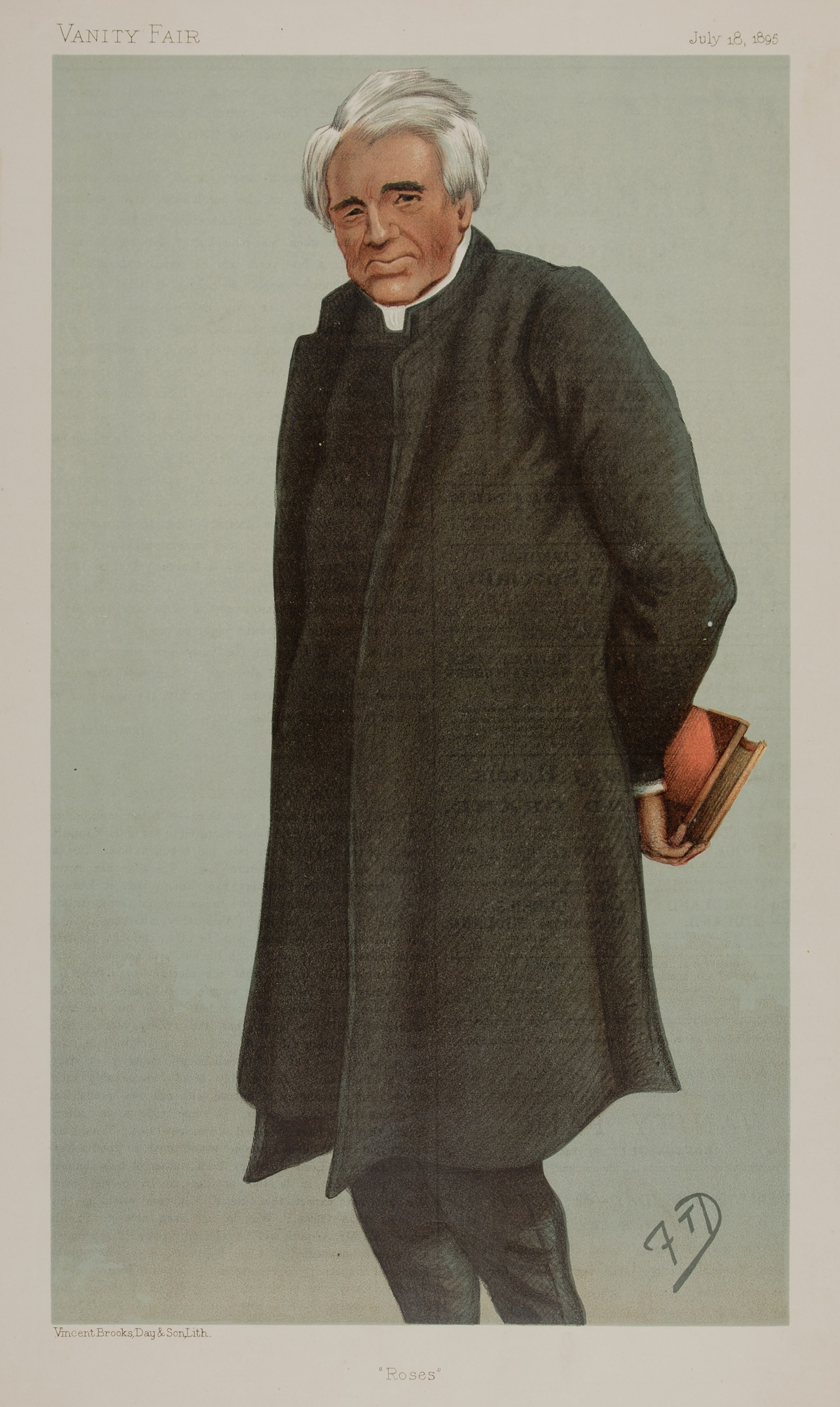
Samuel Hole, 1895

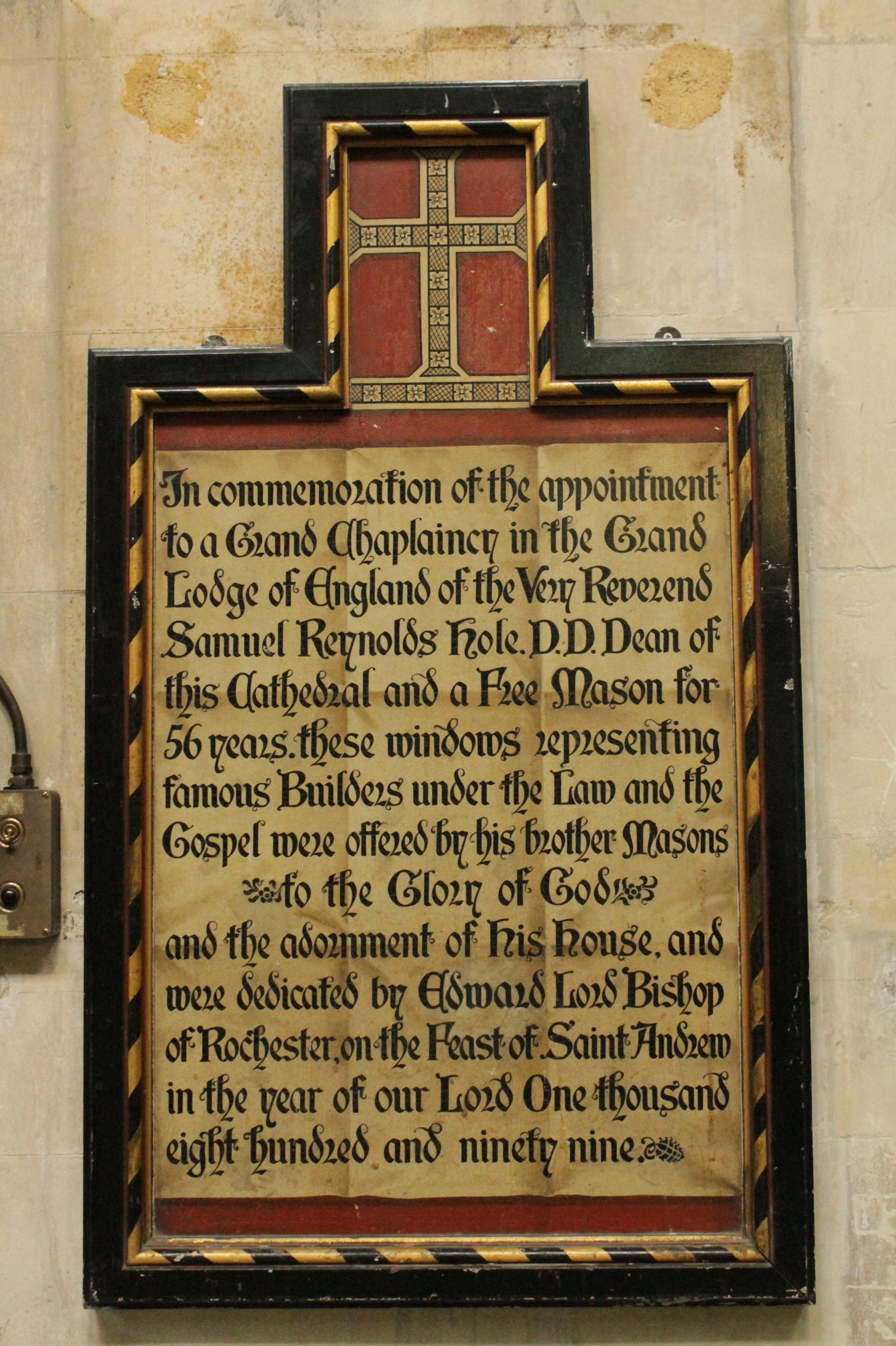
Memorial to Hole, Rochester Cathedral

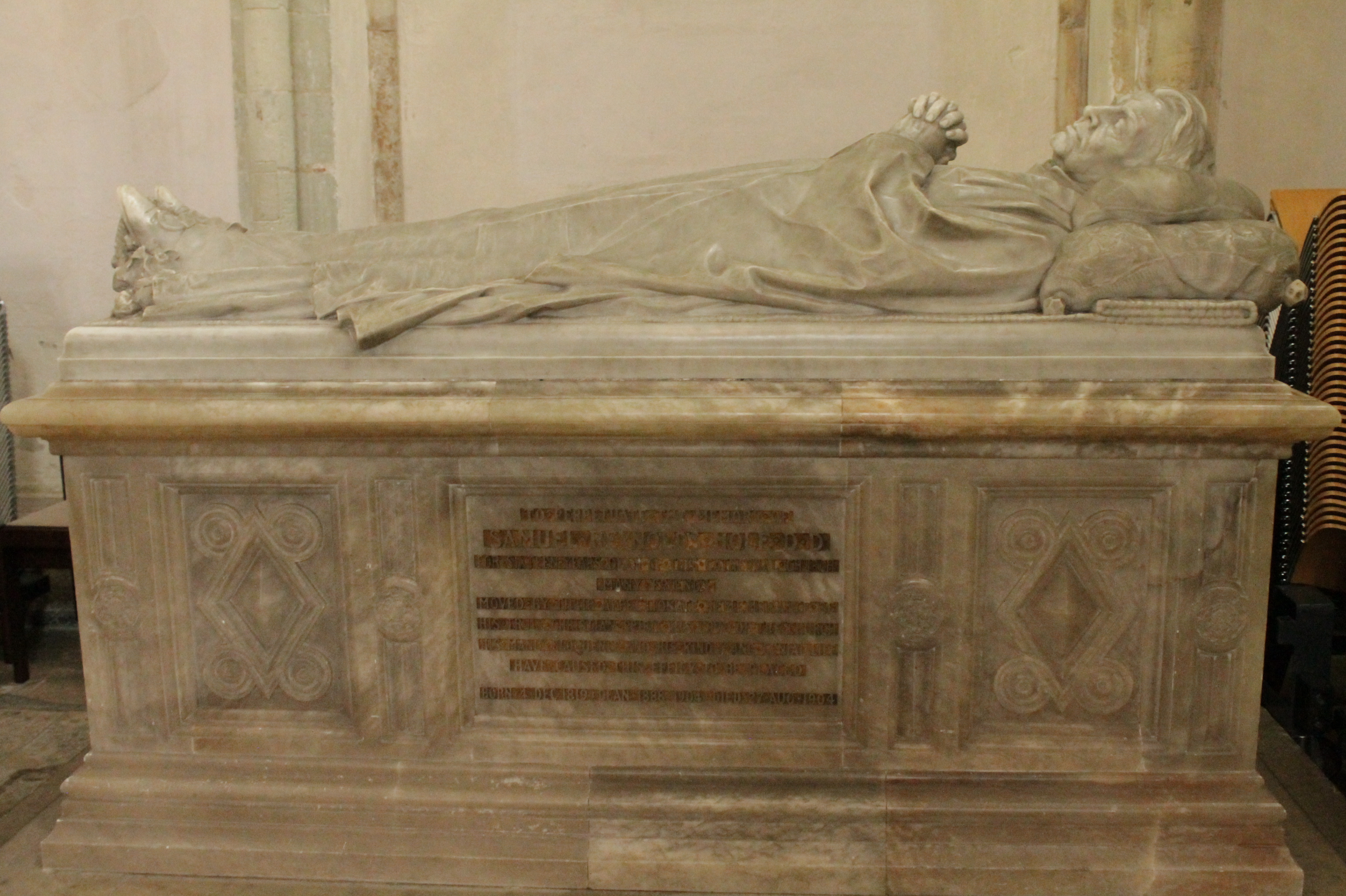
Tomb of Hole, Rochester Cathedral

Samuel Reynolds Hole (5 December 1819 – 27 August 1904), commonly referred to as S. Reynolds Hole, was an English Anglican priest, author and horticulturalist in the late 19th century and the early part of the 20th.

== Life ==
Hole was born at Ardwick near Manchester the only son of Samuel Hole of Caunton Manor and his wife, Mary Cooke of Macclesfield.

He was raised in Newark and educated at Mrs Gilbey's Preparatory School then Magnus Grammar School in Newark. After a period of foreign travel through France, Germany and Italy he studied theology at Brasenose College, Oxford.

During his time at Oxford he took up fox hunting, but never on a Sunday. He came under the influence of the Oxford Movement, in particular the preaching of Drs Keble, Newman and Pusey. Although deeply moved by Newman, Hole remained loyal to the Church of England. He admired a devout and serious approach to religion and recognised it in the Wesleyan Methodists who were working amongst the poor at a time when the Church of England was not.

He was ordained deacon on 22 September 1844 at Lincoln Cathedral and ordained priest in 1845. He spent 43 years at his father's parish of St. Andrew's Church, Caunton, firstly as curate and from 1850 as its vicar. As well as the living of Caunton he was appointed to be rural Dean of Southwell, a Prebenary of Lincoln, in 1873. He had a short period as Select Preacher to Oxford University. He became honorary chaplain to Edward Benson, the then Archbishop of Canterbury, He was in great demand as a preacher across the whole country. Hole was deeply concerned about the working man drawing the parallel between Jesus' background as a carpenter and the honest toil of the poor.

He became Dean of Rochester in 1887. Apparently he welcomed the appointment which brought him into contact with the men in Chatham Dockyard and the local lime and cement works. His preaching continued to be popular, both in the Cathedral at Rochester and in his tours around the country. He retired from preaching tours at the age of 73 and yet embarked on a lecture tour in the United States to raise funds for the cathedral at the age of 75. As Dean his duties were not simply clerical, he had responsibility for the fabric of the medieval cathedral. Under his leadership significant restoration and reconstruction work was carried out. After he turned 80 Hole rarely left Rochester. He died in Rochester on 27 August 1904 and is buried in the churchyard at Caunton.

There are two memorials to Hole at Rochester Cathedral. The most impressive is a recumbent marble life-size figure by F. W. Pomeroy. Hole is further remembered on the number 3 bell at Rochester: "In remembrance of S. Reynolds Hole, Dean. Died 27th August - 1904".

In 1861 he married Caroline Francklin, daughter of John Francklin of Gonalston and Great Barford. They had one son, Samuel Hugh Francklin Hole (b.1862) who became a barrister. Caroline moved to Wateringbury soon after Hole's death where she became an active member of the parish. Eventually she moved to Hawkhurst where she died on 13 February 1916.

== Roses ==
Whilst he was at Caunton Hole received an invitation to judge an Easter Monday rose competition in Nottingham. At this point Hole did not have "a rose in my possession" and at first thought it an April fool prank. However after ascertaining that the roses were grown under glass, Hole did agree to judge the competition. On returning home Hole at once ordered as assortment of roses. In his book, A Book about Roses, Hole describes how his enthusiasm grew until he had 5,000 rose trees spilling out of the garden into his father's farm.

In April 1857 Hole advertised in The Florist proposing a "Grand National Rose-Show". Eventually (described at length in A Book about Roses) the show was held in St James's Hall, London in July 1858. More than 2,000 visitors attended, filling the hall. The fourth rose show (1861) came under the auspices of the Royal Horticultural Society, eventually becoming independent as the National Rose Society.

Hole was noted for his expertise with roses and an inaugural recipient of the Royal Horticultural Society's Victoria Medal of Honour.

After Hole's move to Rochester the Deanery garden was transformed by his wife's labours. Hole spent more time in the garden as he ceased travelling to preach. There were herbaceous borders and of course roses, up to 135 different varieties.

== Publications ==
- Hints to Freshmen (1847)
- A Little Tour in Ireland (1859) illus. by John Leech
- A Book about Roses (1869)
- Hints to Preachers (1880)
- Nice and her Neighbours (1881)
- Memories of Dean Hole (1892)
- Addresses Spoken to Working Men (1894)
- A Book about the Garden and the Gardener (1899)
- Our Gardens (1899)
- Then and Now (1901)

Church of England titles
Preceded by Robert Scott	Dean of Rochester; 1887–1904	Succeeded by Ernald Lane
