= Portland Gold Award =

Award given by the Portland Rose Society

The Portland Gold Award is given annually by the Portland Rose Society to new rose cultivars that demonstrate exceptional performance in the Pacific Northwest of the United States. The first award was given in 1919 by the city of Portland, Oregon.

== History ==
The Portland Rose Society began as an informal rose society in 1888, organized by Georgiana Pittock, wife of the first Oregonian publisher, Henry Pittock. The first rose competition was held in Pittock's garden. She had been inspired to form the gardening club after a holiday in England, where she toured rose gardens and attended a rose show. The next year, Pittock turned her backyard rose competition into a fundraiser for her church. She added a judging tent to her garden and charged admission to the event. This annual event would later include a city parade, where local gardeners would strip their gardens of all but competition roses to decorate cars, horses, floats and wagons. From these early beginnings, the Portland Rose Festival was born. The group officially established the Portland Rose Society as a formal gardening organization in 1907, and established the annual tradition of a judged, flower competition. It is the oldest and largest rose society in the United States.

== Portland Gold Award winners ==
This is a partial list of Portland Gold Award winners.

Award Year	Cultivar	Marketing Name	Hybridizer	Country	Cultivar Group	Color	Image
1941		'Charlotte Armstrong'	Lammerts (US)	USA	Hybrid Tea	Pink	
1951		'Chrysler Imperial'	Lammerts	United States	Hybrid Tea	Red	
1954		'Queen Elizabeth'	Lammerts	United States	Grandiflora	Pink	
1954		'Tiffany'	Lindquist	United States	Hybrid Tea	Pink blend	
1955		'Spartan'	Boerner	United States	Grandiflora	Orange blend	
1955		'Ena Harkness'	Norman	Great Britain	Hybrid Tea	Crimson red	
1961		'Royal Highness'	Morey	United States	Floribunda	Pink	
1962	JOHnago	' Chicago Peace'	Johnston	United States	Hybrid tea	Pink blend	
1966	MEIdaud	'Miss All-American Beauty'	Meilland	France	Hybrid tea	Bright pink	
1966	TANellis	Fragrant Cloud'	Tantau	Germany	Hybrid tea	Orange blend	
1967		'Bewitched'	Lammerts	United States	Hybrid tea	Candy pink	
1967		'Pascali'	Lens	Belgium	Hybrid tea	White blend	
1970		'Europeana'	de Ruiter Innovations	Belgium	Floribunda	Red	
1973		'Electron'	McGredy IV	Northern Ireland	Hybrid tea	Medium pink	
1975	MACha	'Handel'	McGredy IV	Northern Ireland	Modern climber	Pink blend	
1977	JACven	'Evening Star'	Warriner	United States	Floribunda	White	
1978	JAColite	'Honor'	Warriner	United States	Hybrid tea	White	
1980	JACtwin	'Love'	Warriner	United States	Grandiflora	Red blend	
1980	JACtwin	'Love'	Warriner	United States	Grandiflora	Red blend	
1981		'Silver Jubilee'	Alec Cocker	Great Britain	Hybrid tea	Apricot blend	
1986	JACjem	'Sun Flare'	Warriner	United States	Floribunda	Yellow	
1990	MACrexy	'Sexy Rexy'	McGredy IV	New Zealand	Floribunda	Medium pink	
1993		'Sally Holmes'	Holmes	Great Britain	Shrub rose	White blend	
1996	MACgenev	'New Zealand'	McGredy IV	New Zealand	Grandiflora	Light pink	
1997	HARwelcome	'Livin' Easy'	Harkness	Great Britain	Floribunda	Orange-apricot	
2001	WEKplapic	'Betty Boop'	Carruth	United States	Floribunda	Red & white	
2001	FRYxotic	'Sunset Celebration'	Fryer	Great Britain	Floribunda	Apricot blend	
2002	WEKcryplag	'Blueberry Hill'	Carruth	United States	Floribunda	Mauve blend	
2003	RADrazz	'Knock Out'	Radler	United States	Shrub rose	Red blend	
2006	WEKsunspat	'Marilyn Monroe'	Carruth	United States	Hybrid tea	Apricot blend	
2008	WEKvossutono	'Julia Child'	Carruth	United States	Floribunda	Yellow	
2009	WEKisoblip	'Wild Blue Yonder'	Carruth	United States	Grandiflora	Mauve blend	
2010	WEKbepmey	'Strike It Rich'	Carruth	United States	Grandiflora	Orange-Yellow	
2011	WEKosupalz	'About Face'	Carruth	United States	Grandiflora	Orange blend	
2013	ORAclelon	'Over the Moon'	Orard	France	Hybrid tea	Apricot blend	
2014	WEKmemolo	'Sugar Moon'	Bedard	United States	Hybrid tea	White blend	
2017	KORaruli	'Sunny Sky'	Kordes	Germany	Hybrid tea	Yellow blend	
2018	WEKsirjuci	'Happy Go Lucky'	Bedard	United States	Floribunda	Yellow	
2018	WEKgobafa	'Good as Gold'	Carruth	United States	Hybrid tea	Orange blend	
2019	KORsteflali	'Wedding Bells'	Kordes	Germany	Hybrid tea	Medium pink	
2019	JACgemze	'Crescendo'	Zary	United States	Hybrid tea	Pink blend	
2020	WEKwibysicpep	'Violet's Pride	Bedard	United States	Floribunda	Mauve	

== See also ==
- International Rose Test Garden
- List of Award of Garden Merit roses
- Rose Hall of Fame
- All-America Rose Selections
- ADR rose
