= Rosa 'Blueberry Hill' =

Mauve floribunda rose cultivar

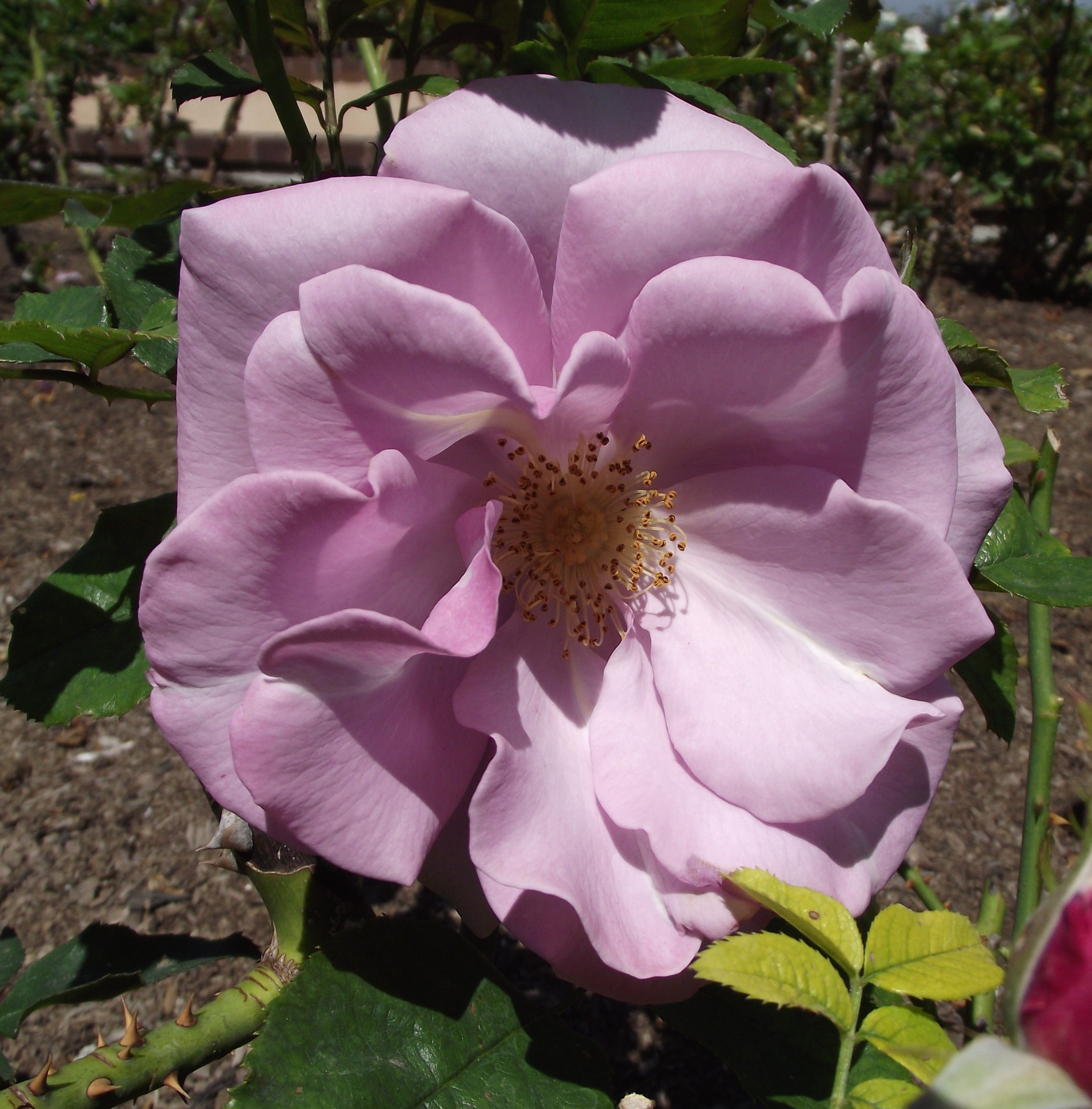
- Rosa 'Blueberry Hill'
- Genus: Rosa hybrid
- Hybrid parentage: 'Crystalline' x 'Playgirl'
- Cultivar group: Floribunda
- Cultivar: WEKcryplag
- Marketing names: 'Blueberry Hill', 'A87-A1'
- Breeder: Carruth
- Origin: United States, 1997

Rosa 'Blueberry Hill', (a.k.a. Wekcryplag ), is a floribunda rose cultivar, bred by Tom Carruth, and introduced into the United States by Weeks Rose Growers in 1997. The plant was created from hybrid tea, 'Crystalline' and floribunda, 'Playgirl'. The cultivar won a Portland Gold Medal in 2002.

== Description ==
'Blueberry Hill' is a medium bushy shrub, 3 to 4 ft (90–121 cm) in height with a 3 to 4 ft (90–121 cm) spread. Blooms are large, 4—5 in (10–12 cm) in diameter, with 12 to 15 petals. The plant bears small clusters of semi-double flowers with a flat to cupped bloom form. Buds are large, long and pointed. The flowers are a mauve blend with shades of lavender. The rose has a moderate, apple, fruity fragrance and large, semi-glossy, dark green foliage. 'Blueberry Hill' is very disease resistant. It blooms in flushes from spring through fall. The plants does well in USDA zone 5 to 9.

== History ==
=== Tom Carruth ===
Carruth began his career at Jackson & Perkins rose nursery in 1975. He worked at the company for three years before being hired by Armstrong nursery in southern California. He worked at Armstrong for seven years, working with rose hybridizer, Jack Christensen. In 1986, Carruth began working at Weeks Wholesale Rose Grower. He worked at Weeks for twenty six years, and was the nursery's rose hybridizer from 1989 until his retirement in 2012. During his forty-year career, Carruth introduced more than 100 rose varieties, including eleven All-America Rose Selections (AARS).

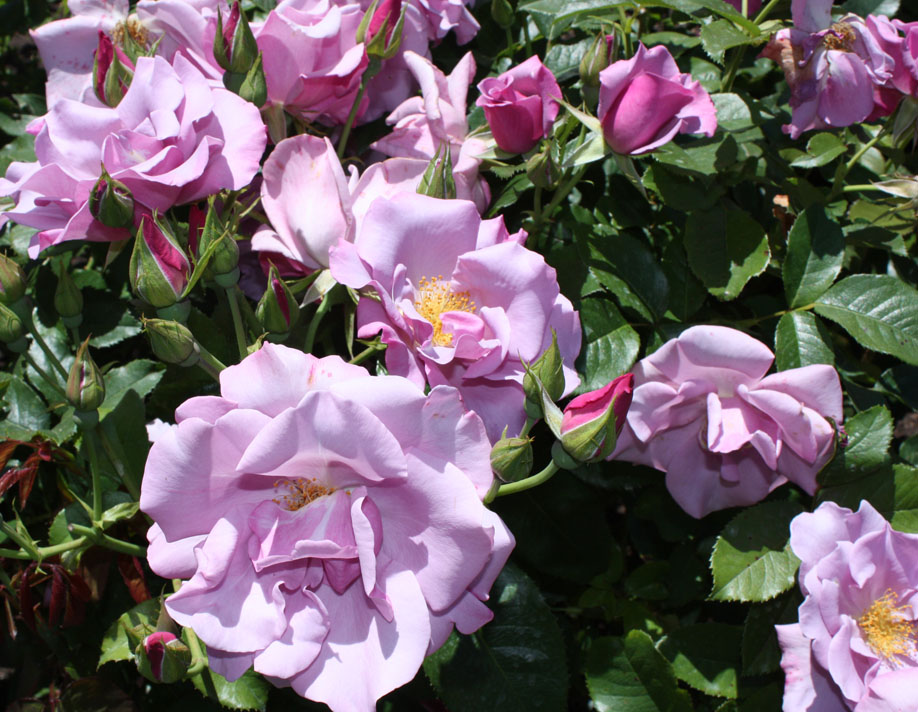
'Blueberry Hill'

=== 'Blueberry Hill' ===
'Blueberry Hill' was developed by Carruth and introduced into the United States by Weeks Wholesale Rose Grower, Inc. in 1997. The stock parents of this rose are the Hybrid tea rose, 'Crystalline' and the Floribunda, 'Playgirl'. The cultivar was used to develop five new rose varieties: 'Memorial Day' (2001), 'Neptune' (2003), 'Wild Blue Yonder' (2004), 'Koko Loco' (2010), and 'Love Song 2011' (2011). 'Blueberry Hill' has won multiple regional awards in the United States, including the Corpus Christi, Texas Rose Society Show in 1999, the Garden State (New Jersey) Rose Club in 2000 and the California Coastal Rose Society Rose Show in 2001.

== International Awards ==
- Portland Gold Medal, (2002)

== See also ==
- Garden roses
- Rose Hall of Fame
- List of Award of Garden Merit roses
