= Rosa 'Pascali' =

Rose cultivar

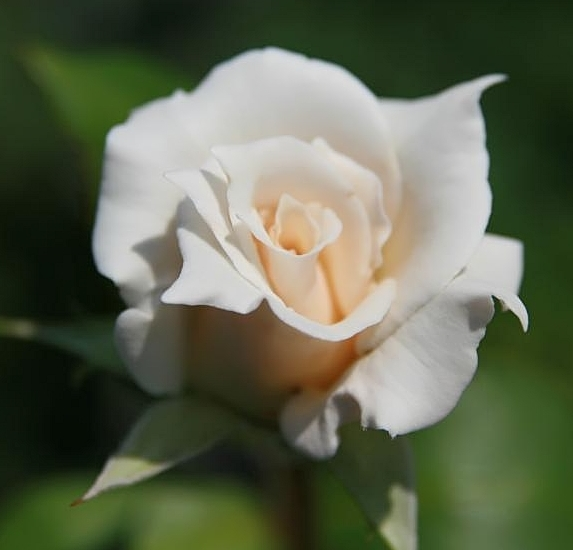
- Rosa 'Pascali'
- Genus: Rosa hybrid
- Hybrid parentage: 'Queen Elizabeth' x 'White Butterfly'
- Cultivar group: Hybrid tea
- Cultivar: LENip
- Marketing names: 'Pascali', 'Blanche Pasca'
- Breeder: Lens
- Origin: Belgium, 1963

Rosa 'Pascali', (aka LENip ), is a white hybrid tea rose cultivar, bred by Louis Lens in Belgium in 1963. It was created from a hybridization of Rosa 'Queen Elizabeth' and Rosa 'White Butterfly'. 'Pascali' has won numerous awards, including the Portland Gold Medal in 1967, the All-America Rose Selections award in 1969, and induction into the Rose Hall of Fame as "World's Favourite Rose" in 1991.

== Description ==
'Pascali' is a tall, upright shrub, 4 to 7 ft (121—200 cm) in height with a 3 to 4 ft (90—121 cm) spread. Blooms are large, 4—5 in (10—12 cm) in diameter, high-centered in form with tough petals (26—40). Flowers are slow to open, and are borne singly on long stems, which makes them an excellent exhibition and cutting rose. The flowers are a clear white with an ivory reverse. The rose has a mild, sweet fragrance and large, dark green foliage. 'Pascali' blooms in flushes throughout its growing season. The plant does well in USDA zone 7 and warmer.

== Child plants ==
'Pascali' was used to hybridize the following plants:

- Rosa 'Dr. Darley', (1980)
- Rosa 'Margaret Merril', (1978)
- Rosa 'Mon Jardin et Ma Maison', (before 1998)
- Rosa 'Pegasus', (1995)
- Rosa 'Poustinia', (1994)
- Rosa 'Helene de Gerlache', (1982)

== Awards ==
- The Hague Gold Medal, (1963)
- Portland Gold Medal, (1967)
- All-America Rose Selections, (1969)
- Rose Hall of Fame, (1991)

== See also ==
- Garden roses
- Rose Hall of Fame
- List of Award of Garden Merit roses
