= Rosa 'Honor' =

White hybrid tea rose cultivar

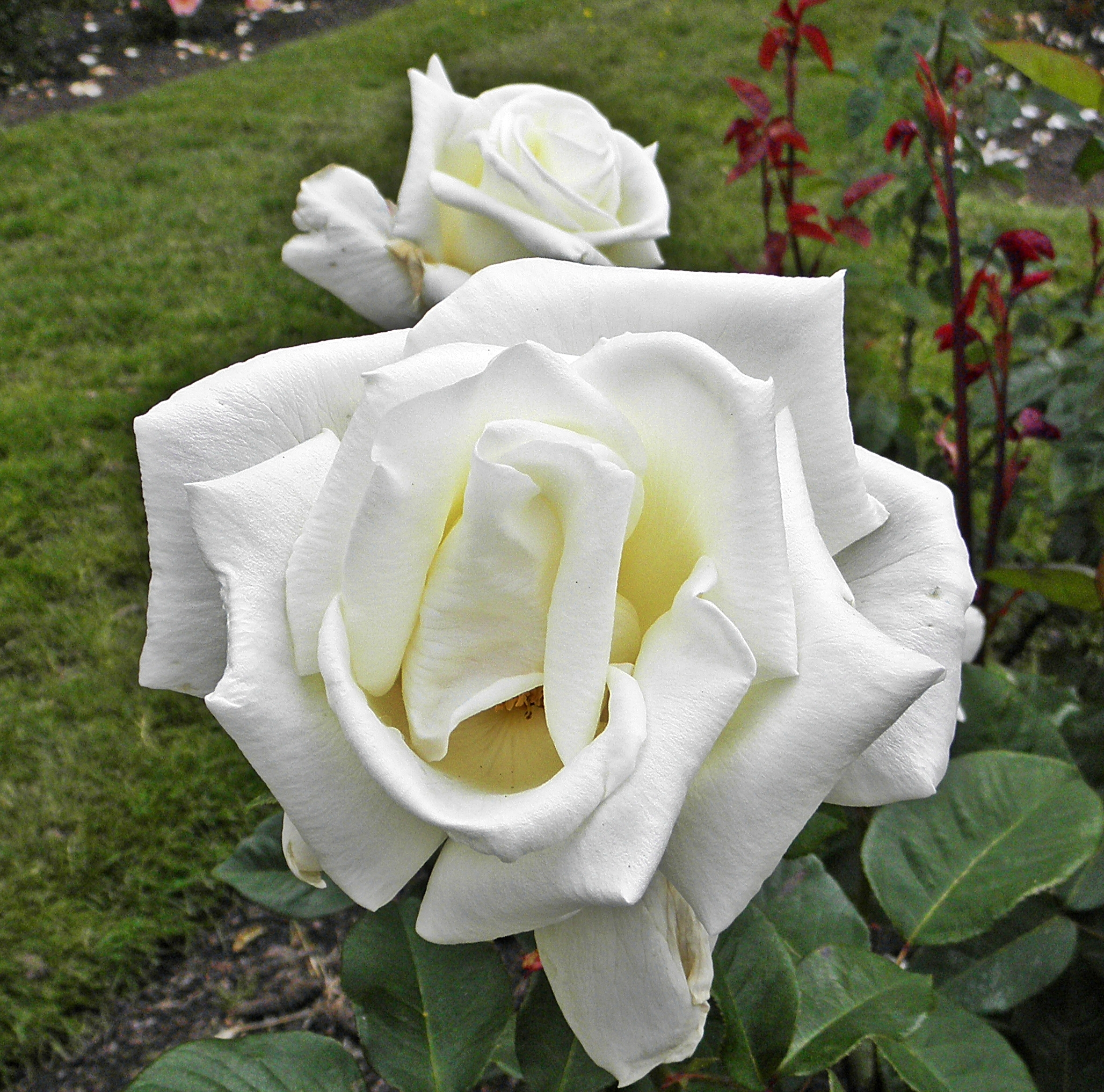
- Rosa 'Honor'
- Genus: Rosa hybrid
- Hybrid parentage: 'Unnamed seedling' x 'Unnamed seedling'
- Cultivar group: Hybrid tea
- Cultivar: JAColite
- Marketing names: 'Honor', 'Silhouette', 'Michèle Torr', 'Silver Medal'
- Breeder: Warriner
- Origin: United States, 1980

Rosa 'Honor', (a.k.a. JAColite ), is a white blend hybrid tea rose cultivar, developed by William Warriner, and introduced into the United States by Jackson & Perkins in 1980. The cultivar was the recipient of the Portland Gold Medal in 1978 and was an All-America Rose Selections winner in 1980.

== Description ==
'Honor' is a medium-tall, upright shrub, 4 to 6 ft (121—182 cm) in height with a 2 to 4 ft (60—121 cm) spread. Blooms are large, with an average diameter of 4—5 in (10—12 cm). Flowers open from long, pointed buds and are bright white with light cream hues. The rose has a mild fragrance. Flowers have a double (16-25 petals), high-centered bloom form. Flowers are borne mostly solitary on long, thick stems, in small clusters. Leaves are large, dark green, and bronzy-red when new foliage. 'Honor' blooms in flushes from spring through autumn. The plant does best in USDA zone 7b and warmer.

== Child plants ==
'Honor' was used to hybridize the following plants:

- Rosa 'Aromatherapy', (2005)
- Rosa 'Signature', (1998 )
- Rosa 'Starla', (1990)

== Awards ==
- Portland Gold Medal, (1978)
- All-America Rose Selections (AARS), (1980)

== See also ==
- Garden roses
- Rose Hall of Fame
- List of Award of Garden Merit roses
