= Rosa 'Chicago Peace' =

Hybrid tea rose cultivar

Rosa 'Spartan'
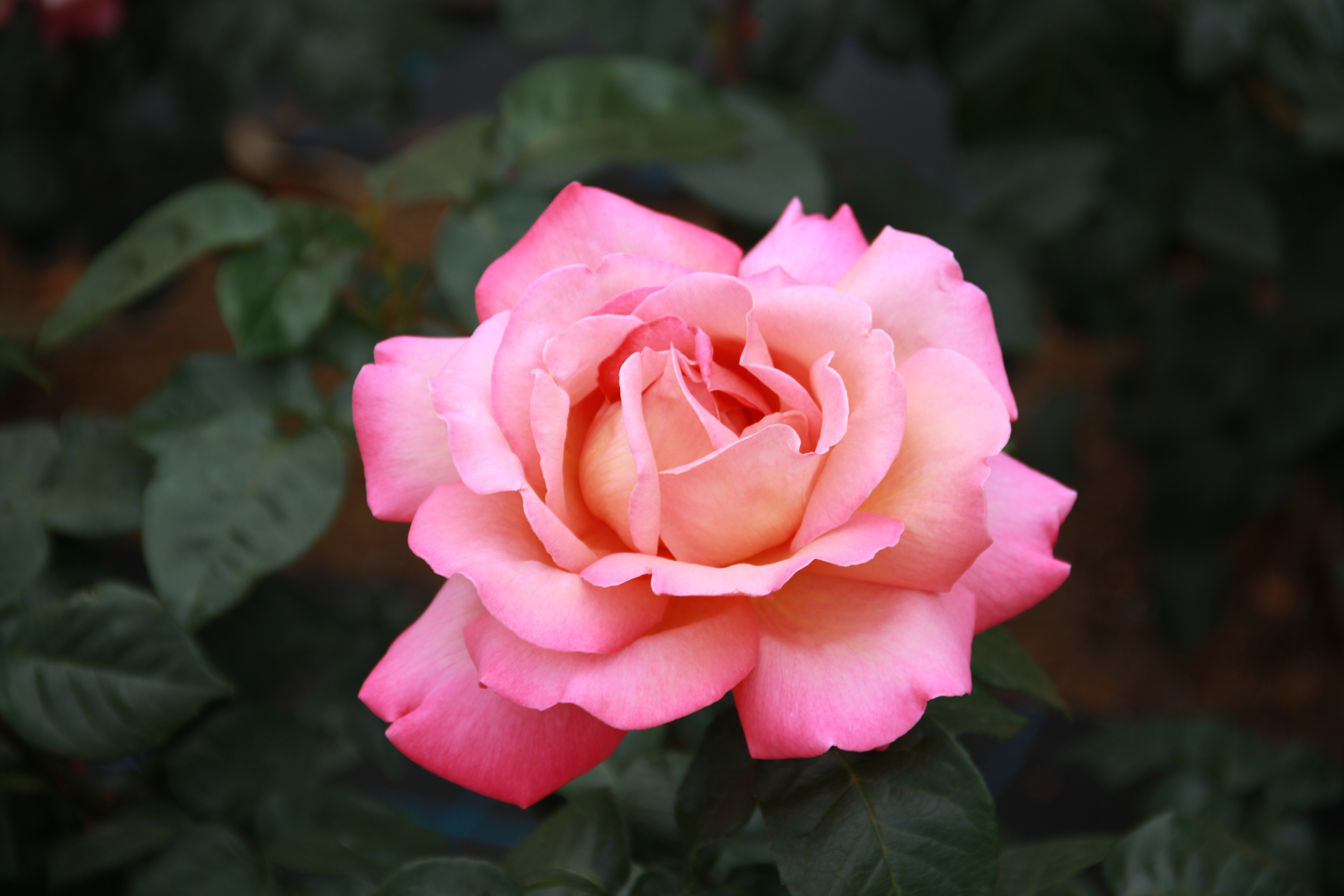
- Rosa 'Chicago Peace'
- Genus: Rosa hybrid
- Hybrid parentage: sport of Rosa 'Peace'
- Cultivar group: Hybrid tea
- Cultivar: JOHnago
- Breeder: Johnston
- Origin: United States, 1962

Rosa 'Chicago Peace' (also known as JOHnago) is a hybrid tea rose cultivar – a sport of the well-known 'Peace' rose, discovered by Stanley Johnston. It was introduced into the United States in 1956, by Star Roses. 'Chicago Peace' was the recipient of the Portland Gold Medal in 1962.

== Description ==
'Chicago Peace' is a tall, upright shrub, 4 to 7 ft (121–213 cm) in height with a 2 to 3 ft (60–90 cm) spread. Blooms are very large, with an average diameter of 6 in (15.24 cm). Flowers are a blend of pink, yellow and orange, and have a mild fragrance. Blooms are high-centered, very full (40+ petals) and have a cupped bloom form. Flowers are borne mostly solitary, with large, glossy, dark green, leathery foliage. The plant blooms in flushes from spring through autumn, and is sometimes prone to blackspot in autumn. It thrives in USDA zone 7 and warmer. 'Chicago Peace' was used to hybridize two child plants, the hybrid tea roses: 'Don Charlton' (1991) and 'Desert Peace' (1991).

== Awards ==
- Portland Gold Medal, (1962)

== See also ==
- Garden roses
- Rose Hall of Fame
- All-America Rose Selections
- List of Award of Garden Merit roses
