= Rosa 'Spartan' =

Floribunda rose cultivar

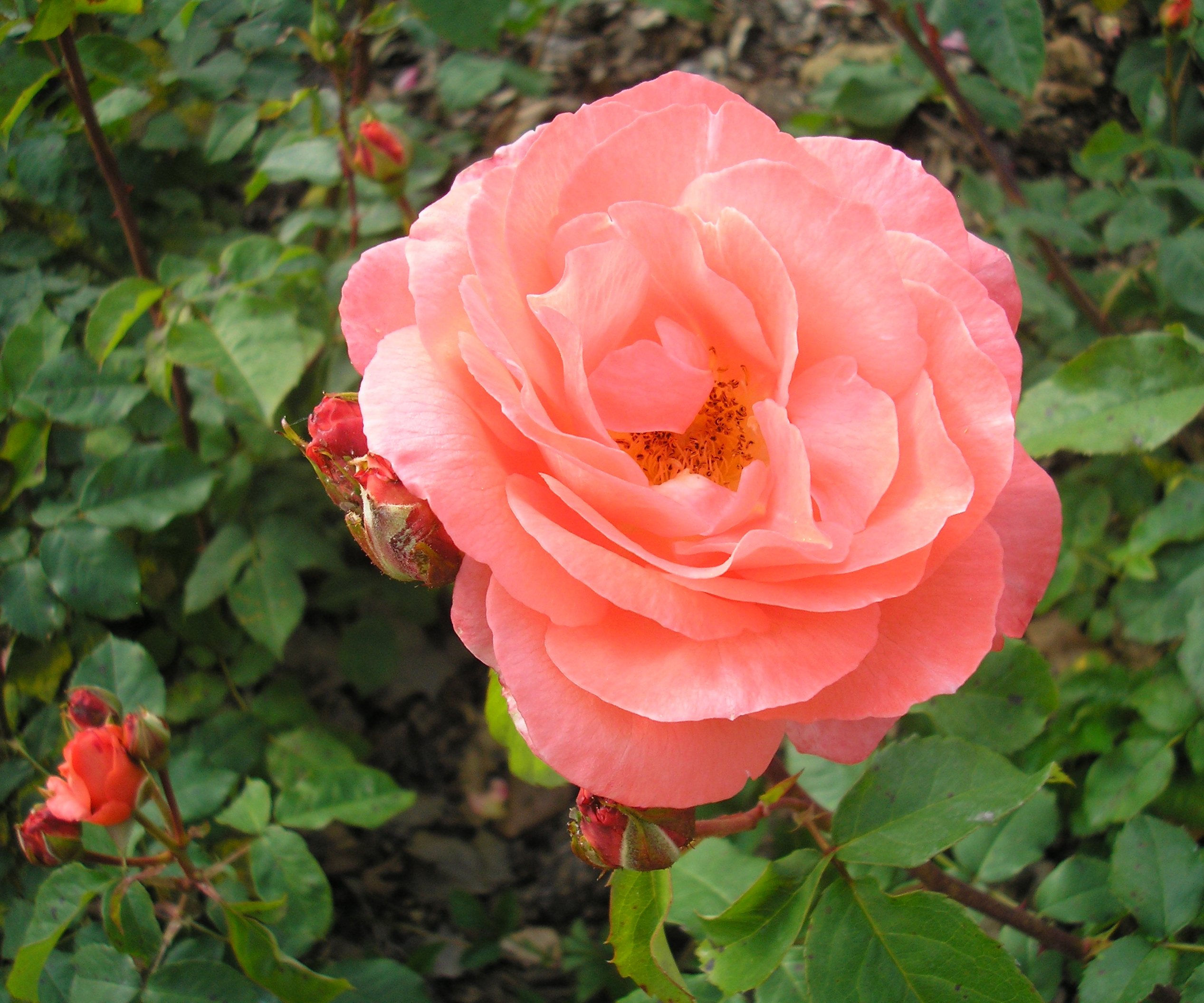
- Rosa 'Spartan'
- Genus: Rosa hybrid
- Hybrid parentage: 'Geranium Red' and 'Fashion'
- Cultivar group: Floribunda
- Breeder: Boerner
- Origin: United States, 1955

Rosa 'Spartan' is a floribunda rose cultivar, bred by Gene Boerner, and introduced into Australia in 1956 by Hazlewood Bros. Pty. Ltd. The plant's stock parents are florinda roses, 'Geranium Red' and 'Fashion'. 'Tiffany' was the recipient of the Portland Gold Medal in 1955.

== Description ==
'Spartan' is a vigorous, rounded, bushy shrub, 3 to 4 ft (90–121 cm) in height with a 2 to 3 ft (60–90 cm) spread. Blooms have an average diameter of 2 to 3 in (5–7 cm) with 25 to 30 petals. Flowers are a deep orange-pink, and can be more orange in hot climates and pink in cooler climates. Flowers have a strong, fruity fragrance. Blooms are medium-large and have a high-centered bloom form. Flowers are borne mostly solitary or in small clusters of 3–7, with glossy, dark green, leathery foliage. The buds are large, pointed and ovoid. The plant is a vigorous grower and blooms in flushes from spring through autumn. The plant is sometimes prone to blackspot in autumn. It thrives in USDA zone 6 through 9b.

== Child plants ==
'Spartan' was used to hybridize the following rose cultivars: 'Apricot Nectar', 'Brandenburg, 'Bridal Pink', 'City of Leeds', 'Comanche', 'Duke of Windsor', 'Elizabeth of Glamis, 'Fancy Talk, 'Ginger', 'Gingersnap', 'Mischief, 'Neus Europa', 'Paddy McGredy', 'Princess Michiko', 'Violet Carson', and 'Zorina'.

== Awards ==
- Portland Gold Medal, (1955)

== See also ==
- Garden roses
- Rose Hall of Fame
- All-America Rose Selections
- List of Award of Garden Merit roses
