= Rosa 'New Dawn' =

Rose cultivar

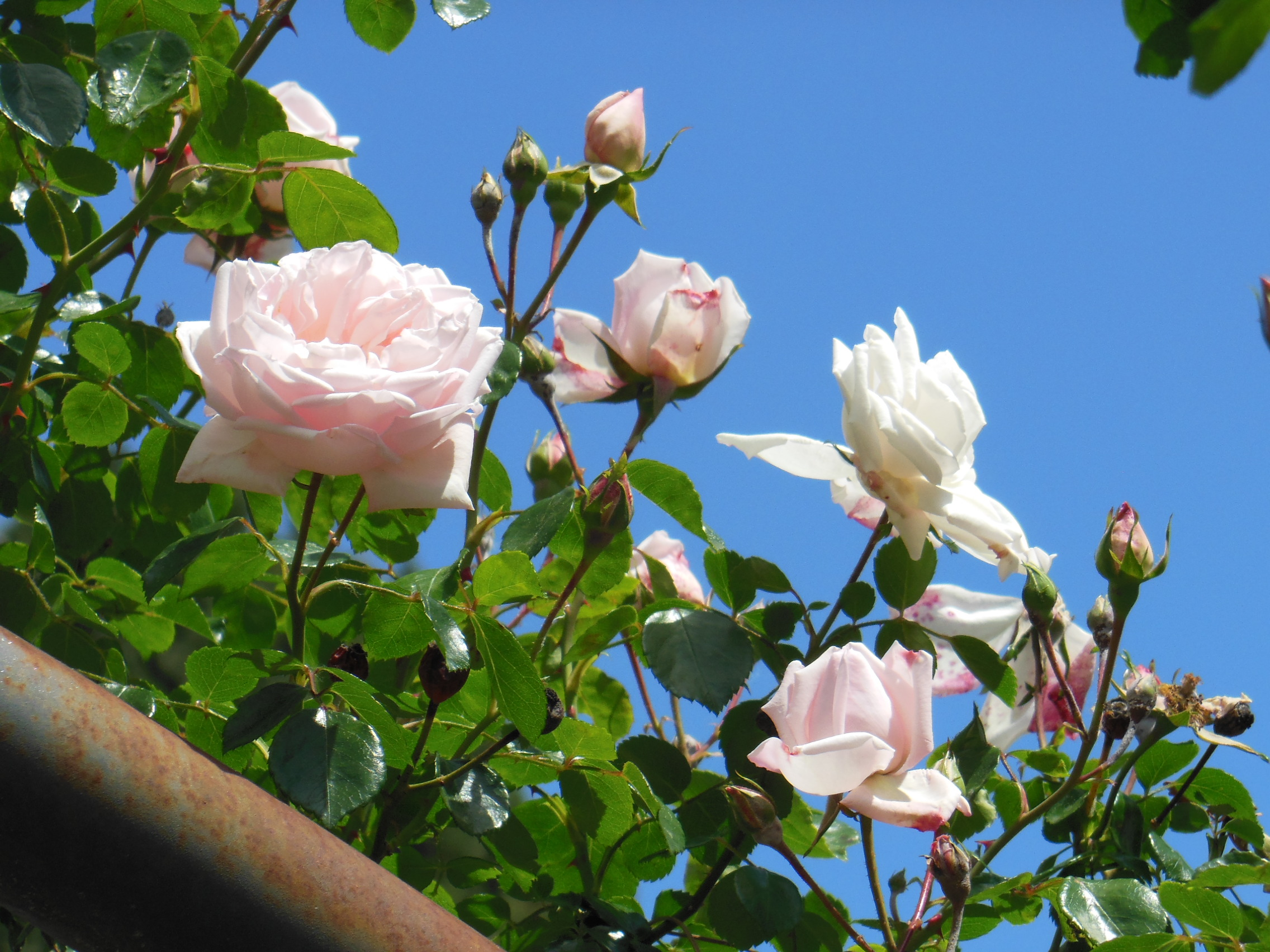
- Rosa 'New Dawn'
- Genus: Rosa hybrid
- Hybrid parentage: Sport of Rosa 'Dr. W. Van Fleet'
- Cultivar group: Modern climbing rose
- Marketing names: 'New Dawn' 'The New Dawn' 'Everblooming Dr. W. Van Fleet'
- Origin: Somerset Rose Nursery, United States (1930)

Rosa 'New Dawn' is a light pink modern climbing rose cultivar, discovered by Somerset Rose Nursery in New Jersey in 1930. The cultivar is a sport (genetic mutation) of Rosa 'Dr. W. Van Fleet'. 'New Dawn' was the first plant to be patented. It was patented by H.F. Bosenberg in 1931. 'New Dawn' was voted the most popular rose in the world at the 11th World Convention of Rose Societies in 1997. It is also recognized worldwide as one of the best of the repeating climbing roses. 'New Dawn' is an Earth-Kind rose.

== Description ==
'New Dawn' is a tall, large-flowered climbing rose, 10 to 20 ft (305–610 cm) in height with a 5 to 6 ft (152–182 cm) spread. Blooms are 3.5 in (8.9 cm) in diameter, with 26 to 40 petals. Flowers have a high-centered, cupped to flat bloom form, and are borne singly or in small clusters. The flowers are light pink in color with a paler pink at the edges, aging to white as the flower matures. The rose has a mild, sweet fragrance and medium-sized, glossy, dark green foliage. In autumn, the rose produces a large number of rose hips. 'New Dawn' blooms in flushes during the growing season, and will often continue to flower through the middle of winter. The plant is recommended for USDA zone 5 and warmer.

== Child plants and sports ==
This is a partial list of 'New Dawn' child plants and sports.

- Rosa 'Aloha', (1949)
- Rosa 'Awakening', sport, (1935)
- Rosa 'Bantry Bay', (1967)
- Rosa 'Blossomtime', (1951)
- Rosa 'City of London', (1986)
- Rosa 'New Dawn White', sport, (1959)
- Rosa 'Don Juan', (1958)
- Rosa 'Fair Eva', (2002)
- Rosa 'Martine Guillot', (1991)
- Rosa 'Miss Liberty', (1956)
- Rosa 'Parade', (1953)
- Rosa 'Penny Lane', (1998)
- Rosa 'Pink Cloud', (1952)
- Rosa 'White Cockade', (1969)
- Rosa 'White Dawn', (1949)

== 'New Dawn' gallery ==
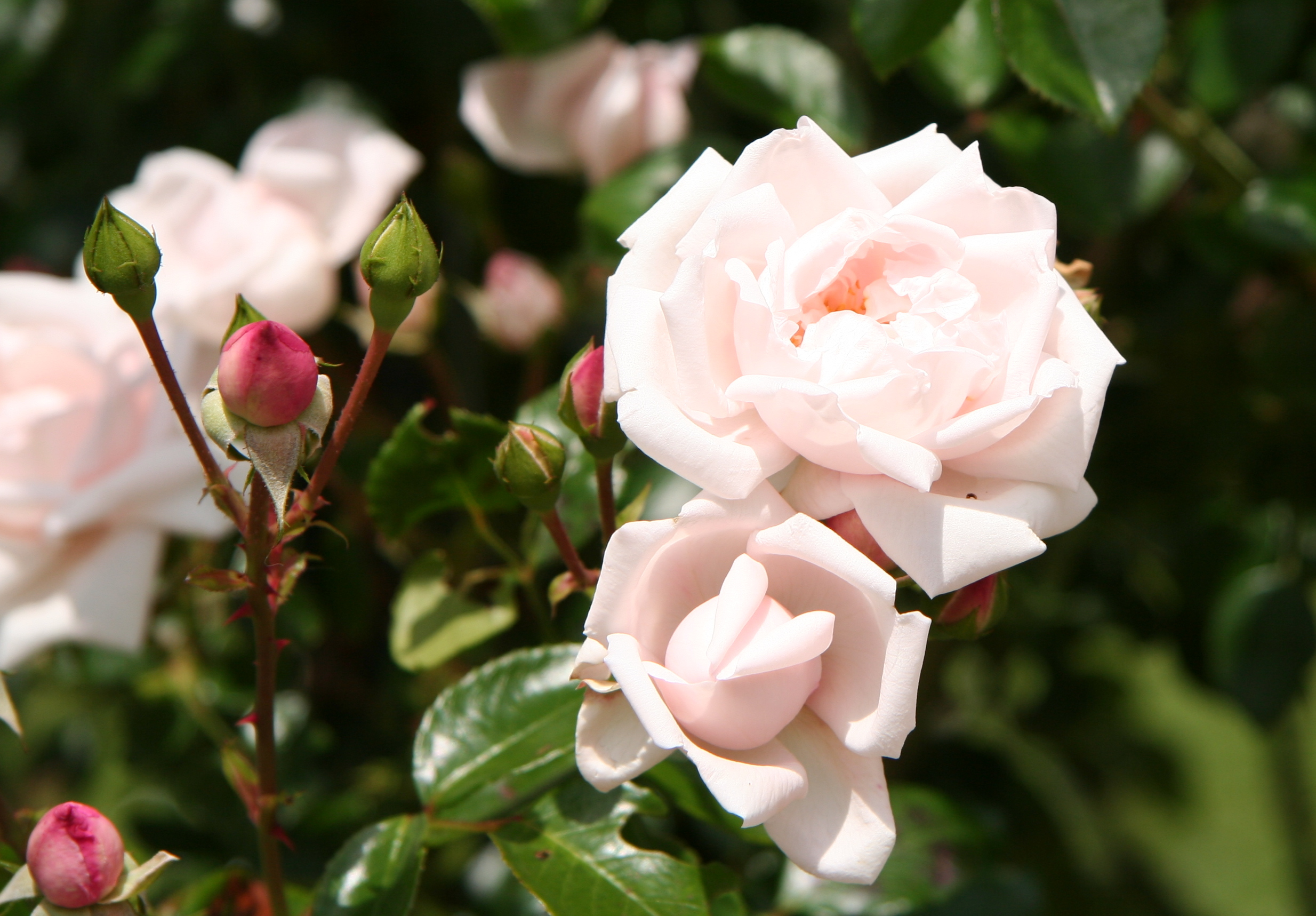

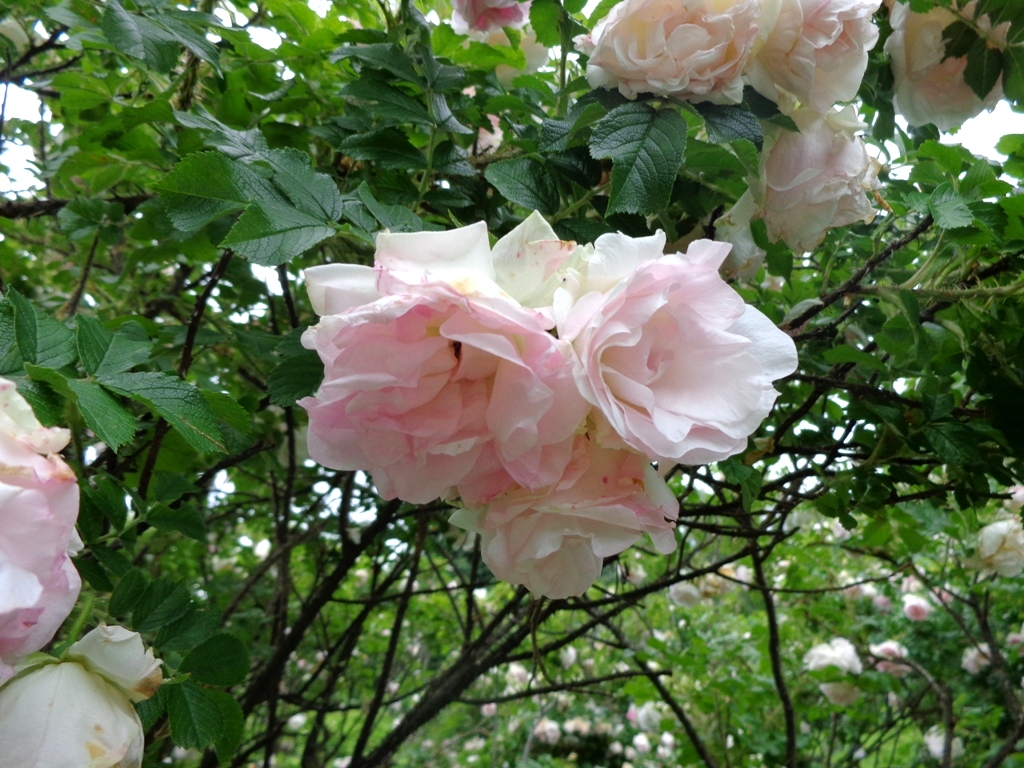

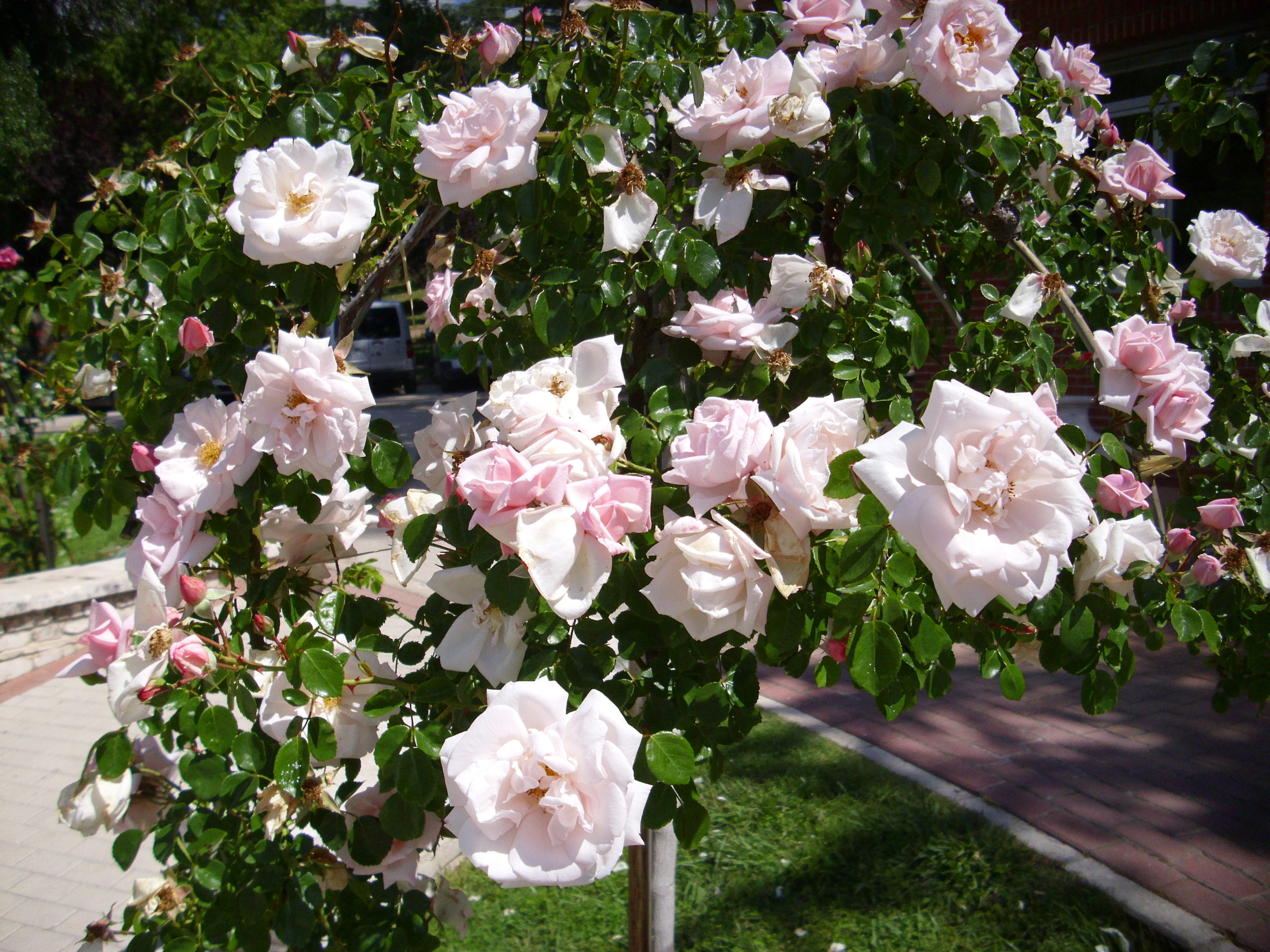

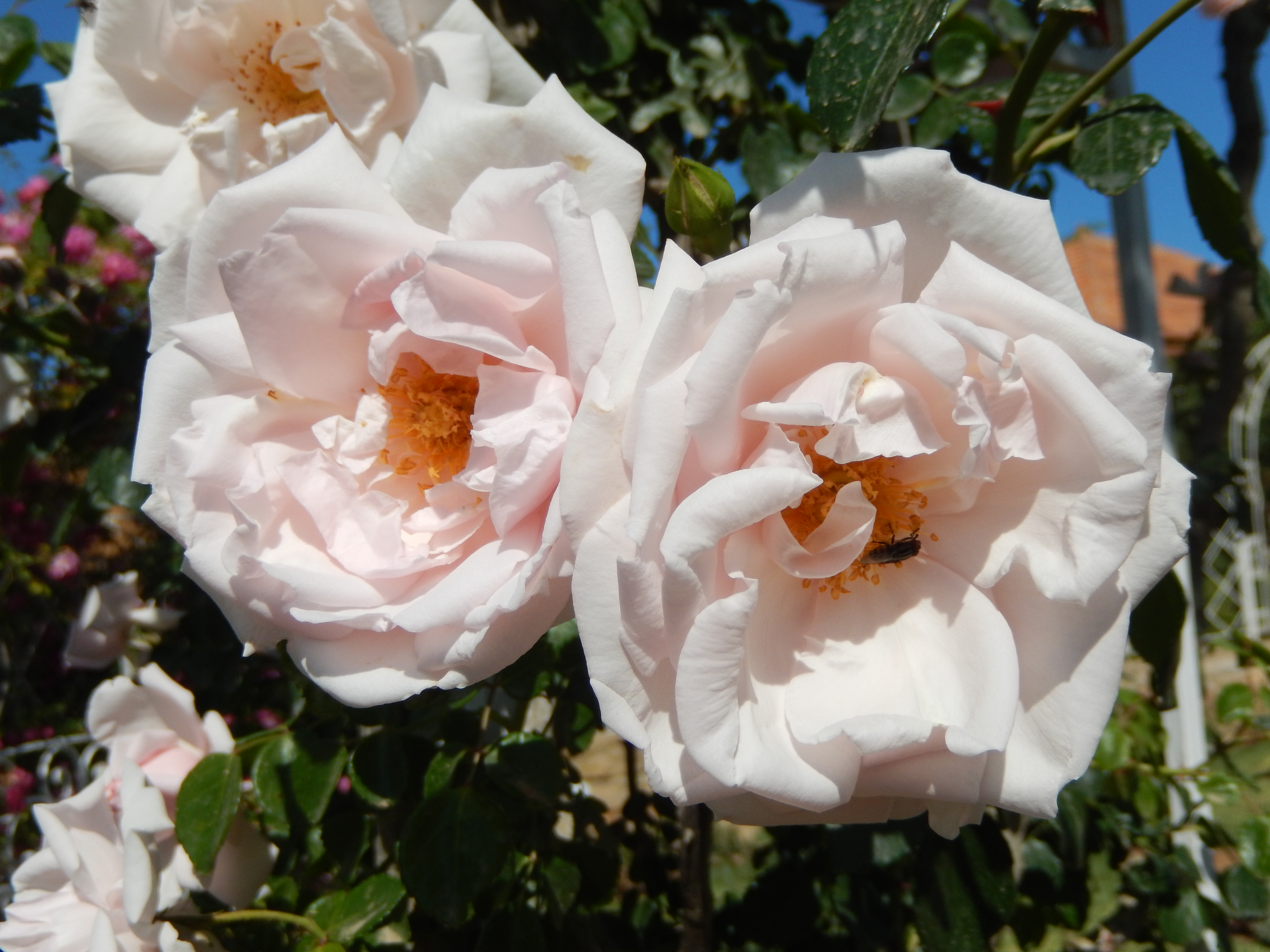

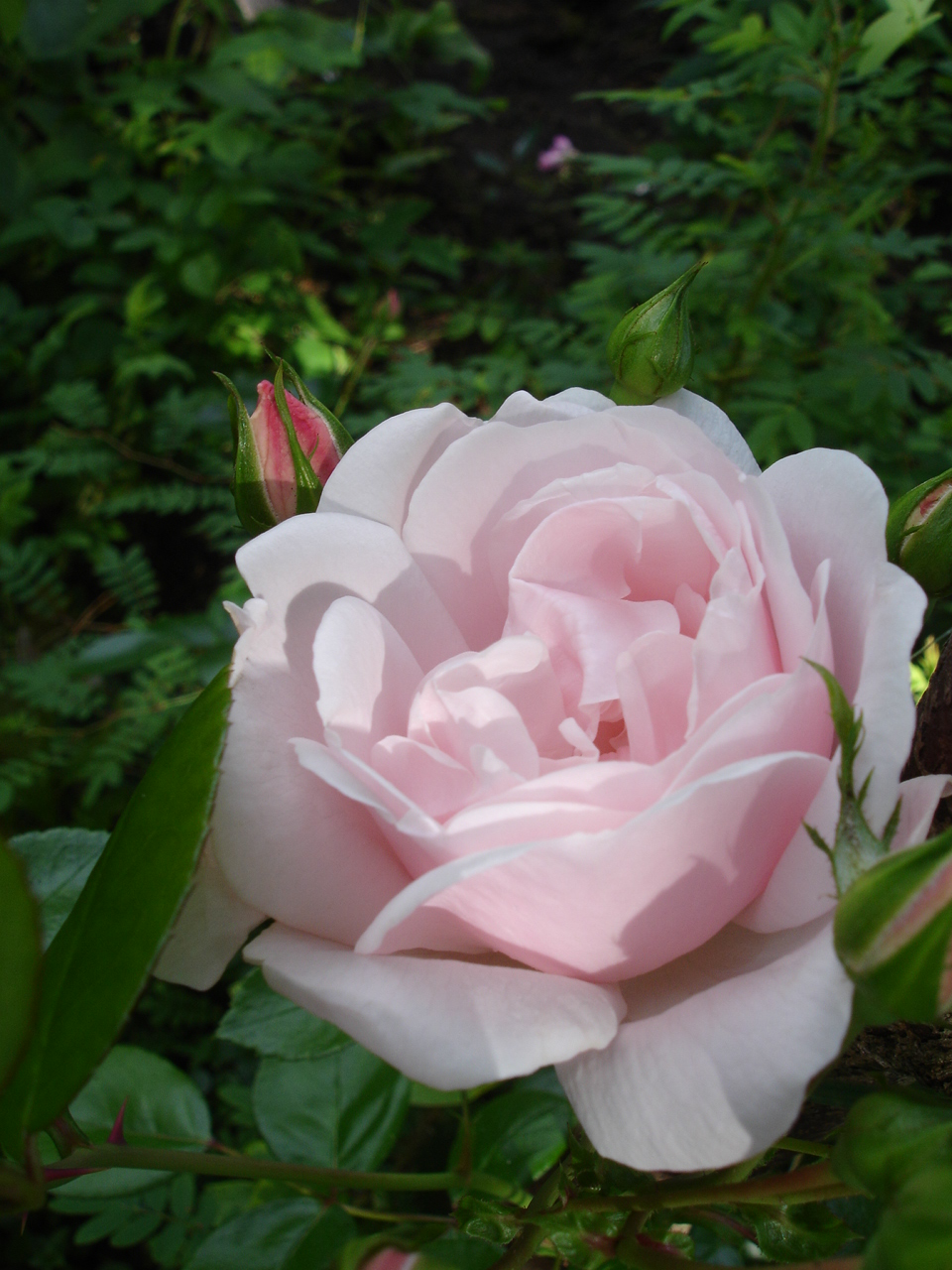

== See also ==
- Garden roses
- List of Award of Garden Merit roses
- All-America Rose Selections
- Portland Gold Medal
- Earth-Kind Rose
- HelpMeFind
