= Rosa 'Tiffany' =

Hybrid tea rose cultivar

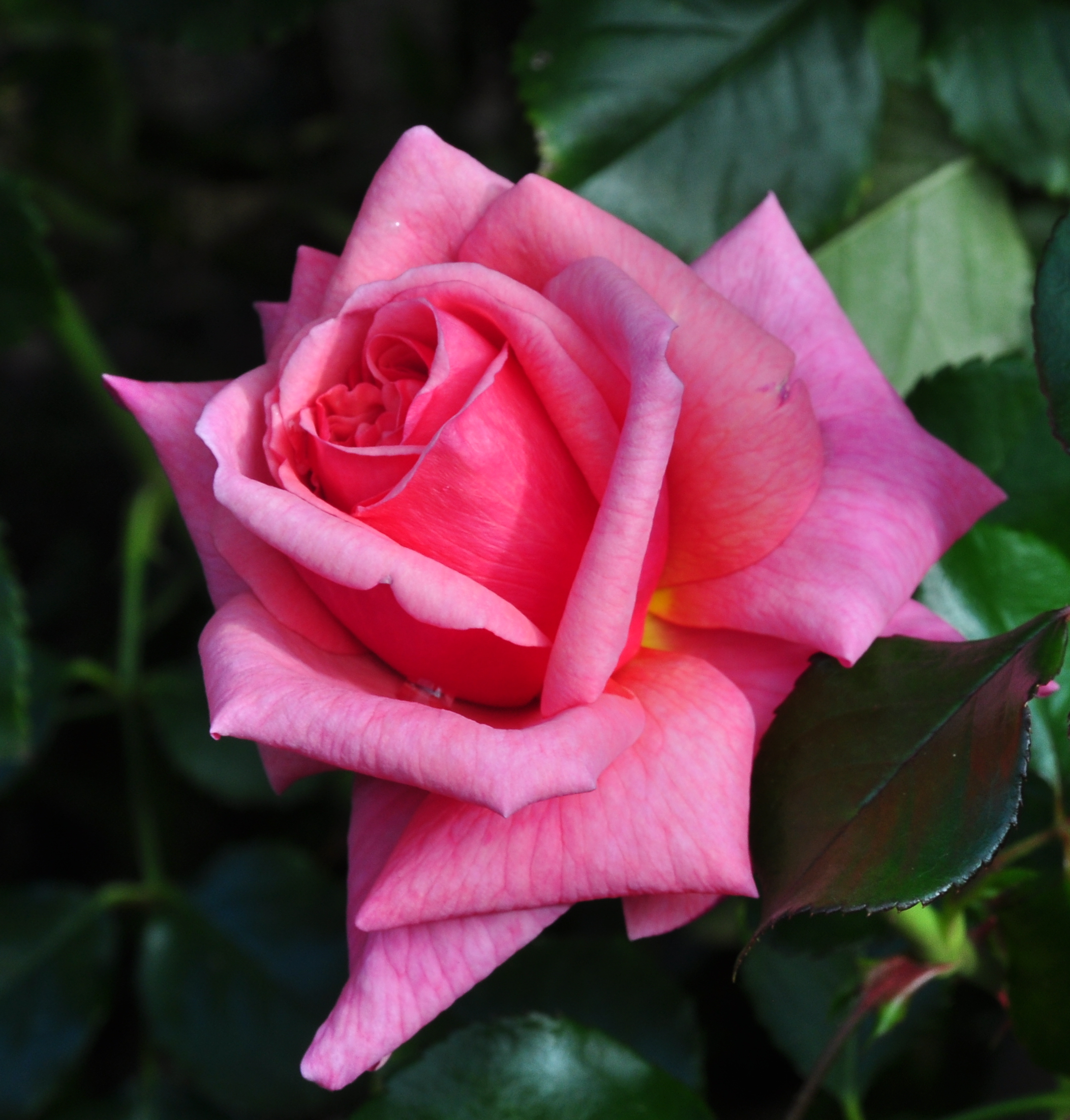
- Rosa 'Tiffany'
- Genus: Rosa hybrid
- Hybrid parentage: 'Charlotte Armstrong' x 'Girona'
- Cultivar group: Hybrid tea
- Breeder: Lindquist
- Origin: United States, 1954

Rosa 'Tiffany' is a hybrid tea rose cultivar, bred by rose grower, Robert Linquist, and introduced into the United States by the Howard Rose Company in 1954. The plant's stock parents are hybrid tea roses, 'Charlotte Armstrong' and 'Girona'. 'Tiffany' was the recipient of the top American rose awards: the Portland Gold Medal in 1954 and the All-America Rose Selections (AARS) in 1955.

== Description ==
'Tiffany' is a medium upright shrub, 3 to 4 ft (90—121 cm) in height with a 2 to 3 ft (60—90 cm) spread. Blooms have an average diameter of 4 to 5 in (10—12 cm) with 25 to 30 petals. Flowers are rose pink with yellow and salmon-pink hues, and a paler pink reverse. Flowers have a strong, fruity fragrance. Blooms are large and have a high-centered, very double bloom form. Flowers are borne mostly solitary or in small clusters of 3 to 4 flowers, with dark green leaves. The plant's long, sturdy stems make it a popular cutting rose. The plant is vigorous, very disease resistant and blooms in flushes from spring through autumn. It thrives in USDA zone 7b through 9b.

== Child plants ==
'Tiffany' was used to hybridize the following plants:

- Rosa 'Granada', (1963)
- Rosa 'Alabama', (1975)
- Rosa 'Sweet Surrender', (1983)
- Rosa 'R.K. Witherspoon' (2005)

== Awards ==
- Portland Gold Medal, (1954)
- All-America Rose Selections (AARS), (1955)
- American Rose Society (ARS) James Gamble Rose Fragrance Award, (1962)

== See also ==
- Garden roses
- Rose Hall of Fame
- All-America Rose Selections
- List of Award of Garden Merit roses
