= Strike It Rich =

Strike It Rich may refer to:

- Strike It Rich (1990 film), a comedy starring Robert Lindsay and Molly Ringwald
- Strike It Rich (1933 film), a comedy directed by Leslie S. Hiscott
- Strike It Rich (1948 film), a comedy starring Rod Cameron and Bonita Granville
- Strike It Rich (1947 game show), a 1947–1958 American game show broadcast on radio and television
- Strike It Rich (1986 game show), a 1986–1987 American show broadcast in television syndication and hosted by Joe Garagiola
- Strike It Lucky, a 1980s and 1990s British game show later known as Strike It Rich
- Alternative title for the 1965 South African film Kimberley Jim
- Rosa 'Strike It Rich', grandiflora rose cultivar
