= Rosa 'Wedding Bells' =

Hybrid tea rose cultivar

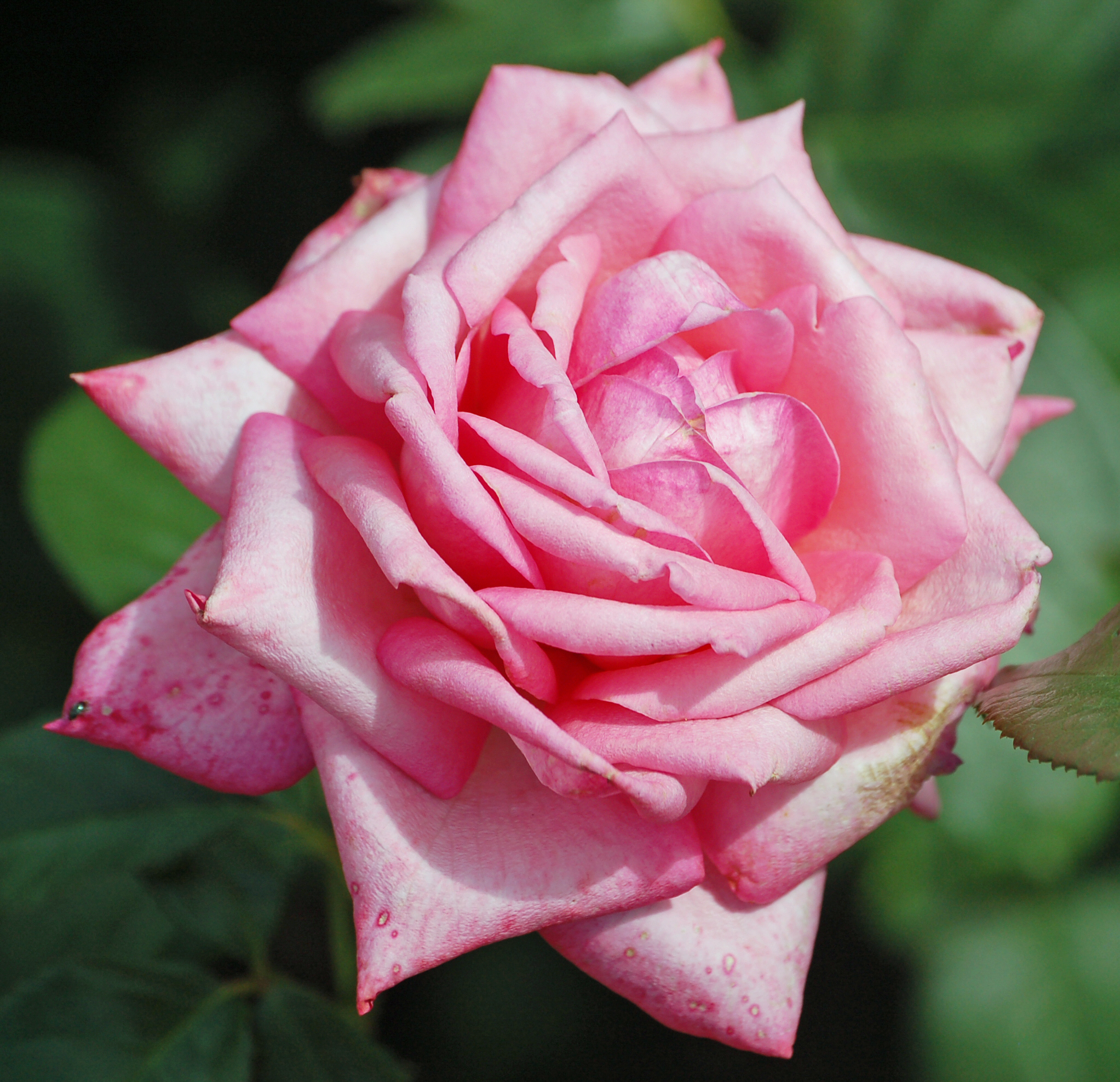
- Rosa 'Wedding Bells'
- Genus: Rosa hybrid
- Hybrid parentage: Unknown parentage
- Cultivar group: Hybrid tea
- Cultivar: KORsteflali
- Breeder: T.H. Kordes
- Origin: Germany, (2001)

Rosa 'Wedding Bells', (a.k.a. KORsteflali ), is a hybrid tea rose cultivar, bred by Tim Hermann Kordes in Germany in 2011. It won the Portland Gold Medal in 2019.

== Description ==
'Wedding Bells' is a medium, upright, bushy shrub, 3 to 4 ft (90—121 cm) in height with a 3 ft (91 cm) spread. Blooms are large, 4—5 in (10—12 cm) in diameter, with over 40 petals. Buds are long, pointed, and ovoid. Flowers have a very full, high-centered bloom form, with over 40 petals. Blooms are borne mostly solitary, and are medium pink in color. The rose has a moderate, old rose fragrance and semi-glossy, dark green foliage. 'Wedding Bells' blooms in flushes throughout its growing season. It is very disease resistant and is recommended for USDA zone 5a and warmer.

== Awards ==
- Portland Gold Medal, (2019)

== See also ==
- Garden roses
- Rose Hall of Fame
- List of Award of Garden Merit roses
