= Rosa 'Over the Moon' =

Hybrid tea rose cultivar

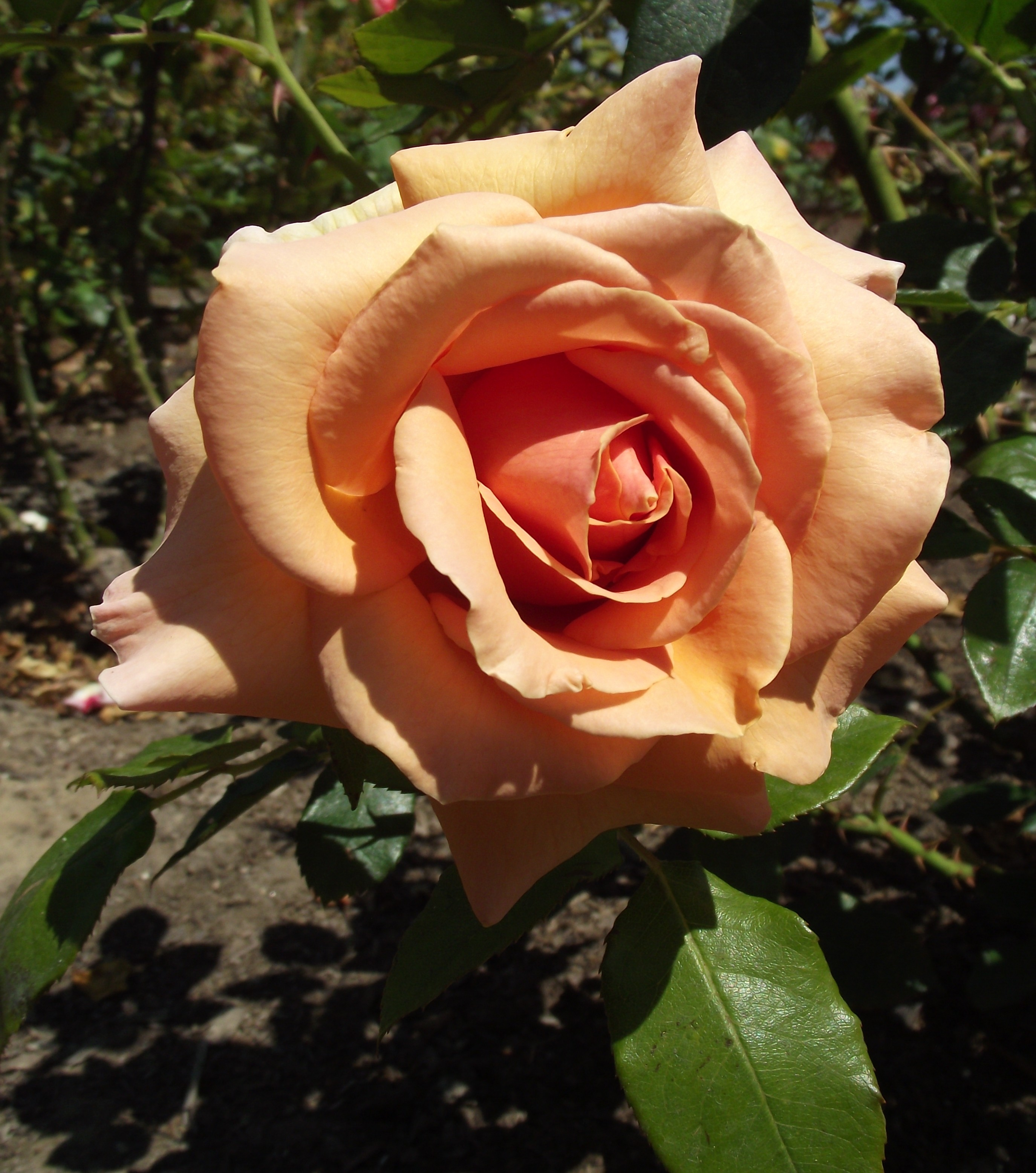
- Rosa 'Over the Moon'
- Genus: Rosa hybrid
- Hybrid parentage: 'Christopher Columbus' x 'Cleopatra'
- Cultivar group: Hybrid tea
- Cultivar: ORAclelon
- Marketing names: 'Over the Moon', 'Over The Moon'
- Breeder: Orard
- Origin: France, (before 2005)

Rosa 'Over the Moon', (aka ORAclelon ), is a hybrid tea rose cultivar, bred by Pierre Orard in France, and introduced into the United States by Weeks Wholesale Rose Growers in 2009. It won the Portland Gold Medal in 2013.

== Description ==
'Over the Moon' is a medium-tall, bushy, upright shrub, 4 to 5 ft (121—152 cm) in height with a 2 to 3 ft (60—91 cm) spread. Blooms are large, 4—5 in (10—12 cm) in diameter, with over 30 petals. Flowers have a very double, high-centered to cupped bloom form and are borne mostly solitary. The flowers are an apricot blend with a yellow reverse. The rose has a mild, apple fragrance and leathery, semi-glossy, medium green foliage. 'Over the Moon' blooms in flushes throughout its growing season. The plant does not do well in warmer climates.

== Awards ==
- Portland Gold Medal, (2013)

== See also ==
- Garden roses
- Rose Hall of Fame
- List of Award of Garden Merit roses
