= Rosa 'Evening Star' =

Floribunda rose cultivar

Rosa 'Handel'
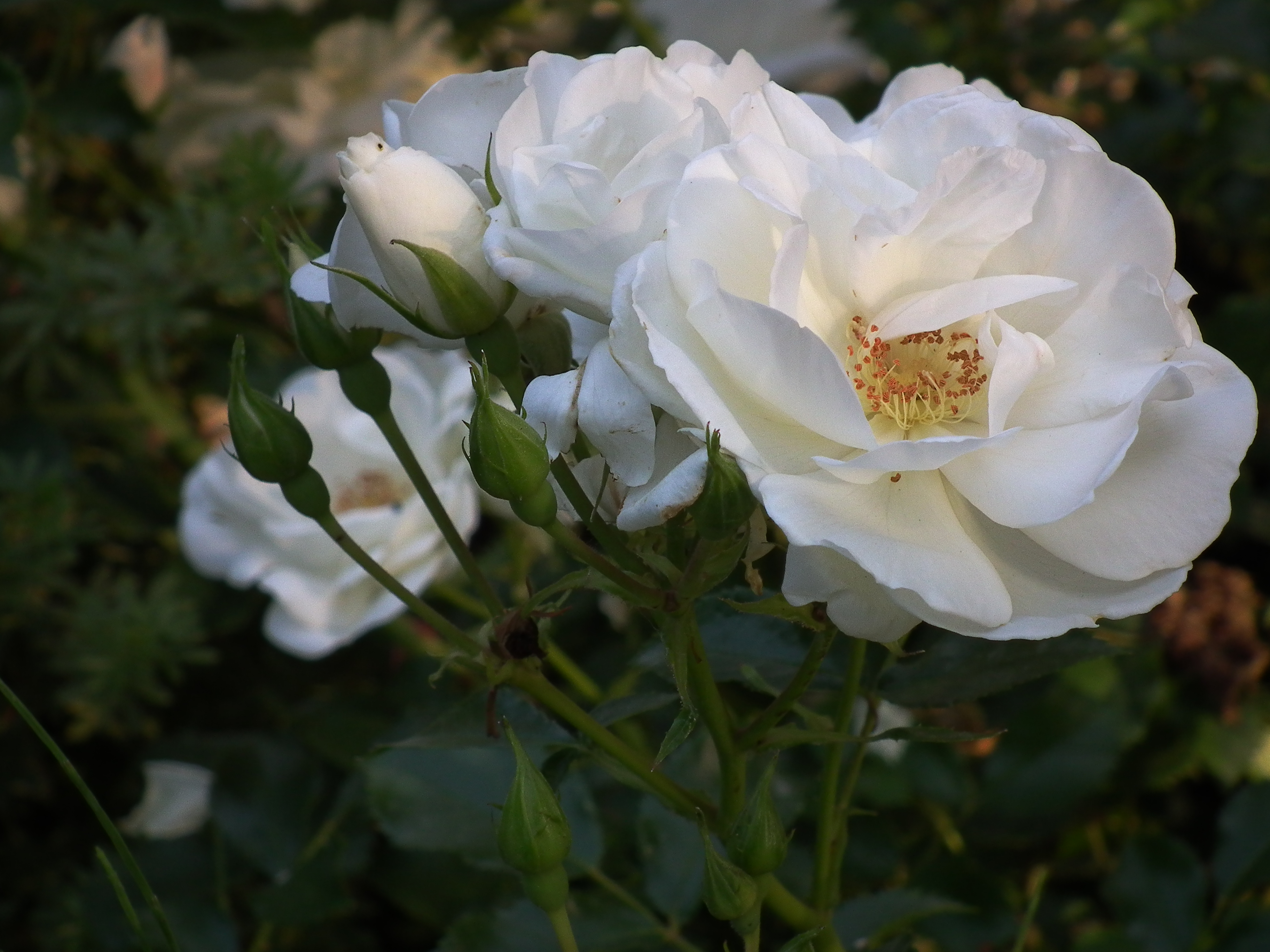
- Rosa 'Evening Star'
- Genus: Rosa hybrid
- Hybrid parentage: 'White Masterpiece' x 'Saratoga'
- Cultivar group: Floribunda
- Cultivar: JACven
- Breeder: Warriner
- Origin: United States, 1974

Rosa 'Evening Star', (a.k.a. JACven ), is a white blend floribunda rose cultivar, developed by William Warriner in 1974, and introduced into the United States by Jackson & Perkins. The stock parents of the plant are hybrid tea, 'White Masterpiece' and floribunda, 'Saratoga'. The cultivar was the recipient of the Portland Gold Medal in 1977.

== Description ==
'Evening Star' is a medium-tall, bushy shrub, 3 to 5 ft (90—152 cm) in height with a 2 to 4 ft (60—121 cm) spread. Blooms are large, with an average diameter of 4—5 in (10—12 cm). Blooms open from large, slender buds and are creamy white with a pale golden center. The rose has a mild fragrance. Flowers have a double (16–25 petals), high-centered, spiral-centered bloom form. Leaves are semi-glossy and dark green. 'Evening Star' blooms in flushes from spring through autumn. The plant does best in USDA zone 6 and warmer.

== Child plants ==
'Handel' was used to hybridize the following plants:

- Rosa 'Alladin's Dream', (before 1995 )
- Rosa 'Audrey Hepburn', (1991)

== Awards ==
- Portland Gold Medal, (1977)

== See also ==
- Garden roses
- Rose Hall of Fame
- All-America Rose Selections
- List of Award of Garden Merit roses
