= Rosa 'Crescendo' =

Hybrid tea rose cultivar

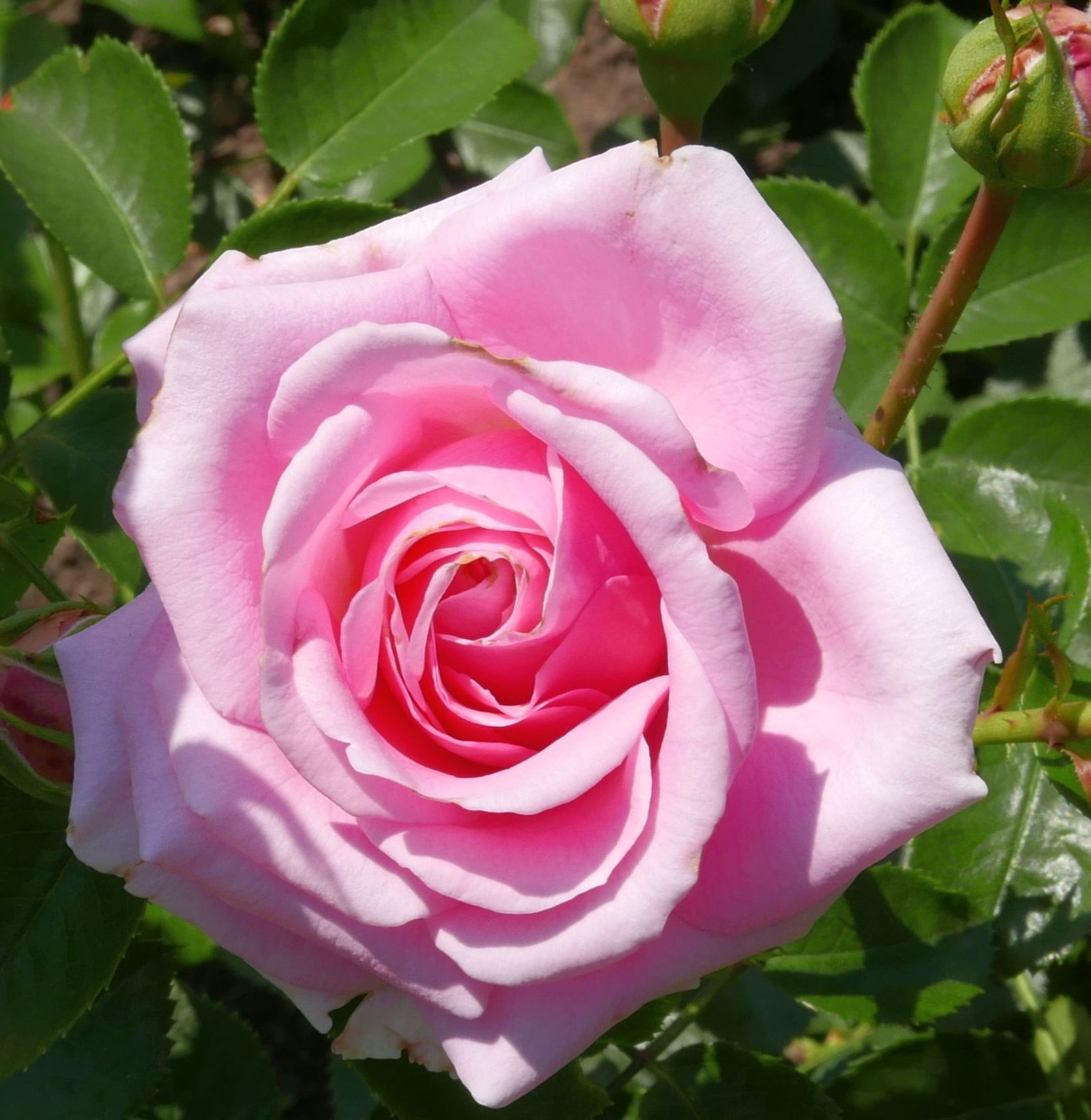
- Rosa 'Crescendo'
- Genus: Rosa hybrid
- Hybrid parentage: 'Gemini' x 'New Zealand
- Cultivar group: Hybrid tea
- Cultivar: JACgemze
- Breeder: Zary
- Origin: United States, (2010)

Rosa 'Crescendo', (a.k.a. JACgemze ), is a pink and white hybrid tea rose cultivar, bred by Dr. Keith Zary in 2010, and introduced in the United States by Jackson & Perkins in 2011. The rose was created from stock parents, Rosa 'Gemini' and Rosa 'New Zealand. 'Crescendo' was awarded the prestigious Portland Gold Medal in 2019.

== Description ==
'Crescendo' is a tall, upright shrub, 5 to 6 ft (152—182 cm) in height with a 3 to 4 ft (90—121 cm) spread. Blooms are large, 4—5 in (10—12 cm) in diameter, with 26 to 40 petals. Buds are pointed and ovoid. Flowers have a very full, high-centered bloom form, and are borne mostly solitary. The flowers are a pink blend, and are generally creamy white with light pink hues, and darker pink edges. The rose has a strong fragrance and large, glossy, dark green foliage. 'Crescendo' blooms in flushes throughout its growing season. The plant is recommended for USDA zone 5 and warmer.

== Awards ==
- Portland Gold Medal, (2019)

== See also ==
- Garden roses
- Rose Hall of Fame
- List of Award of Garden Merit roses
