= Rosa 'Sunny Sky' =

Hybrid tea rose cultivar

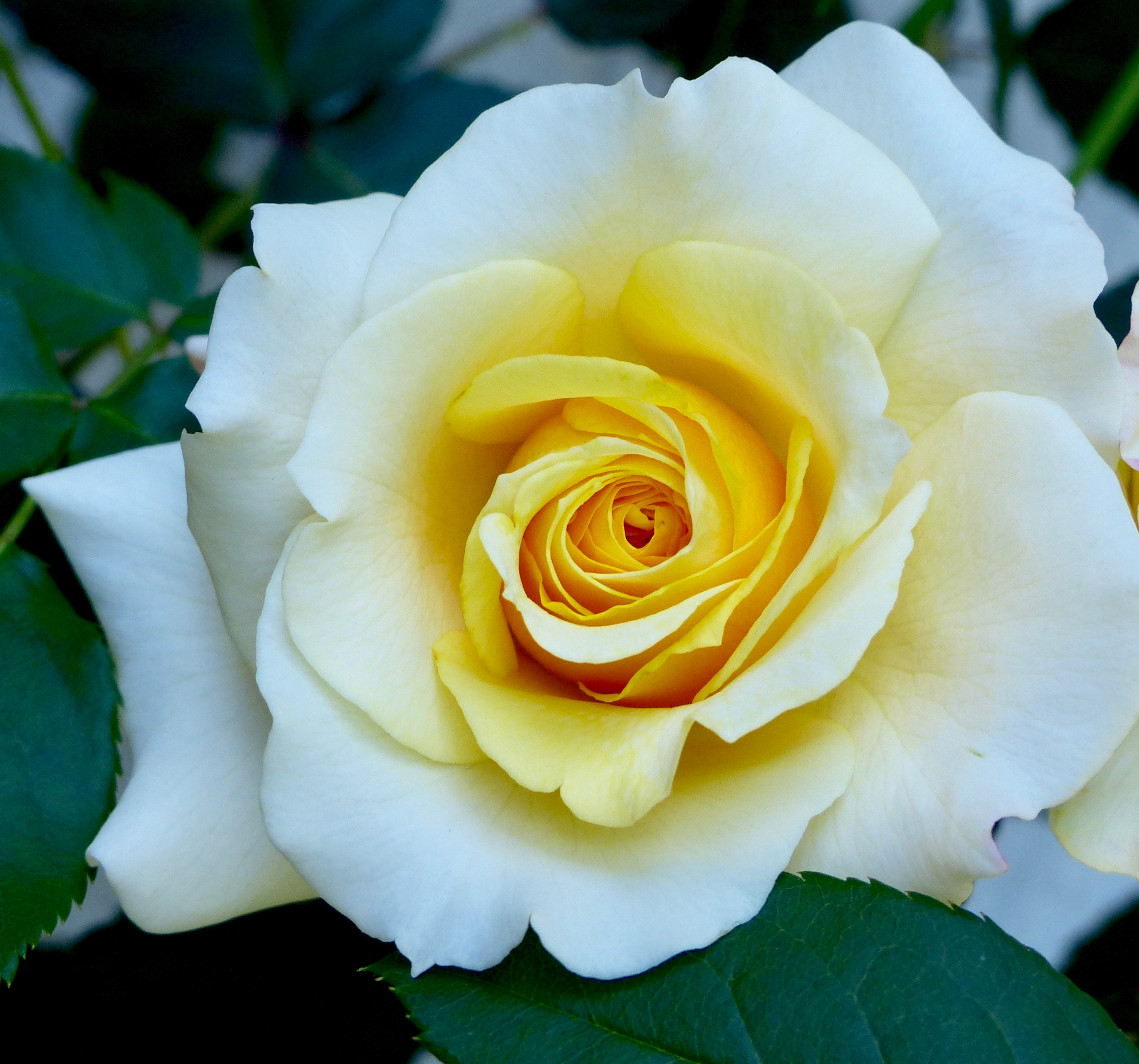
- Rosa 'Sunny Sky'
- Genus: Rosa hybrid
- Cultivar group: Hybrid tea
- Cultivar: KORvestavi
- Breeder: Kordes
- Origin: Germany, (1999)

Rosa 'Sunny Sky', (aka KORvestavi ), is a hybrid tea rose cultivar, bred by Tim Hermann Kordes in Germany in 1999. It was named an ADR rose award winner in 2015 and was awarded the Portland Gold Medal in 2017.

== Description ==
'Sunny Sky' is a medium, bushy, upright shrub, 3 to 4 ft (90—121 cm) in height with a 2 ft (60 cm) spread. Blooms are large, 4—5 in (10—12 cm) in diameter. Buds are long and pointed. Blooms have a double (17-25 petals) high-centered form. They are borne mostly solitary and in small clusters. The flowers are yellow in color with a dark yellow center. The rose has a mild, fruity fragrance and glossy, medium green foliage. 'Sunny Sky' blooms in flushes throughout its growing season. The plant does well in USDA zone 6 and warmer.

== Awards ==
- ADR rose award (2015)
- Portland Gold Medal (2017)

== See also ==
- Garden roses
- Rose Hall of Fame
- List of Award of Garden Merit roses
