= Rosa 'Love' =

Grandiflora rose cultivar

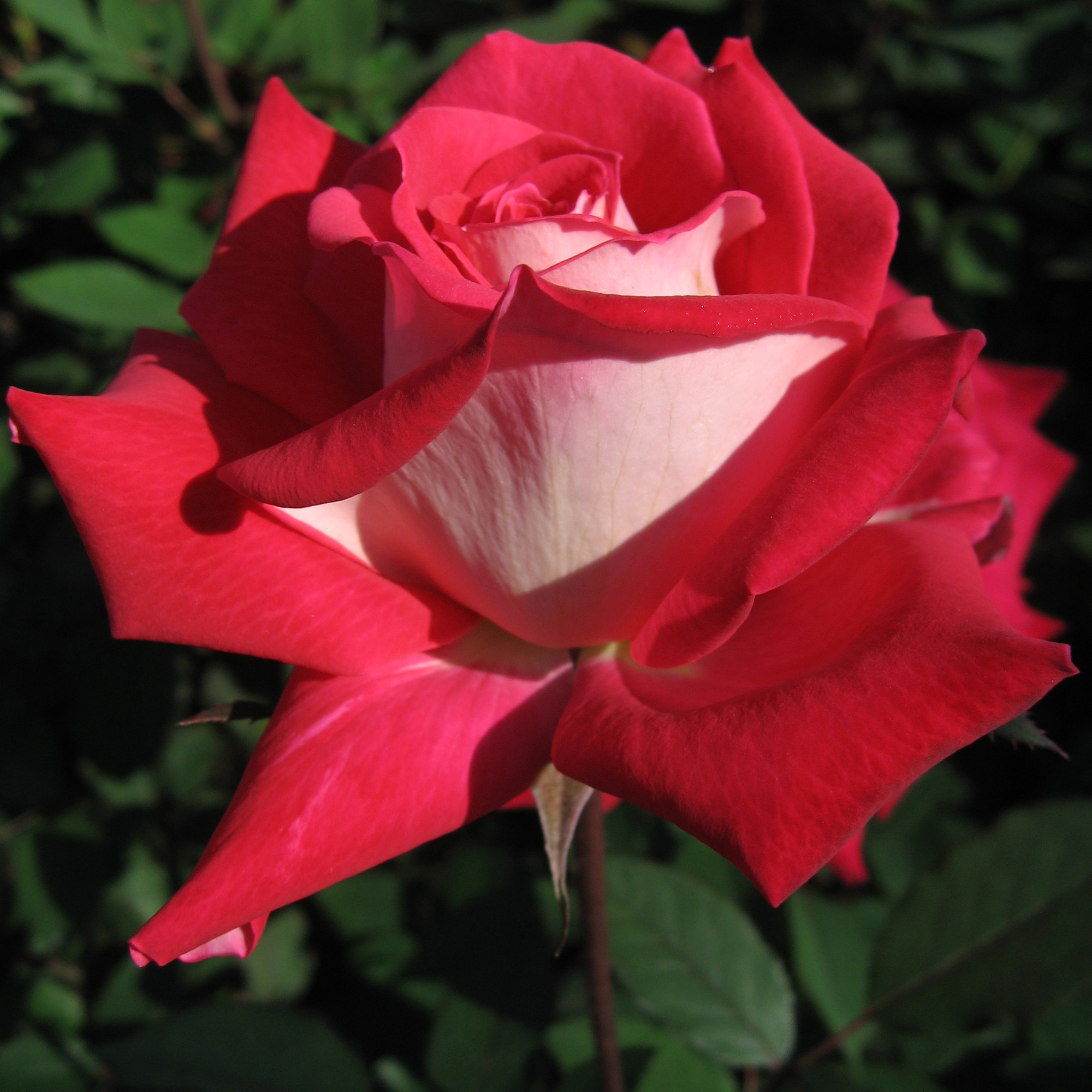
- Rosa 'Love'
- Genus: Rosa hybrid
- Hybrid parentage: 'Unnamed seedling' x 'Redgold'
- Cultivar group: Grandiflora
- Cultivar: JACtwin
- Breeder: Warriner
- Origin: United States, 1980

Rosa 'Love', (aka JACtwin ), is a grandiflora rose cultivar, developed by William Warriner, and introduced into the United States by Jackson & Perkins in 1980. The cultivar was the recipient of the Portland Gold Medal and was named an All-America Rose Selections winner in 1980.

== Description ==
'Love' is a medium-tall, upright shrub, 5 to 6 ft (152—182 cm) in height with a 2 to 3 ft (60—91 cm) spread. Blooms are large, with an average diameter of 4—5 in (10—12 cm), with 30 to 35 petals. Flowers are a scarlet red with a silvery white reverse. The rose has a mild fragrance. Blooms have a high-centered, relaxed bloom form, and are borne mostly solitary on long, upright stems, in small clusters. Leaves are large, glossy, leathery, and dark green. 'Love' blooms continuously from spring through autumn. The plant does best in USDA zone 6b and warmer.

== Child plants ==
'Love' was used to hybridize the following plants:

- Rosa 'Delany Sisters', (1997)
- Rosa 'Fire 'n' Ice', (1987)

== Awards ==
- Portland Gold Medal, (1980)
- All-America Rose Selections (AARS), (1980)

== See also ==
- Garden roses
- Rose Hall of Fame
- List of Award of Garden Merit roses
