= Rosa 'Miss All-American Beauty' =

Hybrid tea rose cultivar

Rosa 'Spartan'
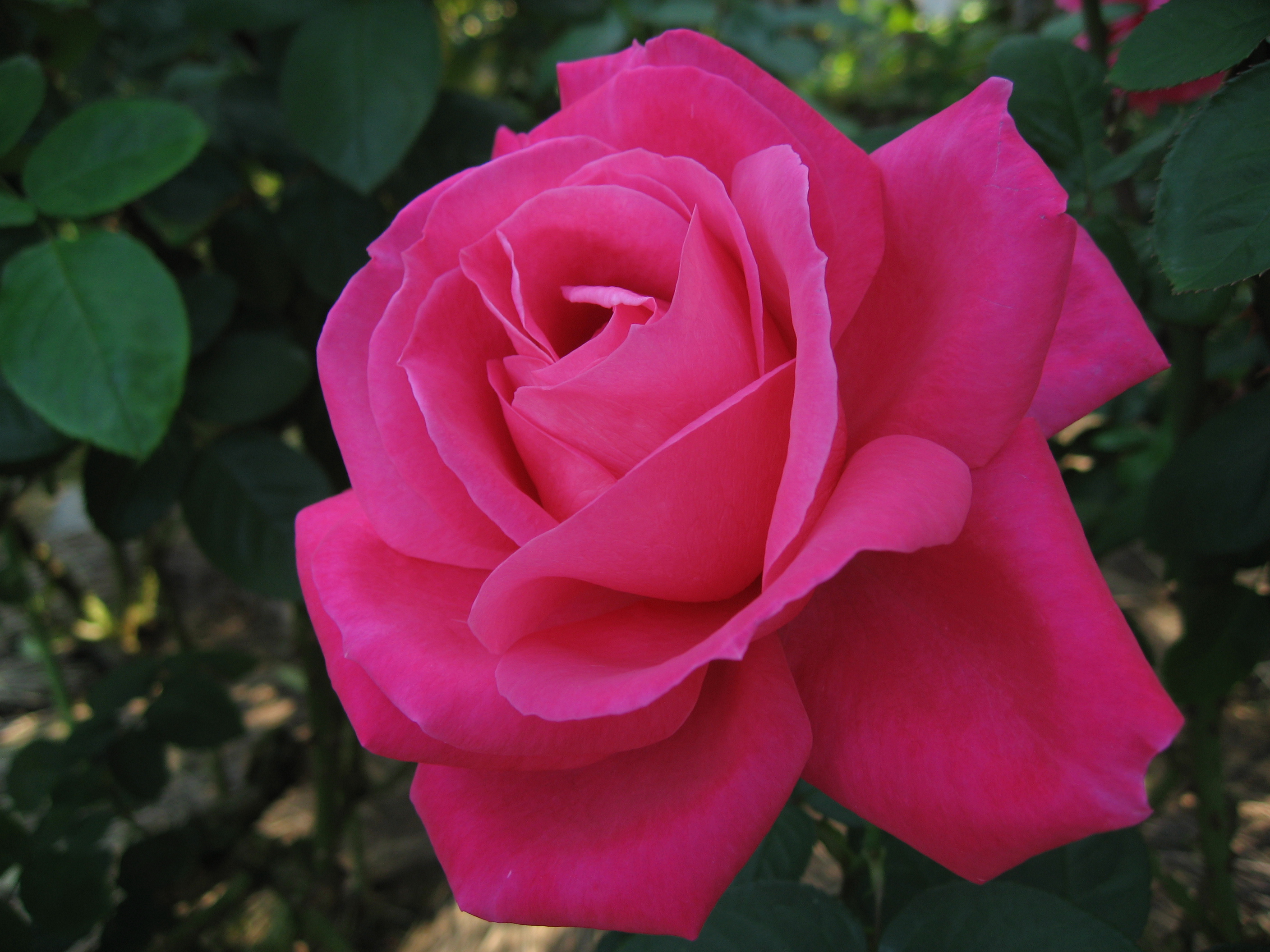
- Rosa 'Miss All-American Beauty'
- Genus: Rosa hybrid
- Hybrid parentage: 'Chrysler Imperial' x 'Karl Herbst'
- Cultivar group: Hybrid tea
- Cultivar: MEIdaud
- Marketing names: 'Miss All-American Beauty', 'Maria Callas'
- Breeder: Meilland
- Origin: United States, 1965

Rosa 'Miss All-American Beauty', (aka MEIdaud ), is a hybrid tea rose cultivar, developed by Marie-Louise Meilland in 1965. The cultivar was the recipient of the Portland Gold Medal in 1966 and named an All-America Rose Selections winner in 1968.

== Description ==
'Miss All-American Beauty' is a tall, bushy, upright shrub, 4 to 7 ft (121—213 cm) in height with a 2 to 3 ft (60—90 cm) spread. Blooms are very large, with an average diameter of 6 in (15.24 cm), with 26 to 40 petals. Flowers are a bright pink, with little fading as the blooms age, but will burn in the sun. The rose has a strong, sweet fragrance. Blooms open from large, ovoid buds, are high-centered, borne mostly solitary, and have a cupped bloom form. The plant is very prickly and has large, leathery, and dark green leaves that do poorly in dry climates. 'Miss All-American Beauty' blooms in flushes from spring through autumn. The plant does best in USDA zone 7 and warmer.

== Awards ==
- Portland Gold Medal, (1966)
- All-America Rose Selections, (1968)

== See also ==
- Garden roses
- Rose Hall of Fame
- All-America Rose Selections
- List of Award of Garden Merit roses
