= Rosa 'Margaret Merril' =

White-blend Floribunda rose cultivar

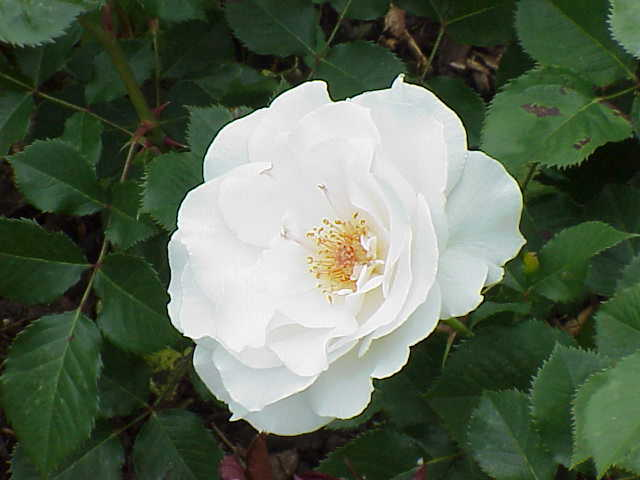
- Rosa 'Margaret Merril'
- Genus: Rosa hybrid
- Hybrid parentage: ('Rudolph Timm' x 'Dedication') x 'Pascali'
- Cultivar group: Floribunda
- Cultivar: HARkuly
- Breeder: Jack Harkness
- Origin: Great Britain, 1978

Rosa 'Margaret Merril' (aka HARkuly) is a white-blend Floribunda rose cultivar developed by Harkness Roses in 1972 and introduced into Great Britain in 1978. It is the winner of multiple rose awards, including the Geneva Gold Medal and Rome Gold Medal and the Hague and Auckland Fragrance awards.

== Description ==
'Margaret Merril' is a vigorous, tall upright rose, 3 to 5 ft (0.91–1.52 m) in height with a 2 to 3 ft (0.61–0.91 m) spread. Blooms are medium-sized, have an average diameter of 3.9 in (99 mm), and a semi-double, cupped, high-centered bloom form. Bloom color is a blend of white and pink with a pink center. The flowers are light pink in cool weather and white in hot climates. They have a very strong spicy, citrus fragrance. Flowers are carried singly early in the season and in larger clusters later in the season, and will bloom well into autumn.

'Margaret Merril' blooms in flushes throughout the growing season. It is susceptible to blackspot. Leaves are healthy, dark green and glossy. It will grow up to 8.2 ft (2.5 m) hot climates. 'Margaret Merril' was used to hybridize six child plants: 'Princess Alexandra' (1988), 'Carpet White' (1991), 'Victorian Spice' (1994) 'Mon Jardin et Ma Maison' (1998), 'Petticoat' (2004), and 'Rayon de Soleil' (2014).

== History ==
=== Harkness Roses ===
The rose cultivar was developed by Harkness Roses (R. Harkness & Co. Ltd) at Hitchin, Hertfordshire. The acclaimed nursery, which continues to sell roses today, was established in 1879 in Bedale, Yorkshire by brothers, John Harkness (1857–1933) and (Robert Harkness (1851–1920). Jack Harkness (1918–1994) is the grandson of the original co-founder John Harkness. The Harkness family nursery grew roses from the beginning, but did not breed roses until 1962, when Jack Harkness began managing the business.

=== 'Margaret Merril' ===
Harkness developed the rose cultivar by crossing ('Rudolph Timm' x 'Dedication') x 'Pascali' in 1972. Harkness Roses introduced 'Margaret Merril' into Britain in 1978. It is a very popular rose worldwide. 'Margaret Merril' has won multiple rose awards, including the Geneva Gold Medal and Rome Gold Medal in 1978, The Hague Fragrance Award in 1987, the James Mason Gold Medal in 1990, and the Auckland Fragrance Award in 1992.
