= Rosa 'Sally Holmes' =

Rose cultivar

Rosa 'Sally Holmes
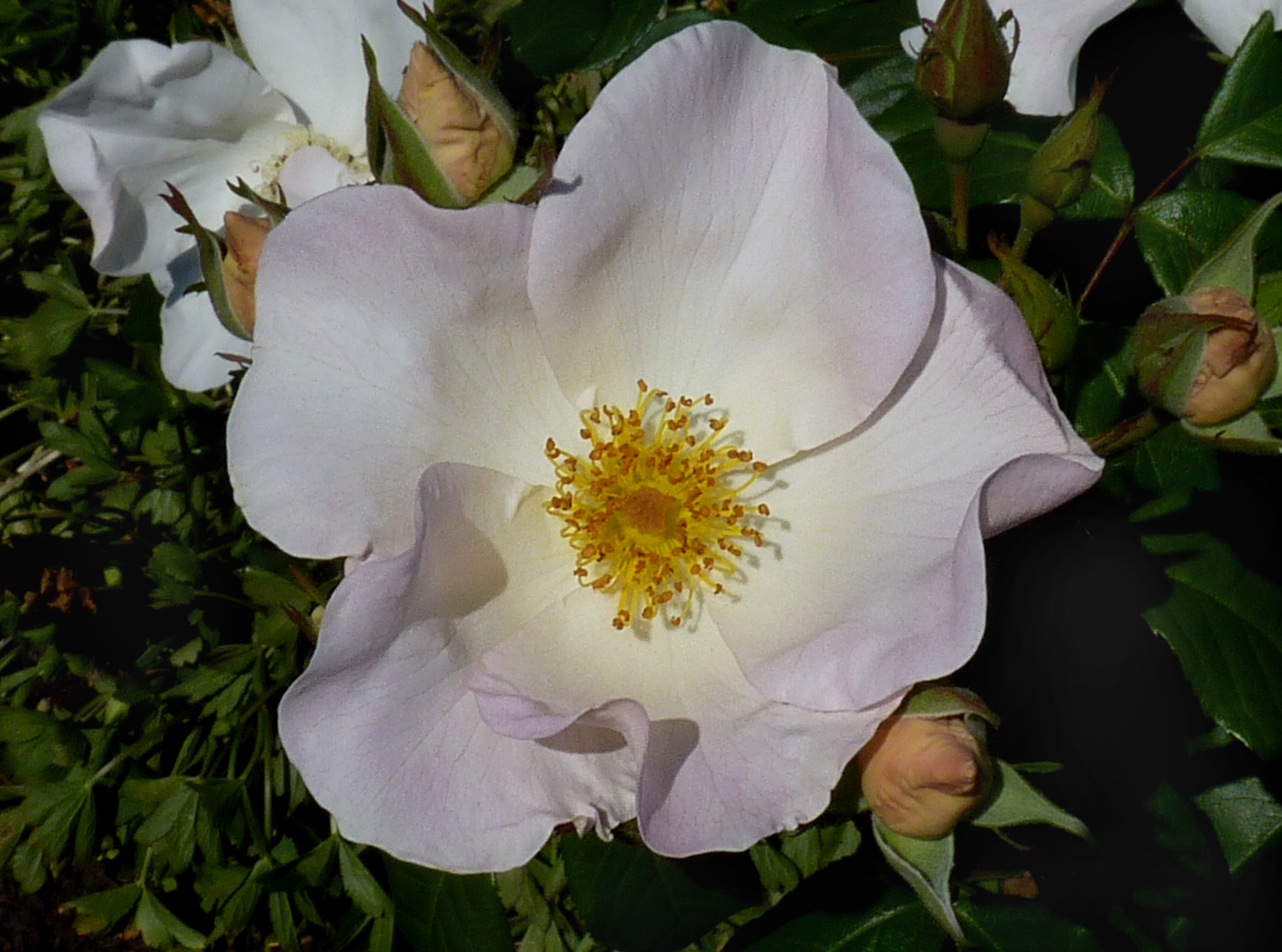
- Rosa 'Sally Holmes'
- Genus: Rosa hybrid
- Hybrid parentage: 'Ivory Fashion' x 'Ballerina'
- Cultivar group: Shrub rose
- Breeder: Holmes
- Origin: Great Britain, 1976

Rosa 'Sally Holmes' is a white shrub rose cultivar, bred by Robert Holmes in Great Britain in 1976, and named in honor of his wife, Sally. It was created from stock parents, Rosa 'Ivory Fashion' and Rosa 'Ballerina'. 'Sally Holmes' has won numerous awards, including the Portland Gold Medal in 1993, and induction into the Rose Hall of Fame as "World's Favourite Rose" in 2012.

== Description ==
'Sally Holmes' is a tall, bushy shrub, 6 to 12 ft (185–365 cm) in height with a 4 to 6 ft (121–182 cm) spread. It can be grown as a climber, but needs to be staked in windy locations. Blooms are large, 4–5 in (10–12 cm) in diameter, and have a single petal form with 4-8 petals. Flowers are borne in long-stemmed, large clusters (10–40). The flowers are initially cream with pink hues, and yellow stamens, eventually turning white as the stamens drop off. Flowers last a long time in rain and hot weather. The rose has a mild, musky fragrance and glossy, dark green foliage. 'Sally Holmes' blooms in flushes throughout its growing season. The plant does best in hot climates, but can be grown in USDA zone 5b through 9b. It is disease resistant, but is prone to blackspot.

== Awards ==
- Monza Gold Medal, (1979)
- Baden-Baden Gold Medal, (1980)
- Portland Gold Medal, (1993)
- Rose Hall of Fame, (2012)

== See also ==
- Garden roses
- Rose Hall of Fame
- List of Award of Garden Merit roses
