= Rosa 'Fragrant Cloud' =

Hybrid tea rose cultivar

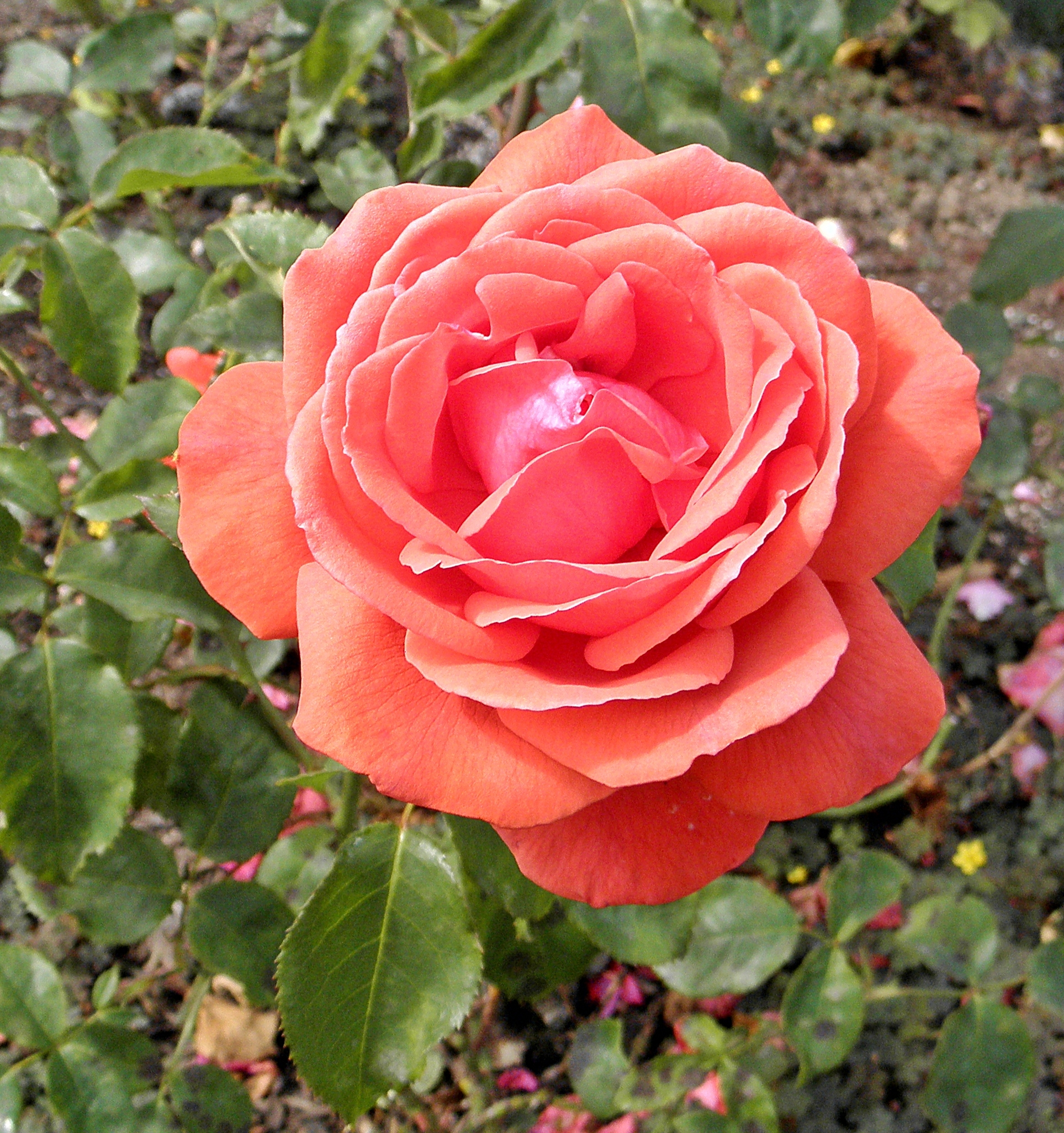
- Rosa 'Fragrant Cloud'
- Genus: Rosa hybrid
- Hybrid parentage: 'Prima Ballerina' x 'Montezuma'
- Cultivar group: Hybrid tea
- Cultivar: TANellis
- Marketing names: 'Fragrant Cloud' 'Nuage Parfumé ®' 'Duftwolke ®'
- Breeder: Mathias Tantau, Jr.
- Origin: Germany, 1963

Rosa 'Fragrant Cloud', (aka TANellis ), is a hybrid tea rose cultivar, bred by Mathias Tantau, Jr. in Germany in 1963. The plant was created from stock parents, Rosa 'Prima Ballerina' and Rosa 'Monteauma'. 'Fragrant Cloud' has won multiple awards, including the Portland Gold Medal in 1966, the James Gamble Fragrance award in 1970, and induction into the Rose Hall of Fame as "World's Favourite Rose" in 1981.

== Description ==
'Fragrant Cloud' is a medium-tall, upright shrub, 3 to 7 ft (91–152 cm) in height with a 3 to 4 ft (90–121 cm) spread. Blooms are very large,6 in (15 cm) in diameter, with a high centered, full bloom form with 26 to 40 petals. Flowers are borne singly on short stems or in small clusters of 3–7. The flowers are a bright orange-coral, and take on an unusual purplish hue as they mature. The rose has a strong, citrus, damask fragrance; large, dark green foliage; and is very prickly. Fragrant Cloud' blooms in flushes throughout its growing season. The plant does well in USDA zone 7 and warmer.

== Child plants ==
'Fragrant Cloud' was used to hybridize the following plants:

- Rosa 'Alec's Red'
- Rosa 'Bengal Tiger'
- Rosa 'Boogie Woogie'
- "Rosa" 'Dolly Parton'
- Rosa 'Folklore'
- Rosa 'Forgotten Dreams'
- Rosa 'Friendship'
- Rosa 'Gitte
- Rosa 'Harmonie'
- Rosa 'Just Joey'
- Rosa 'Kleopatra'
- Rosa 'Rose Rhapsody'
- Rosa 'Tenerife'
- Rosa 'Typhoo Tea'
- Rosa 'Velvet Fragrance'

== Awards ==
- Royal National Rose Society (RNRS), President's International Trophy (PIT), (1964)
- Portland Gold Medal, (1966)
- James Gamble Fragrance award, (1970)
- Rose Hall of Fame, (1981)

== See also ==
- Garden roses
- All-America Rose Selections
- List of Award of Garden Merit roses
