= Rosa 'Ingrid Bergman' =

Rose cultivar

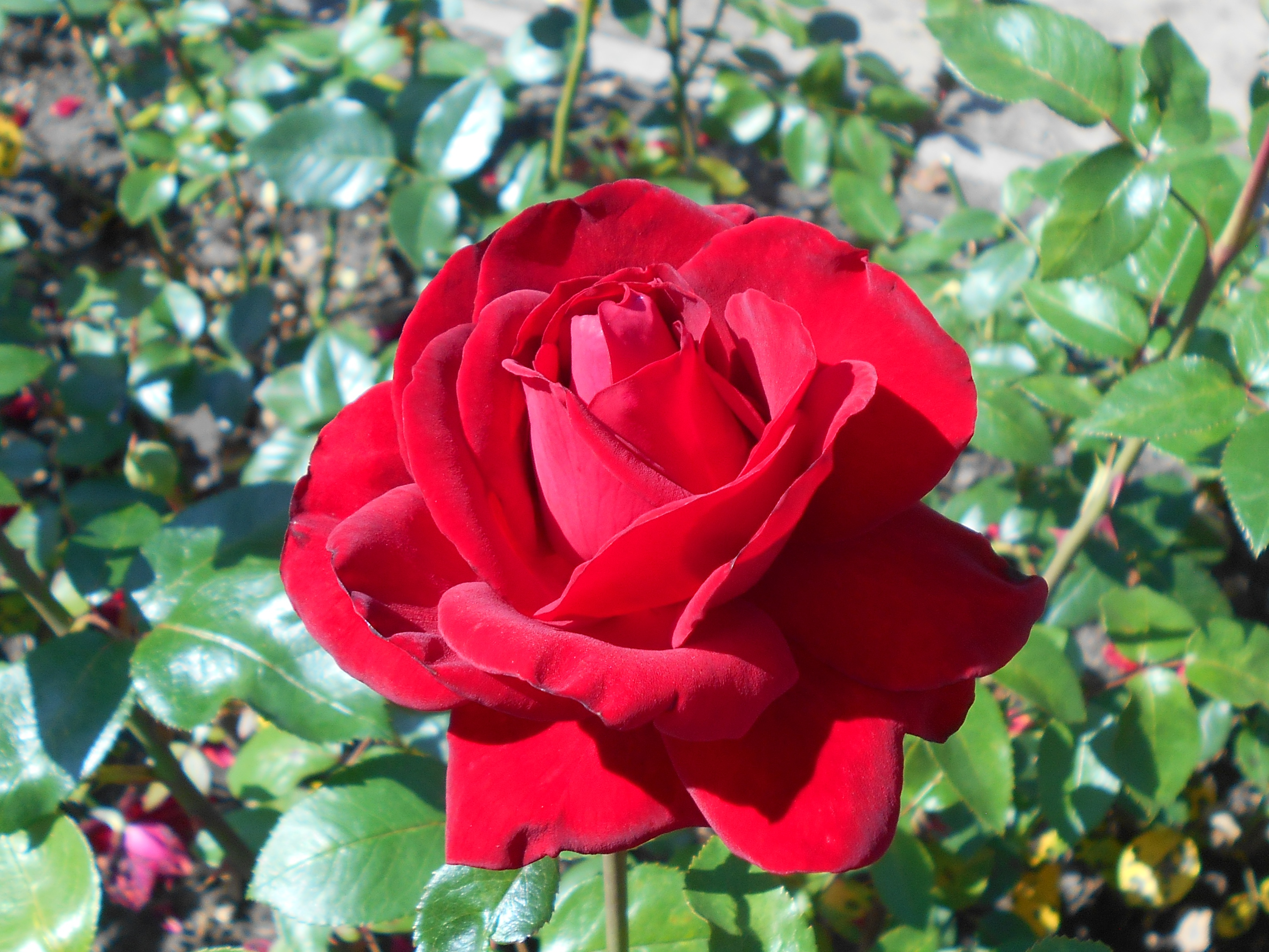
- Genus: Rosa hybrid
- Hybrid parentage: 'Precious Platinum' × Seedling
- Cultivar group: Hybrid Tea
- Cultivar: Ingrid Bergman
- Origin: Poulsen 1984 (Fredensborg, Denmark)

Rosa 'Ingrid Bergman' is a red hybrid tea rose, bred by the Danish rose growers Pernille and Mogens Olesen and introduced by their company Poulsen Roser in 1984. It is a cross between the red hybrid tea 'Precious Platinum' (Dickson 1974) and an unnamed seedling. It was named in honor of the Swedish actress Ingrid Bergman (1915–1982).

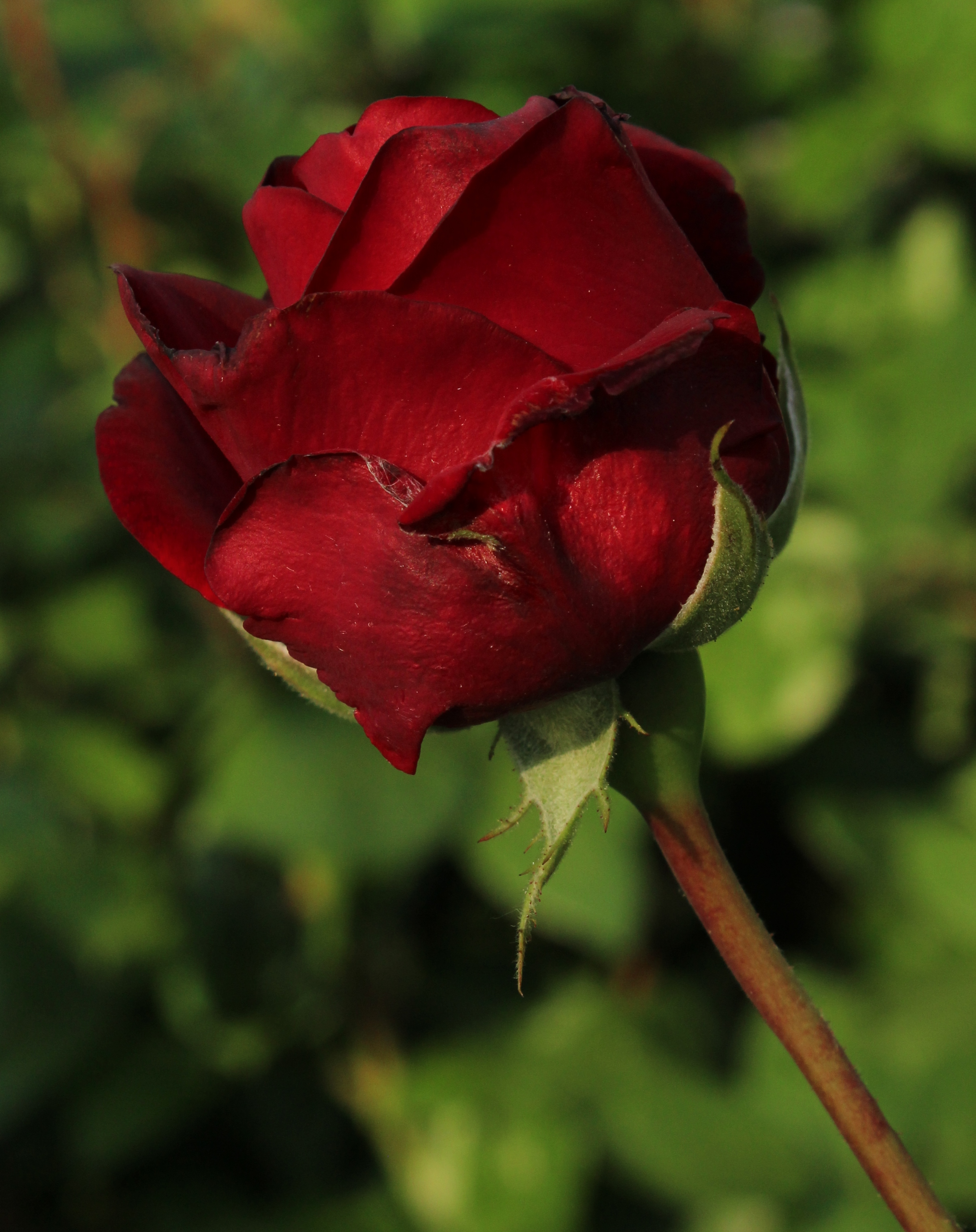
'Ingrid Bergman' bud

== Description ==
'Ingrid Bergman' has very large, moderately fragrant flowers with up to 10 centimetres (3.9 in) diameter. Their colour is a warm, velvety, dark red, described as currant to cardinal red. The well-formed flowers have a full, high-centered form and 26 to 40 petals. They appear solitary or in clusters on long stems from June to September, and are long lasting on the plant and as cut flowers, making it well liked by gardeners and florists.

The shrubs are upright, reaching a height of 60 to 100 centimetres (24 to 39 in), and a width of 60 to 65 centimetres (24 to 26 in). The medium-sized dark green foliage is semi-glossy and normally healthy. The cultivar is heat and rain tolerant, very winter hardy down to −30 °C (USDA 4b), and very disease resistant. 'Ingrid Bergman' can also be grown in containers.

== Awards ==
The cultivar was granted several awards, including the Award of Garden Merit by the Royal Horticultural Society (1993), the Golden Rose of The Hague (1987) and gold medals at rose trials in Belfast (1985), Copenhagen (1986), and Madrid (1986), bearing witness to its good qualities its tolerance of different climates.

Finally, it was selected as "World Favourite Rose" in 2000 by the World Federation of Rose Societies and is listed in their Rose Hall of Fame.
