= Rosa 'Knock Out' =

Shrub rose cultivar

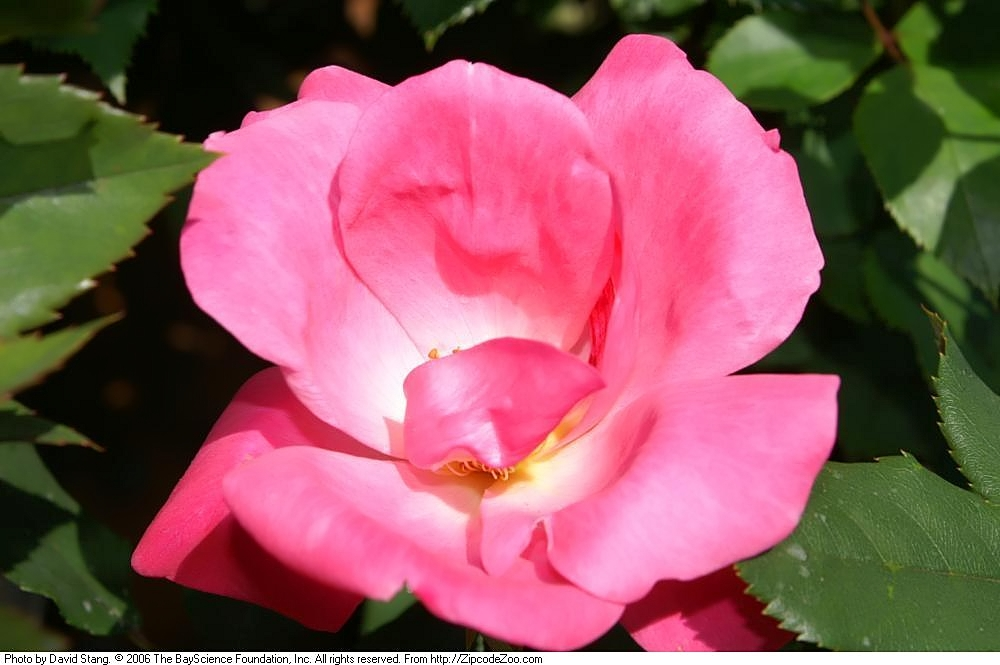
- Rosa 'Knock Out'
- Genus: Rosa hybrid
- Hybrid parentage: 'RAD85-139.1' x 'RAD84-196.8'
- Cultivar group: Shrub Rose
- Cultivar: RADrazz
- Marketing names: 'Knock Out', 'Purple Meidiland'
- Origin: United States, 1989

Rosa 'Knock Out', (aka RADrazz), is a shrub rose cultivar bred by American rose grower William Radler in 1989 and introduced into the United States by Star Roses and Plants in 2000. It was named an All-America Rose Selections winner in 2000.

== History ==
'Knock Out' was developed by amateur rose breeder William Radler in his Milwaukee, Wisconsin basement in 1989. The cultivar was developed from a cross between two unpatented, unnamed seedlings bred by Radler himself. The seed parent, with code RAD85-139.1, came from the open pollination of a seedling with parentage {Carefree Beauty x [(Tampico x Applejack) x Playboy]} x {Carefree Beauty x [(Tampico x Applejack) x Playboy]}. The pollen parent, code RAD84-196.8, had as parentage Razzle Dazzle x [Deep purple x (Fabergé x Eddie's Crimson)] Compared to the other new hybrid rose plants in his backyard test garden that year, Radler recalled that new cultivar was exceptional. "The rose was special, a dense bush full of pinkish-red blooms. No need to prune. Dead flowers just fell off. No need to spray. The rose appeared immune to diseases such as black spot mildew".

"'Many people consider 'Knock Out' a good example of the type of rose that will be most popular in the future. It is a landscaping or shrub rose in the Floribunda style, but totally disease-free, drought-tolerant, extremely hardy and amazingly floriferous."

— Quest-Ritson, 2011.

Radler was able to work with the wholesale nursery, Star Roses and Plants, to help develop and test the new rose cultivar. After eight years of testing, Star Roses introduced the new rose into the United States in 2000 under the marketing name of 'Knock Out'. The extremely hardy rose cultivar was successful that first year, and has become one of America's top selling roses. 'Knock Out' is also the original rose variety of a large family of 'Knock Out rose varieties.

== Description ==
'Knock Out' is a medium, bushy shrub, 2 to 4 ft (60–121 cm) in height with a 3 to 4 ft (90–120 cm) spread. Blooms are 2—3 in (5–7 cm) in diameter, saucer-shaped, with single to semi-double (5—13) petals. Flowers open from attractive buds, and are a bright cherry red with a white center and green-yellow stamens. Flowers have a strong, fruity fragrance, and bloom in flushes from spring through fall. 'Knock Out' is disease resistant and black spot resistant, but is susceptible to mildew. The shrub has glossy, dark green foliage. New stems and growth are purple. The plant thrives in USDA zones 4 and warmer.

== Sports and related varieties ==
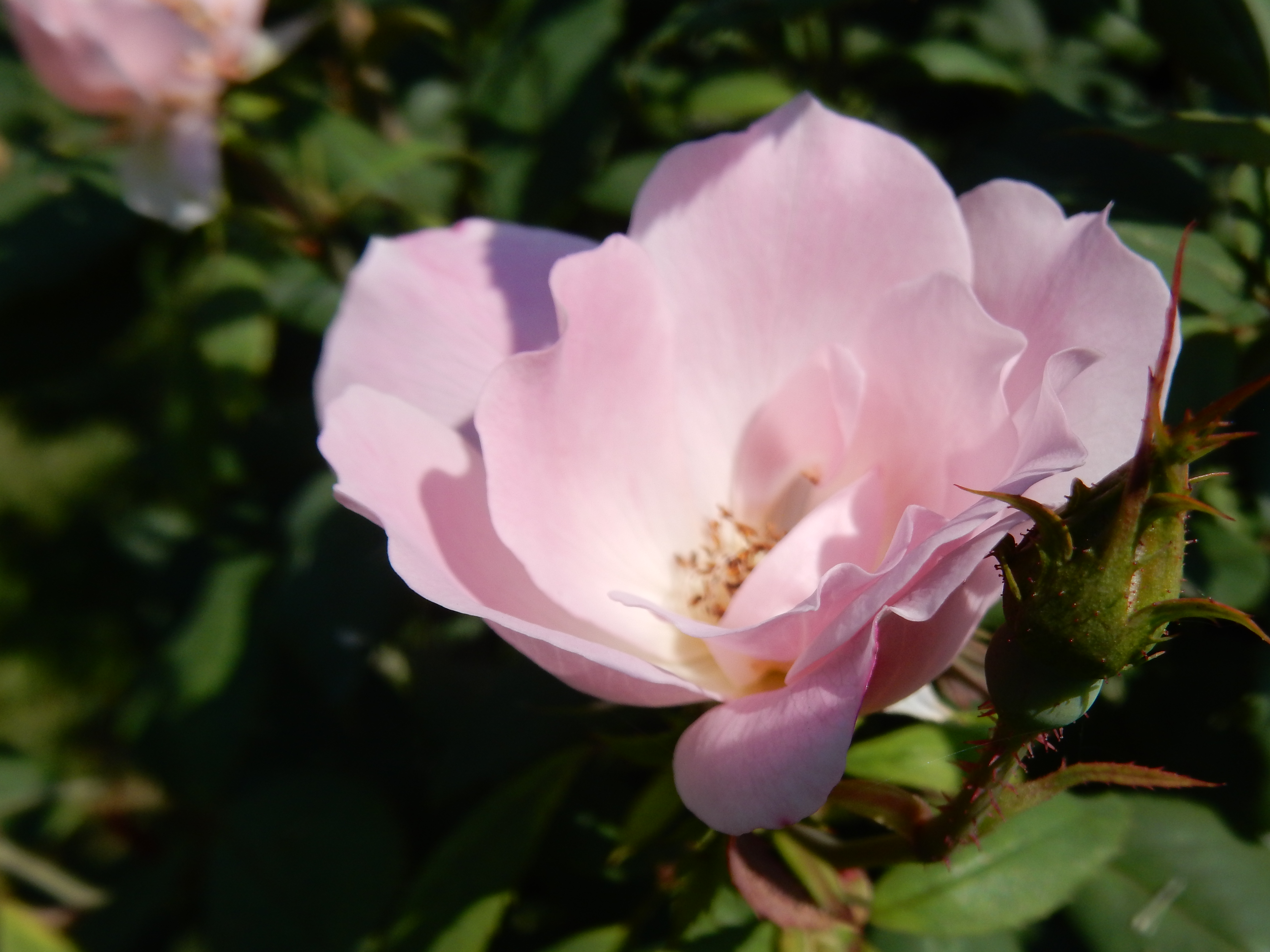
Rosa 'Blushing Knock Out'

- 'Double Knock Out', seedling from the same cross
- 'Pink Knock Out', sport (before 2005)
- 'Pink Double Knock Out', sport of double knock out, (before 2007)
- 'Blushing Knock Out', sport, (2001)
- 'Rainbow Knock Out', (before 2005), RADtee' x 'RADral'
- 'Sunny Knock Out', (2006), 'Brite Eyes' x 'RADsweet'
- 'Coral Knock Out', (before 2004), 'RADor' x "RADer'
- 'Peachy Knock Out', (2004), Unnamed seedling parents
- 'White Knock Out', (before 2008), 'RADmom' x 'RADsweet'

== Awards ==
- All-America Rose Selections (AARS) winner, USA, (2000)

== See also ==
- Garden roses
- Rose Hall of Fame
- List of Award of Garden Merit roses
