= Rosa 'Strike It Rich' =

Grandiflora rose cultivar

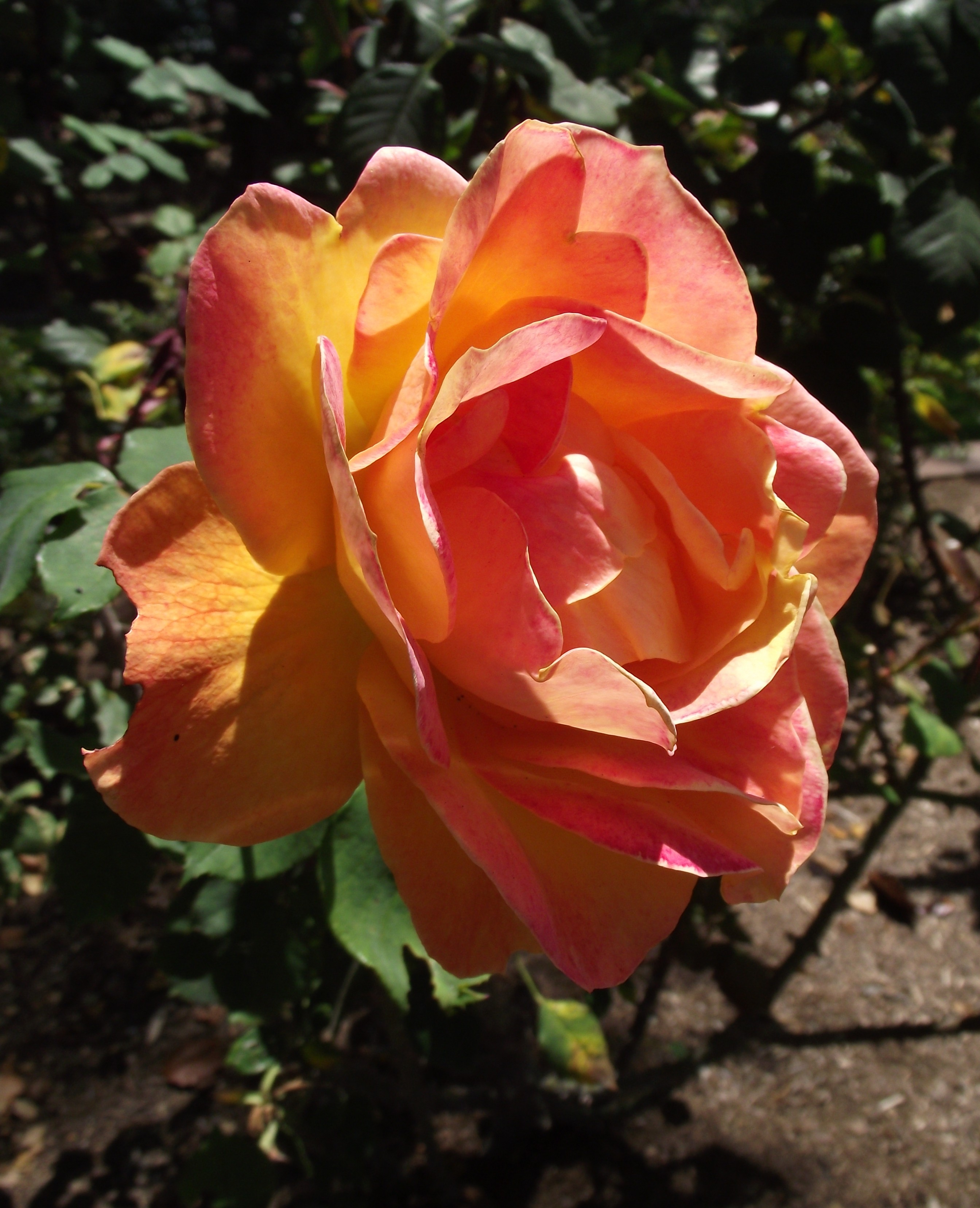
- Rosa 'Strike It Rich'
- Genus: Rosa hybrid
- Hybrid parentage: CHRiscinn x 'Mellow Yellow'
- Cultivar group: Grandiflora
- Cultivar: WEKbepmey
- Marketing names: 'Strike It Rich', 'Orientalia'
- Breeder: Carruth
- Origin: United States, (2005)

Rosa 'Strike It Rich', (a.k.a. WEKbepmey ), is a grandiflora rose cultivar, bred by Tom Carruth, and introduced into the United States by Weeks Rose Growers in 2007. The cultivar was awarded the Portland Gold Medal in 2010.

== Description ==
'Strike It Rich' is a tall, upright shrub, 5 to 7 ft (152—200 cm) in height with a 2 to 3 ft (60—91 cm) spread. Blooms are large, 4—5 in (10—12 cm) in diameter, with 30 to 40 petals. Flowers are a double, cupped bloom form and are borne in large clusters. The flowers are yellow with copper and pink hues, and pink edges. The rose has a strong, spice fragrance and medium, semi-glossy, dark green foliage. 'Strike It Rich' blooms in flushes throughout its growing season. The plant does well in USDA zone 5b and warmer.

== Child plants ==
'Strike It Rich' was used to hybridize the following plants:

- Rosa 'Ch-Ching', (2008)
- Rosa 'Happy Go Lucky', (before 2013)

== Awards ==
- Portland Gold Medal, (2010)

== See also ==
- Garden roses
- Rose Hall of Fame
- List of Award of Garden Merit roses
