= Rosa 'Queen Elizabeth' =

Pink grandiflora rose cultivar

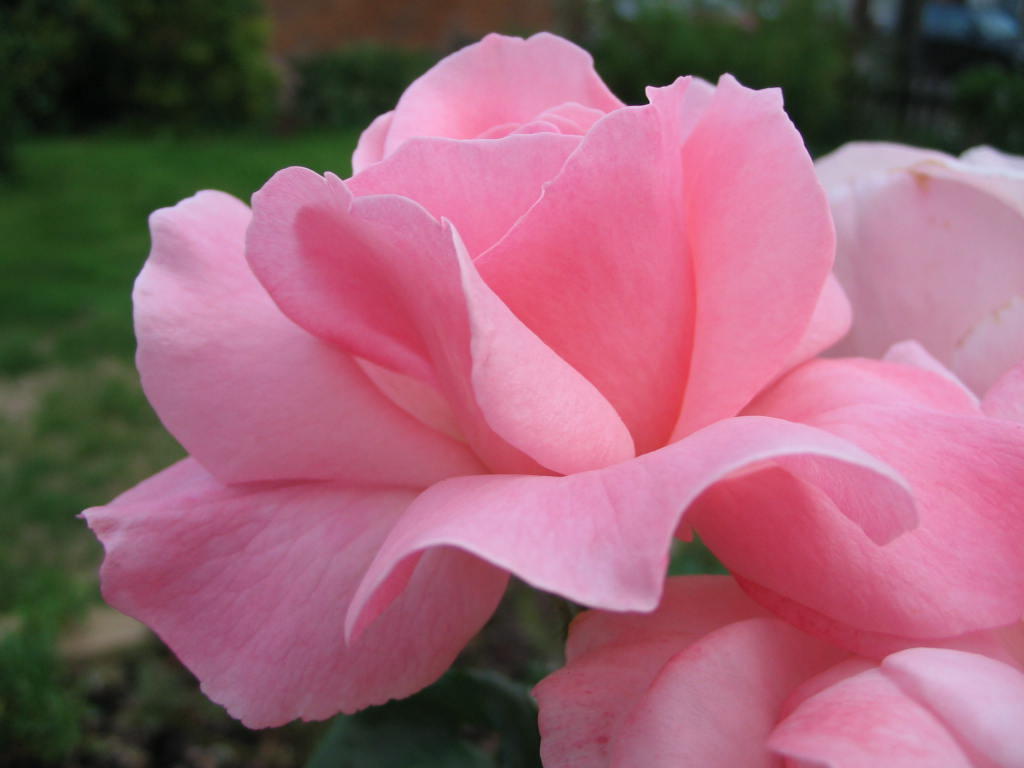
- Rosa 'Queen Elizabeth'
- Genus: Rosa hybrid
- Hybrid parentage: 'Charlotte Armstrong' x 'Floradora'
- Cultivar group: Grandiflora
- Marketing names: 'Queen Elizabeth' 'The Queen Elizabeth Rose' 'The Queen of England'
- Breeder: Dr. Walter E. Lammerts (United States, before 1951)
- Origin: United States, 1954

Rosa 'Queen Elizabeth' is a pink Grandiflora rose cultivar, bred by noted American rose breeder Dr. Walter Lammerts in 1954. The rose variety is very popular worldwide and has won numerous awards, including "World's Favorite Rose", (1979).

== History ==
'Queen Elizabeth' was named in honor of Queen Elizabeth II when she ascended the British throne in 1952. The stock parents of 'Queen Elizabeth' are the hybrid tea, Rosa 'Charlotte Armstrong' and the floribunda, 'Floradora'. 'Queen Elizabeth' has been used to hybridize 30 new rose cultivars. Several color sports of 'Queen Elizabeth' have been introduced, including 'Yellow Queen Elizabeth', (1964) and 'White Queen Elizabeth', (aka 'Blanc Queen Elizabeth'), (1965). The climbing sport, 'Climbing Queen Elizabeth', (1957) is a very popular, vigorous climbing rose.

== Description ==
'Queen Elizabeth' is a tall, narrow upright shrub, 5 to 10 feet (152–305 cm) in height with a 3 to 4 feet (91 to 122 cm) spread. Blooms have an average diameter of 4 to 5 inches (10–13 cm) with large, full petals (26 to 40). Flowers are pale pink and darker pink on petal backs. Flowers come in large, open clusters of 3–15, and have a moderate, sweet fragrance. The flowers have a high-centered to cupped bloom form. Buds are pointed. The leaves are large, leathery, and dark green with rounded leaflets. The plant's sturdy, upright stems make it a popular cutting rose. It is a vigorous rose with thick stems and large prickles, and grows well in poor soils. The plant is very disease resistant and blooms in flushes from spring through autumn. It thrives in USDA zone 5b through 9b.

== Awards ==
- Portland Gold Medal, (1954)
- All-America Rose Selections winner, USA, (1955)
- American Rose Society Gold Medal, (1957)
- Golden Rose of the Hague, (1968)
- World's Favorite Rose, (1979)
- Award of Excellence for Best Established Rose, (2015)

== See also ==
- Garden roses
- Rose Hall of Fame
- List of Award of Garden Merit roses
