= Rose Hall of Fame =

The Rose Hall of Fame contains roses considered world favourites by a vote of members of the World Federation of Rose Societies. Inductees are announced every three years at World Rose Conventions. Additionally, popular historical roses and roses of genealogical importance are inducted in the Old Rose Hall of Fame.

== List of Hall of Fame roses ==
Induction year	Cultivar name	Hybridiser	Introduced in	Cultivar Group	Notes	Image
1976	'Peace' synonyms: 'Mme A. Meilland', 'Gioia' 'Gloria Dei'	Meilland	1939	Hybrid Tea	Most Beautiful French Rose 1942; Portland Gold Medal 1944; AARS 1946; RNRS Gold Medal 1947; The Hague Gold Medal 1965	
1979	'Queen Elizabeth'	Lammerts	1954	Grandiflora	Portland Gold Medal 1954; AARS 1955; RNRS Gold Medal 1955; President's International Trophy 1955; The Hague Gold Medal 1957	
1981	'Fragrant Cloud' synonyms: 'Duftwolke' 'Nuage Parfumé'	Tantau	1963	Hybrid Tea	ADR 1964; Gamble Fragrance Award 1969 & 1970; Portland Gold Medal 1966 & 1967; RNRS Gold Medal 1963	
1983	'Iceberg' synonyms: 'Fée des Neiges' 'Schneewittchen'	Kordes	1958	Floribunda	Baden-Baden Gold Medal 1958; RNRS Gold Medal 1958; ADR 1960 (detracted)	
1985	'Double Delight'	Swim & Ellis	1977	Hybrid Tea	Baden-Baden Gold Medal 1976; Rome Gold Medal 1976; All-America Rose Selection 1977	
1988	'Papa Meilland'	Meilland	1963	Hybrid Tea	Baden-Baden Gold Medal 1962; Gamble Fragrance Award 1974	
1991	'Pascali'	Lens	1963	Hybrid Tea	The Hague Gold Medal 1963; AARS 1969	
1994	'Just Joey'	Cant	1972	Hybrid Tea	Cants of Colchester	
1997	'New Dawn'	Dreer	1930	Hybrid Wichurana	Somerset Rose Nursery	
2000	'Ingrid Bergman' synonym: 'POUlman'	Poulsen	1984	Hybrid Tea	Madrid Gold Medal 1986; The Hague Golden Rose 1987 AGM 1993	
2003	Bonica 82	Meilland	1981	Floribunda	ADR 1982 (detracted); AARS 1986; AGM 1993	
2006	'Pierre de Ronsard' synonyms: 'Eden 85' 'Meiviolin'	Meilland	1985	Climber	Romantica Collection	
2006	'Elina'	Dickson	1984	Hybrid Tea	ADR 1987; Gold Star of the South Pacific 1987; AGM 1993	
2009	'Graham Thomas'	Austin	1983	English Rose		
2012	'Sally Holmes'	Holmes	1976	Hybrid Musk	Monza Gold Medal 1979; Baden-Baden Gold Medal 1980; Portland Gold Medal 1993	
2015	'Cocktail'	Meilland	1957	Shrub/Climber	Bagatelle Certificat de Mérite 1957	

== List of Hall of Fame old roses ==
Induction year	Cultivar name	Hybridiser	Introduced in	Notes	Image
1988	'Cécile Brunner' synonyms: 'Mignon' 'Sweetheart'	Ducher	1881	Polyantha, original induction	
1988	'Gloire de Dijon'	Jacotot	1853	Climbing Tea original induction	
1988	'Old Blush'	Unknown	1790	China /Bengale original induction	
1988	'Souvenir de la Malmaison'	Bèluze	1843	Bourbon original induction	
2000	'Gruss an Teplitz'	Geschwind	1897	Hybrid China	
2003	'Madame Alfred Carrière'	Schwartz	1875	Climbing	
2006	'Madame Hardy'	Hardy	1832	Damask	
2009	'Rosa Mundi' synonym: Rosa gallica 'Versicolor'	Unknown	Very Old	Gallica	
2012	Rosa 'Mutabilis' synonym: Rosa chinensis 'Mutabilis'	Unknown	1894	China / Bengale	
2012	Rosa 'Officinalis' synonyms: Rosa gallica officinalis	Unknown	1240	Gallica	
2015	'Charles de Mills'	Unknown	1790	Gallica	

== See also ==
- ADR rose
- List of Award of Garden Merit roses
- All-America Rose Selections
