= Rosa 'Claude Monet' =

Red blend Hybrid tea rose cultivar

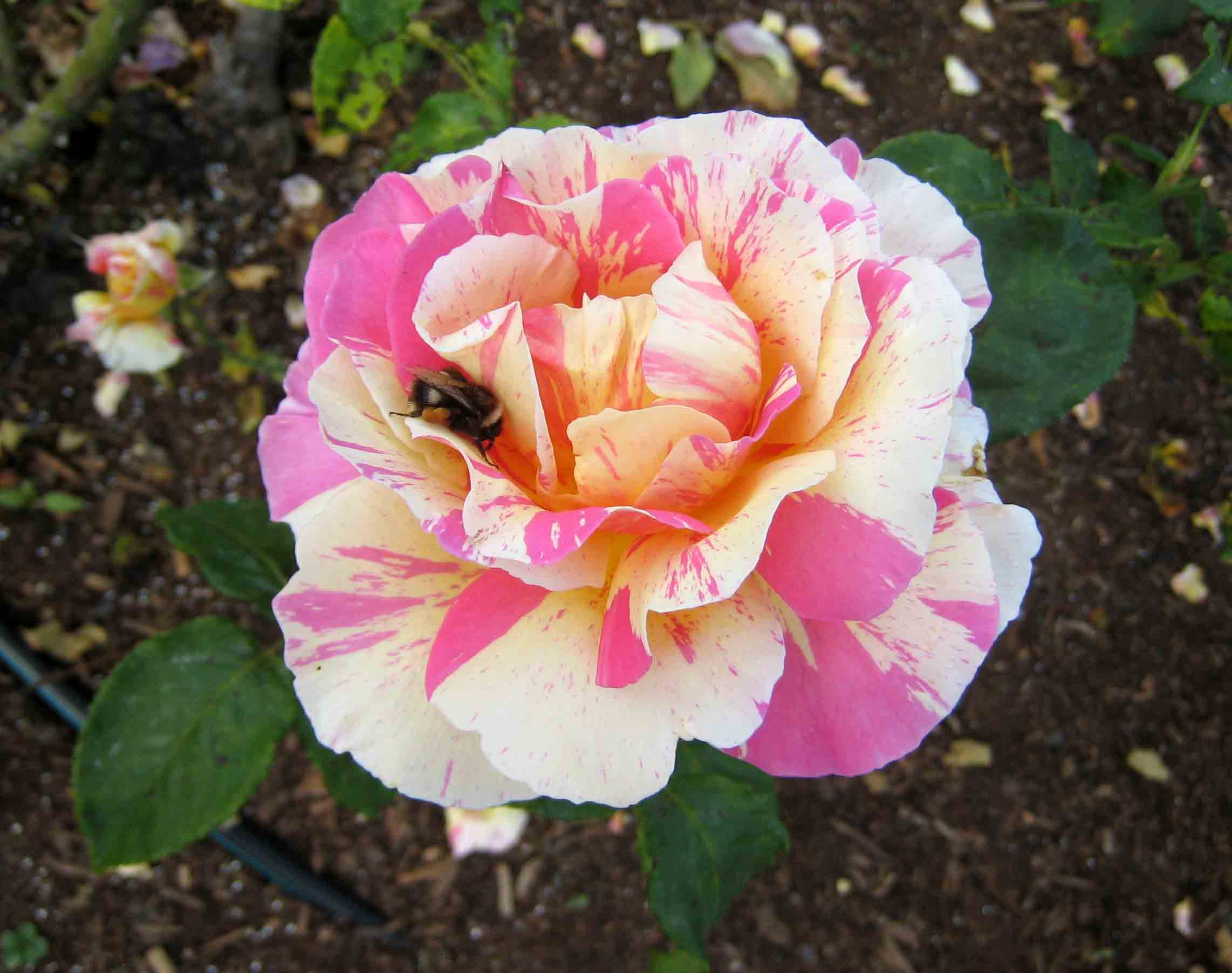
- Rosa 'Claude Monet'
- Genus: Rosa hybrid
- Cultivar group: Hybrid tea
- Cultivar: 'JACdesa'
- Breeder: Jack E. Christensen
- Origin: United States, 1992

Rosa 'Claude Monet' (aka JACdesa) is a red blend hybrid tea rose cultivar, bred by American hybridizer, Jack E. Christensen. The rose is named for the French painter, Claude Monet. It was introduced into the US in 1992 by Jackson & Perkins Co. and also introduced the same year in France by Delbard Nursery as part of their Painter roses series.

== Description ==
'Claude Monet' is a medium-sized upright, bushy hybrid tea rose, 3 to 4 ft (0.91–1.22 m) in height, with a 2 ft (0.61 m) spread. It has a double (17–25 petals), high-centered bloom form. Bloom size is 2 to 3 in (51 to 76 mm). The rose has a mild, fruity fragrance. The flowers are "lemon yellow splashed with crimson when opening, then cream and pink as they age." The flowers are carried singly or in clusters of up to five flowers. 'Claude Monet' blooms in flushes throughout the growing season.

This hybrid tea was developed by Christensen before 1992 from unknown parents. The rose is named for the French painter, Claude Monet. It was introduced into the US in 1992 by Jackson & Perkins and also introduced the same year in France by Delbard Nursery as part of their Painter roses series.

== History ==
=== Jack E. Christensen ===
Jack E. Christensen (1949–2021) was an award-winning American rose breeder, garden writer and biology teacher from Southern California. Christensen was born in Glendale, California in 1949. He showed an early interest in nature and gardening when he was very young. In high school, Christensen won a scholarship to University of California, Los Angeles. He initially planned to become a doctor, but later changed his mind and transferred to Cal Poly Pomona to study Botany.

Christensen spent most of his horticultural career at Armstrong Nurseries in Southern California. He progressed through the company until he became a hybridizer of roses and fruit trees, and vice-president of research. During his career, he developed over 80 new rose cultivars, including 'Henry Fonda', 'Peppermint Twist', 'White Lightnin'' and 'Gold Medal''. Christensen was the youngest hybridizer to win an All-America Rose Selections (AARS) in 1986, with his hybrid tea, 'Voodoo'.
