= Rosa 'Cricket' =

Orange-red miniature rose cultivar

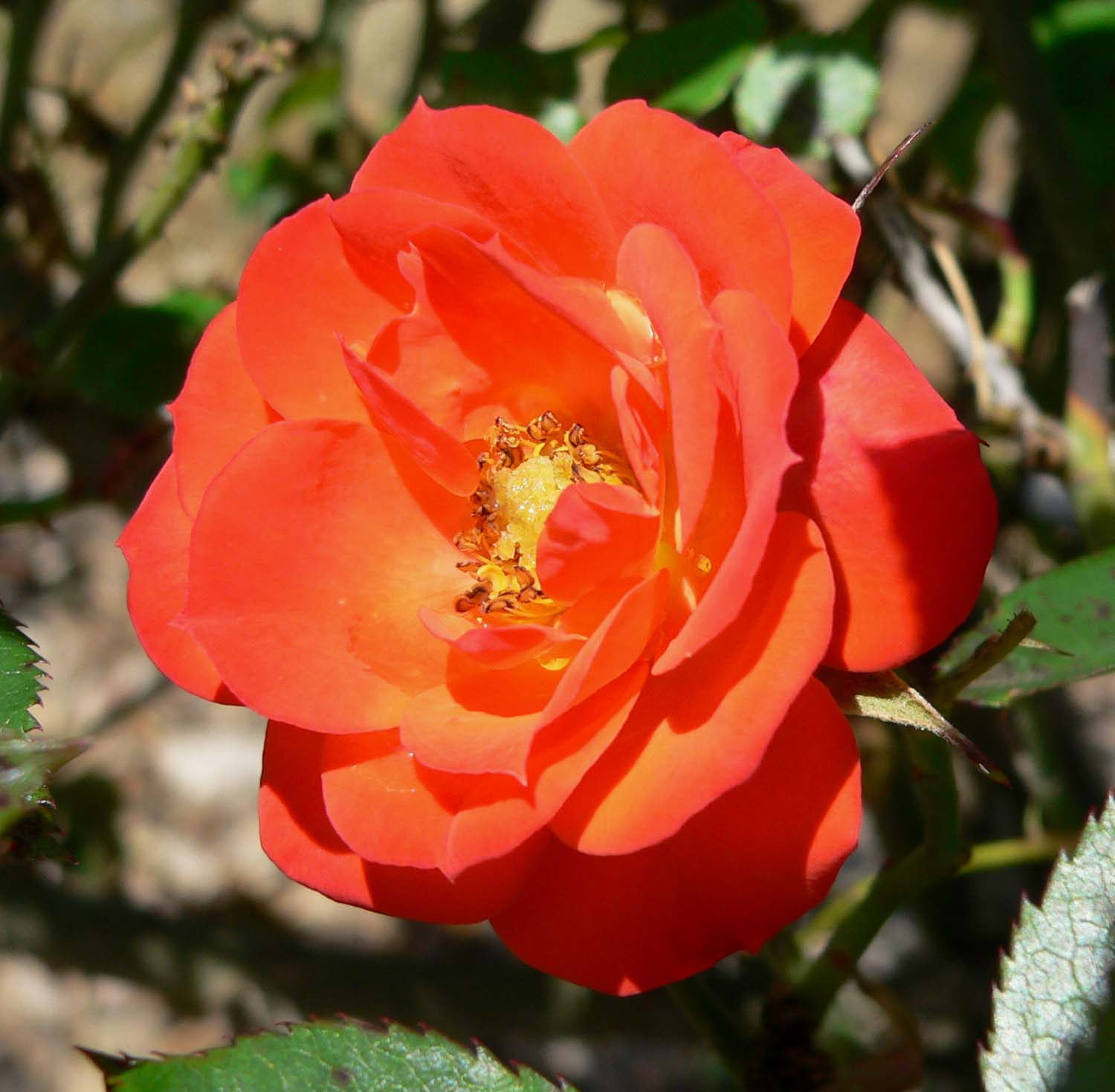
- Rosa 'Cricket'
- Genus: Rosa hybrid
- Hybrid parentage: 'Anytime' × 'Katherine Loker'
- Cultivar group: Miniature rose
- Cultivar: 'AROket'
- Breeder: Jack E. Christensen
- Origin: United States, 1978

Rosa 'Cricket' (a.k.a. AROket) is an orange blend miniature rose cultivar, bred by American hybridizer, Jack E. Christensen, and introduced in the United States by Armstrong Roses in 1978.

== Description ==
'Cricket' is a small, bushy miniature rose, 12 to 18 in (300–460 mm) in height, with a 15 to 18 in (380–460 mm) spread. It has a double (16–25 petals) bloom form. Bloom size is less than 2 in (51 mm). The rose has a mild fragrance. Flower color is orange and an orange-red blend. It blooms repeatedly throughout the growing season. The rose cultivar was developed by Christiansen and introduced in the United States by Armstrong Roses in 1978. The plant's stock parents are Miniature rose, 'Anytime', and Floribunda, 'Katherine Loker'. It makes a good container rose.

== Jack E. Christensen ==
Jack E. Christensen (1949–2021) was an award-winning American rose breeder, garden writer and biology teacher from Southern California. Christensen was born in Glendale, California in 1949. He showed an early interest in nature and gardening when he was very young. In high school, Christensen won a scholarship to University of California, Los Angeles. He initially planned to become a doctor, but later changed his mind and transferred to Cal Poly Pomona to study Botany.

Christensen spent most of his horticultural career at Armstrong Nurseries in Southern California. He progressed through the company until he became a hybridizer of roses and fruit trees, and vice-president of research. During his career, he developed over 80 new rose cultivars, including 'Henry Fonda', 'Peppermint Twist', 'White Lightnin'' and 'Gold Medal''. Christensen was the youngest hybridizer to win an All-America Rose Selections (AARS) in 1986, with his hybrid tea, 'Voodoo'.
