= Rosa 'Brass Band' =

Orange Floribunda rose cultivar

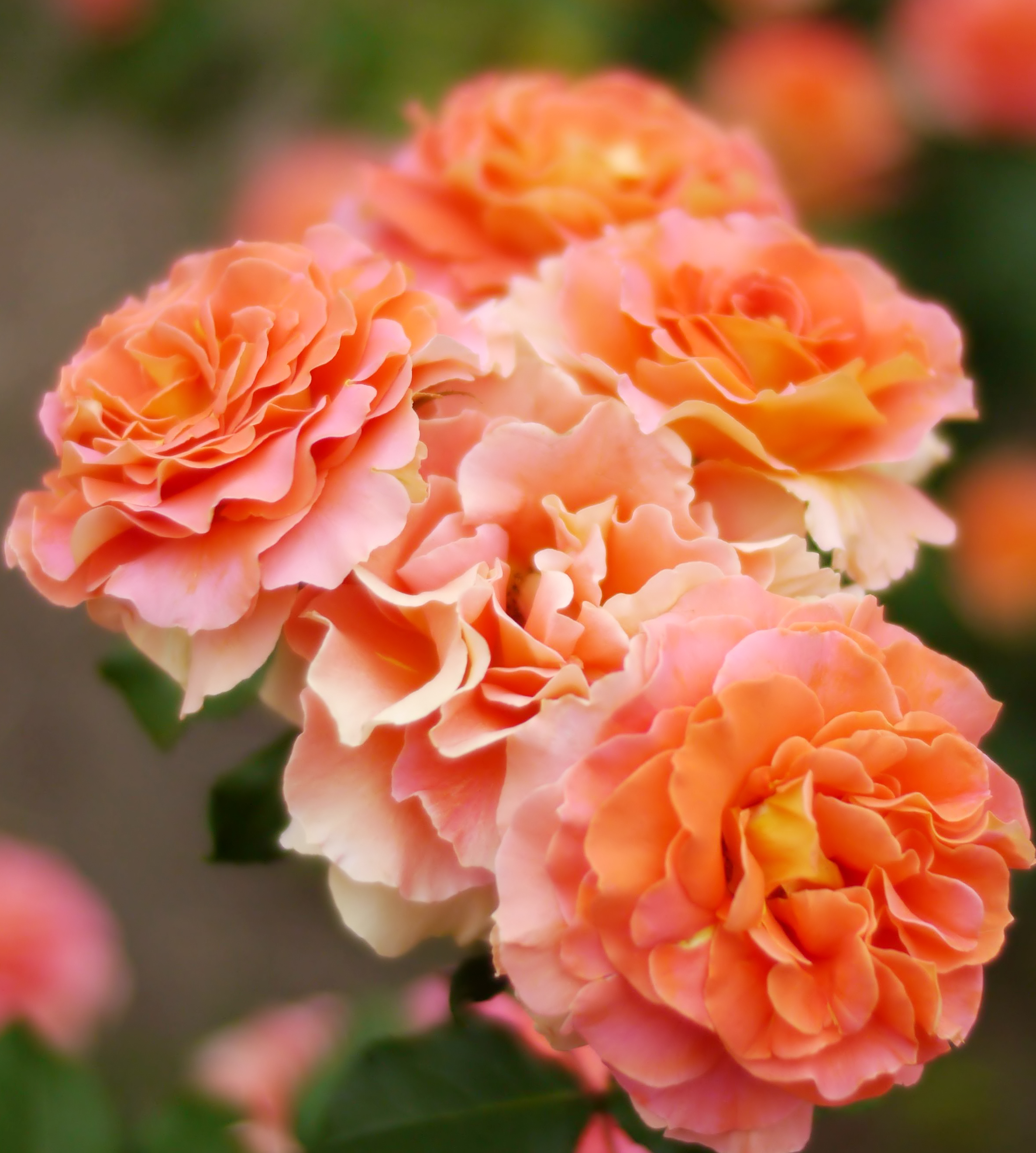
- Rosa 'Brass Band'
- Genus: Rosa hybrid
- Hybrid parentage: 'Gold Badge' x (Unnamed seedling x 'Holy Toledo')
- Cultivar group: Floribunda
- Cultivar: 'JACcofl'
- Breeder: Jack E. Christensen
- Origin: United States, 1993

Rosa 'Brass Band' (aka JACcofl) is an orange blend Floribunda cultivar, bred by American hybridizer, Jack E. Christensen in 1993. It was introduced in the United States by Jackson & Perkins Co. in 1994. The cultivar was named an All-America Rose Selections (AARS) in 1995.

== Description ==
'Brass Band' is a medium-sized, bushy Floribunda rose, 3 to 4 ft (0.91–1.22 m) in height, with a 3 to 4 ft (0.91–1.22 m) spread. It has a cupped, ruffled bloom form. Bloom size is 2 to 3 in (51 to 76 mm). The rose has a mild fragrance. Bloom color is orange with paler orange edges. The backs of petals are yellow, and any yellow in the flower fades over time, so that the orange coloring is more accentuated as the flower matures. Bloom color is brightest in cool weather. The flowers are carried in large clusters of 5–9 blooms. Leaves are dark green and semi-glossy. 'Brass Band' blooms in flushes throughout the growing season.

== History ==
=== Jack E. Christensen ===
Jack E. Christensen (1949–2021) was an award-winning American rose breeder, garden writer and biology teacher from Southern California. Christensen was born in Glendale, California in 1949. He showed an early interest in nature and gardening when he was very young. In high school, Christensen won a scholarship to University of California, Los Angeles. He initially planned to become a doctor, but later changed his mind and transferred to Cal Poly Pomona to study Botany.

Christensen spent most of his horticultural career at Armstrong Nurseries in Southern California. He progressed through the company until he became a hybridizer of roses and fruit trees, and vice-president of research. During his career, he developed over 80 new rose cultivars, including 'Henry Fonda', 'Peppermint Twist', 'White Lightnin'' and 'Gold Medal''. Christensen was the youngest hybridizer to win an All-America Rose Selections (AARS) in 1986, with his hybrid tea, 'Voodoo'.

=== 'Brass Band' ===
'Brass Band' was developed by Jack Christensen in 1993 from a cross between the Floribunda cultivar, 'Gold Badge', and the results of a cross between an unnamed seedling and the miniature rose, 'Holy Toledo'. The cultivar was named an All-America Rose Selections (AARS) in 1995.
