= Rosa 'Fragrant Plum' =

Mauve blend Grandiflora rose cultivar

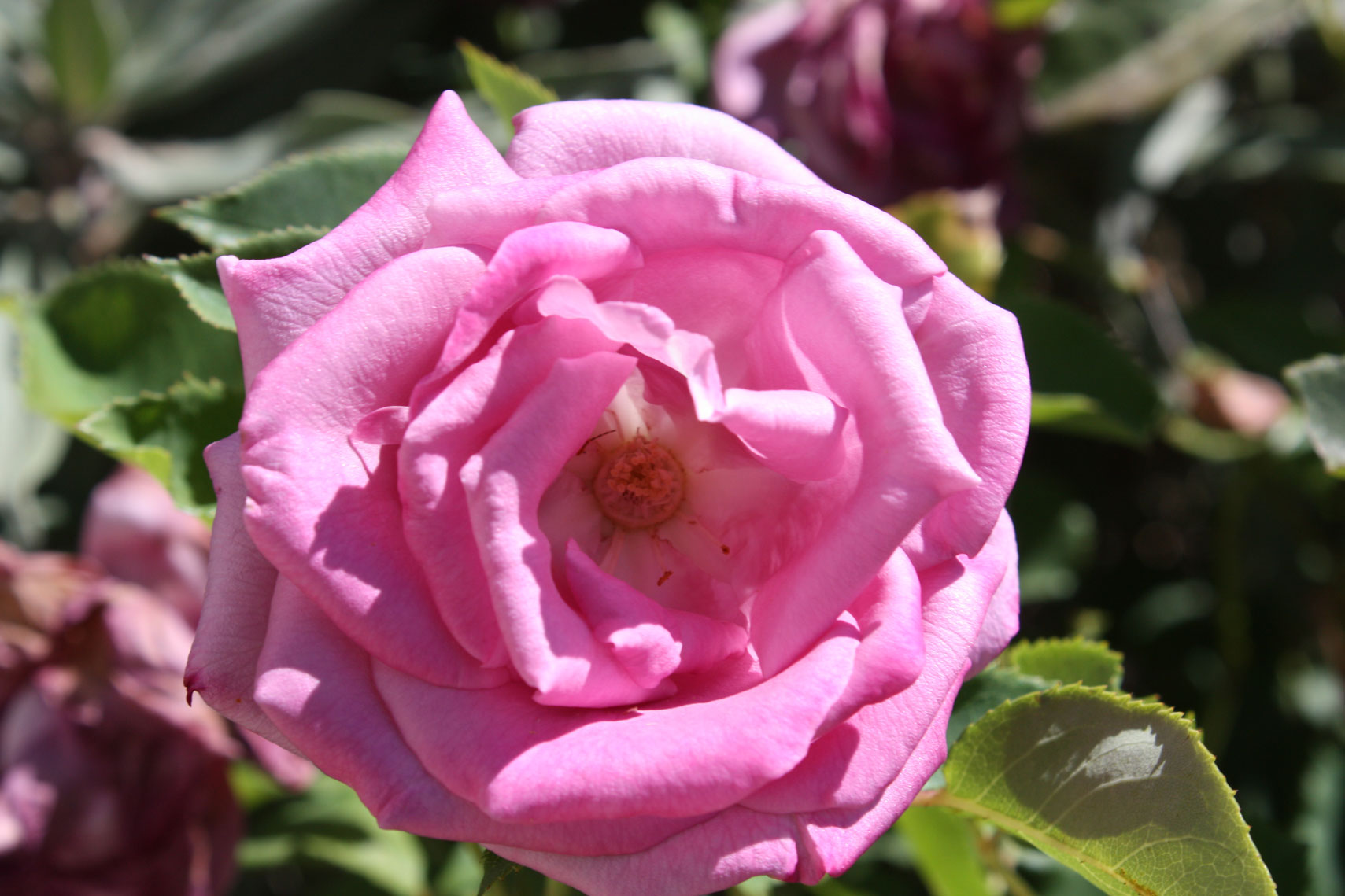
- Rosa 'Fragrant Plum'
- Genus: Rosa hybrid
- Hybrid parentage: 'Shocking Blue' × 'Blue Nile' × ( 'Ivory Tower' × 'Angel Face').
- Cultivar group: Grandiflora
- Cultivar: 'AROplumi'
- Breeder: Jack E. Christensen
- Origin: United States, 1988

Rosa 'Fragrant Plum' (a.k.a. AROplumi) is a mauve blend Grandiflora rose cultivar, bred by American hybridizer, Jack E. Christensen before 1988. The rose was awarded the ARS James Alexander Gamble Rose Fragrance Award in 2007. 'Fragrant Plum' thrives in hot climates and is popular in Australia and the warmer gardening zones in the USA.

== Description ==
'Fragrant Plum' is a tall, upright Grandiflora rose, 4 to 7 ft (1.2–2.1 m) in height, with a 3 to 4 ft (0.91–1.22 m) spread. It has a high-centered, double bloom form. Bloom size is 4 to 5 in (100 to 130 mm). The rose has a strong, fruity fragrance. Bloom color is crimson or magenta when in bud, but opens to lavender or mauve with purple edges. The flowers are typically borne singly or in small clusters on long stems. Leaves are large and dark green. 'Fragrant Plum' blooms in flushes throughout the growing season. It thrives in hot seasons and is popular with gardeners in Australia and the warmer hardiness zones in North America.

== History ==
=== Jack E. Christensen ===
Jack E. Christensen (1949–2021) was an award-winning American rose breeder, garden writer and biology teacher from Southern California. Christensen was born in Glendale, California in 1949. He showed an early interest in nature and gardening when he was very young. In high school, Christensen won a scholarship to University of California, Los Angeles. He initially planned to become a doctor, but later changed his mind and transferred to Cal Poly Pomona to study Botany.

Christensen spent most of his horticultural career at Armstrong Nurseries in Southern California. He progressed through the company until he became a hybridizer of roses and fruit trees, and vice-president of research. During his career, he developed over 80 new rose cultivars, including 'Henry Fonda', 'Cricket', 'White Lightnin'' and 'Gold Medal'. Christensen was the youngest hybridizer to win an All-America Rose Selections (AARS) in 1986, with his hybrid tea, 'Voodoo'.

=== 'Fragrant Plum' ===
'Fragrant Plum' was developed by Jack Christensen from a cross between 'Shocking Blue' and a secong cross between 'Blue Nile' x ( 'Ivory Tower' x 'Angel Face'). The new rose cultivar was introduced in the United States by Armstrong Roses in 1982. The cultivar was used to hybridize one child plant, 'Flamingo Dancer'. The cultivar won the ARS James Alexander Gamble Rose Fragrance Award in 2007.
