= Rosa 'Midas Touch' =

Yellow hybrid tea rose cultivar

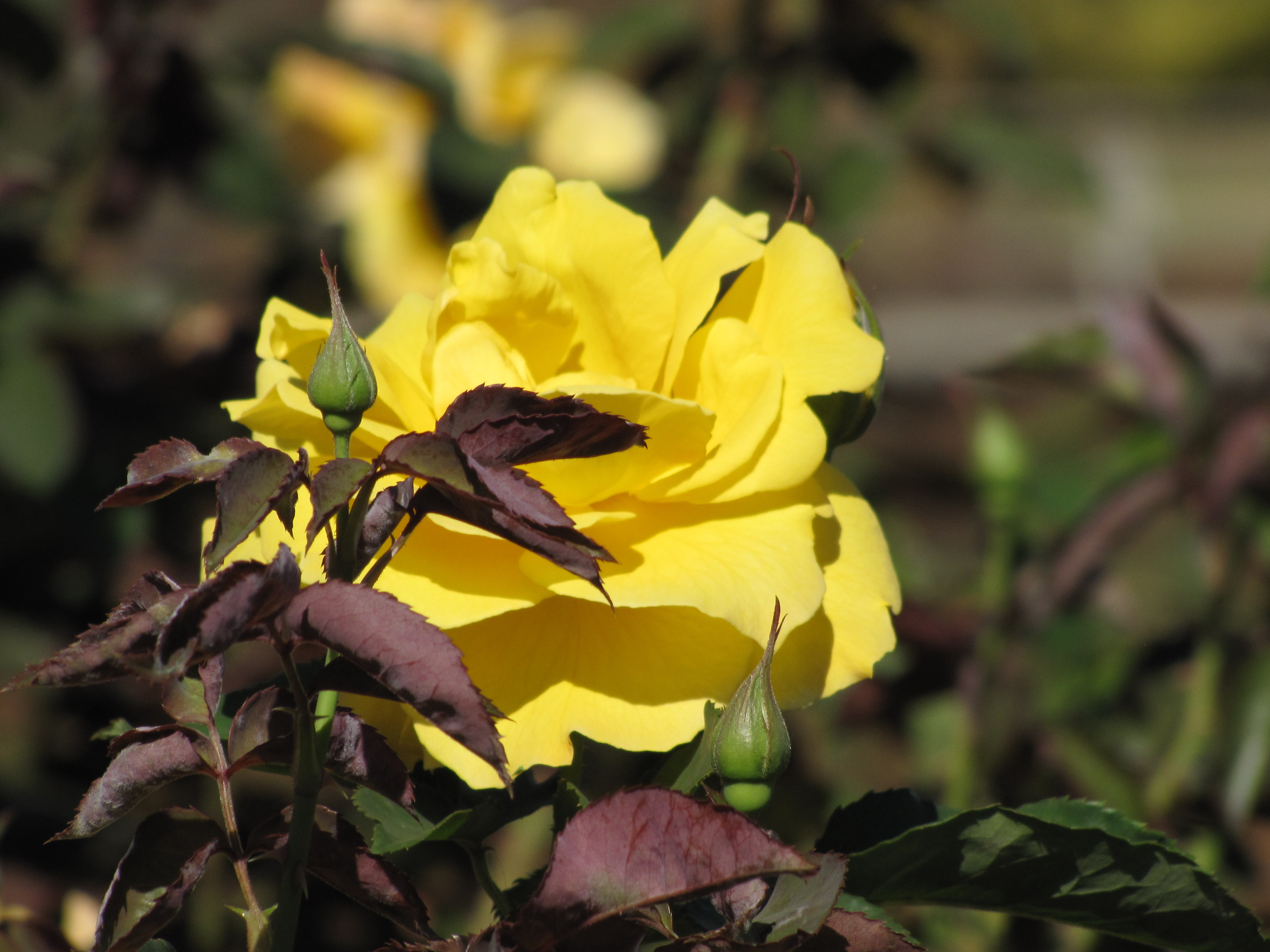
- Rosa 'Midas Touch'
- Genus: Rosa hybrid
- Hybrid parentage: 'Friesensöhne' x 'Brandy'
- Cultivar group: Hybrid tea
- Cultivar: 'JACtou'
- Breeder: Jack E. Christensen
- Origin: United States, 1994

Rosa 'Midas Touch' (aka JACtou) is a yellow Hybrid tea rose cultivar, bred by American hybridizer, Jack E. Christensen, in 1992. The rose was introduced in the United States by Bear Creek Gardens, Inc. in 1994 as 'Midas Touch'. The rose won the All-America Rose Selections (AARS) award in 1994.

== Description ==
'Midas Touch' is a tall, upright, bushy hybrid tea rose, 5 to 6 ft (1.5–1.8 m) in height, with a 3 to 4 ft (0.91–1.22 m) spread. It has a lightly double, cupped bloom form. Bloom size is 2 to 3 in (51 to 76 mm). The rose has a moderate, musky fragrance. Flower color is a bright golden-yellow with golden stamens. The flowers are typically borne singly, but sometimes are carried in small clusters and hold up well in rainy weather. 'Midas Touch' is a vigorous grower and has large, matte, medium-green leaves. It is very disease resistant.

== History ==
=== Jack E. Christensen ===
Jack E. Christensen (1949–2021) was an award-winning American rose breeder, garden writer and biology teacher from Southern California. Christensen was born in Glendale, California in 1949. He showed an early interest in nature and gardening when he was very young. In high school, Christensen won a scholarship to University of California, Los Angeles. He initially planned to become a doctor, but later changed his mind and transferred to Cal Poly Pomona to study Botany.

Christensen spent most of his horticultural career at Armstrong Nurseries in Southern California. He progressed through the company until he became a hybridizer of roses and fruit trees, and vice-president of research. During his career, he developed over 80 new rose cultivars, including 'Henry Fonda', 'Gold Medal', 'Cricket', 'White Lightnin' and 'Fragrant Plum'. Christensen was the youngest hybridizer to win an All-America Rose Selections (AARS) in 1986, with his hybrid tea, 'Voodoo'.

In 2001, Christensen left Armstrong Nurseries and became a gardening writer for the Inland Valley Daily Bulletin in Rancho Cucamonga, California. He also took a position as a biology teacher at Chaffey High School in Ontario, where he taught for 20 years. On March 10, 2021, at the age of 72, Christensen died after a long illness.

=== 'Midas Touch' ===
'Midas Touch' was developed by Christensen in 1992 from a cross between hybrid tea rose, 'Brandy' and shrub rose, 'Friesensöhne'. The rose was introduced in the United States by Bear Creek Gardens, Inc. in 1994 as 'Midas Touch'. The rose won the All-America Rose Selections (AARS) award in 1994.
