= Rosa 'Peppermint Twist' =

Red and white Grandiflora rose cultivar

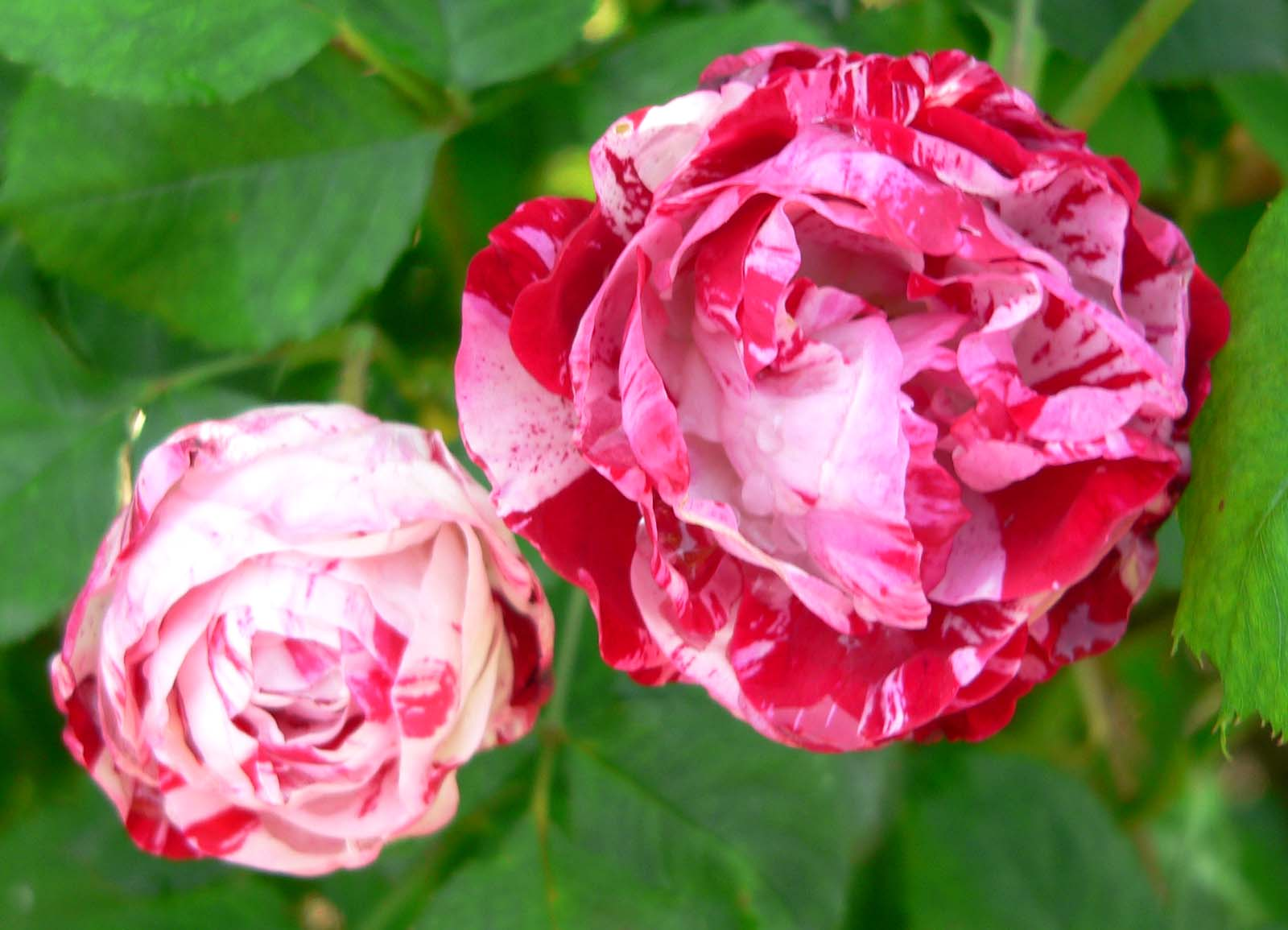
- Rosa 'Peppermint Twist'
- Genus: Rosa hybrid
- Cultivar group: Grandiflora
- Cultivar: 'JACraw'
- Marketing names: 'Red and White Delight', 'Arabesque' (Floribunda)
- Breeder: Jack E. Christensen
- Origin: United States, 1988

Rosa 'Peppermint Twist' (a.k.a. JACraw) is a red and white striped Grandiflora rose cultivar, bred by American hybridizer, Jack E. Christensen before 1988. It was introduced in the United States by Jackson & Perkins Co. as 'Peppermint Twist'.

== Description ==
'Peppermint Twist' is a bushy, upright Grandiflora rose, 3 to 5 ft (0.91–1.52 m) in height, with a 3 to 4 ft (0.91–1.22 m) spread. It has a semi-double or double, cupped-to flat bloom form. Bloom size is 4 to 5 in (100 to 130 mm). The rose has little or no fragrance. Bloom color can range from a pink-blend or red-blend to red and white striped. The flowers are typically carried in clusters. Leaves are medium in size, semi-glossy and medium green. 'Peppermint Twist' blooms in flushes throughout the growing season.

== History ==
=== Jack E. Christensen ===
Jack E. Christensen (1949–2021) was an award-winning American rose breeder, garden writer and biology teacher from Southern California. Christensen was born in Glendale, California in 1949. He showed an early interest in nature and gardening when he was very young. In high school, Christensen won a scholarship to University of California, Los Angeles. He initially planned to become a doctor, but later changed his mind and transferred to Cal Poly Pomona to study Botany.

Christensen spent most of his horticultural career at Armstrong Nurseries in Southern California. He progressed through the company until he became a hybridizer of roses and fruit trees, and vice-president of research. During his career, he developed over 80 new rose cultivars, including 'Henry Fonda', 'Brass Band', 'White Lightnin'' and 'Gold Medal''. Christensen was the youngest hybridizer to win an All-America Rose Selections (AARS) in 1986, with his hybrid tea, 'Voodoo'.

=== 'Peppermint Twist' ===
'Peppermint Twist' was developed by Jack Christensen from a cross between the miniature rose, 'Pinstripe', and the Hybrid tea rose, 'Maestro'. It was introduced in the United States by Jackson & Perkins Co. as 'Peppermint Twist'. Other marketing names used for the rose are 'Arabesque' and 'Red and White Delight'. The cultivar was used to hybridize two child plants: the Floribundas, 'Flirtatious' and 'Scentimental'.
