= Jack E. Christensen =

American rose hybridizer (1949–2021)

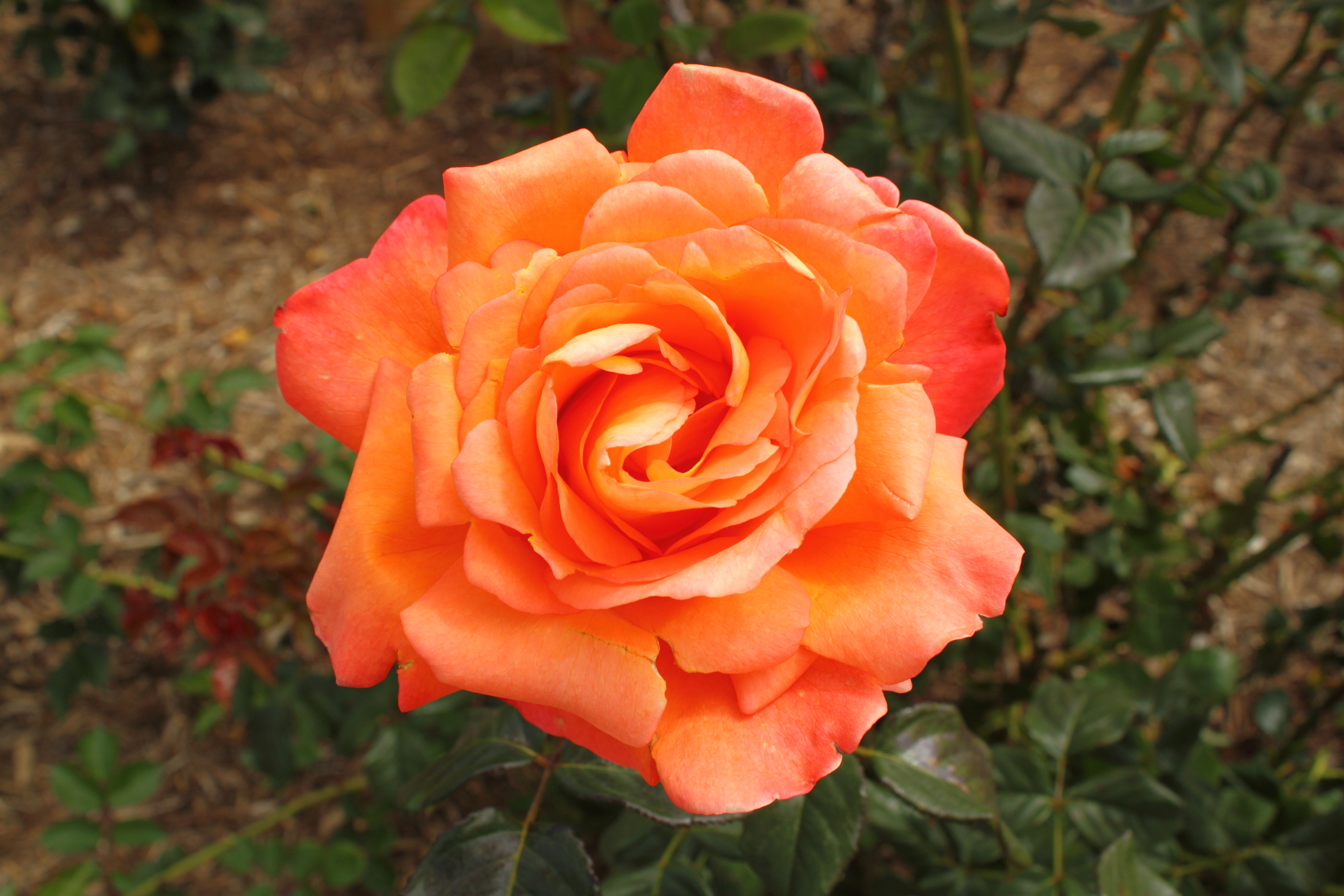
Rosa 'Voodoo', 1986

Jack E. Christensen (1949–2021) was an American rose hybridizer, garden writer and science teacher. He developed more than 80 rose varieties during his career. He was the youngest hybridizer to win an All-America Rose Selections (AARS) award in 1986. His most popular rose varieties are: 'Henry Fonda', 'Gold Medal', 'Midas Touch' and the AARS winner, 'Voodoo'.

== Biography ==
Christensen was born in Glendale, California in 1949. He showed an early interest in nature and gardening when he was very young. In high school, Christensen won a scholarship to University of California, Los Angeles. He initially planned to become a doctor, but later changed his mind and transferred to Cal Poly Pomona to study Botany.

Christensen's first job after college was at Armstrong Nurseries in Southern California, where according to his wife, Jeanie, "he hoed weeds for a year". He progressed through the company until he became a hybridizer of roses and fruit trees, and vice-president of research. During his career, he developed over 80 new rose cultivars, including 'Henry Fonda', 'Gold Medal', and 'Midas Touch'. Christensen was the youngest hybridizer to win an All-America Rose Selections (AARS) in 1986, with his hybrid tea, 'Voodoo'.

In 2001, Christensen left Armstrong Nurseries and became a gardening writer for the Inland Valley Daily Bulletin in Southern California. He also took a position as a biology teacher at Chaffey High School in Ontario, where he taught for 20 years. On March 10, 2021, at the age of 72, Christensen died after a long illness.

== Selected roses ==
- 'White Lightnin', Grandiflora, (before 1979)
- 'Cricket', Miniature, (1978)
- 'Gold Medal', Grandiflora, (1982)
- 'Azure Sea', Hybrid tea, (1983)
- ''Voodoo, Hybrid tea Hybrid tea, (1986)
- 'Peppermint Twist', Floribunda, (1988)
- 'Fragrant Plum, Grandiflora, (1988)
- 'Midas Touch', Hybrid tea, (1992)
- 'Claude Monet', Hybrid tea, (1992)
- 'Brass Band', Floribunda, (1993)
- 'Henry Fonda', Hybrid tea, (1995)
- 'Almost Sunset', Hybrid tea, (1996)

== Rose gallery ==
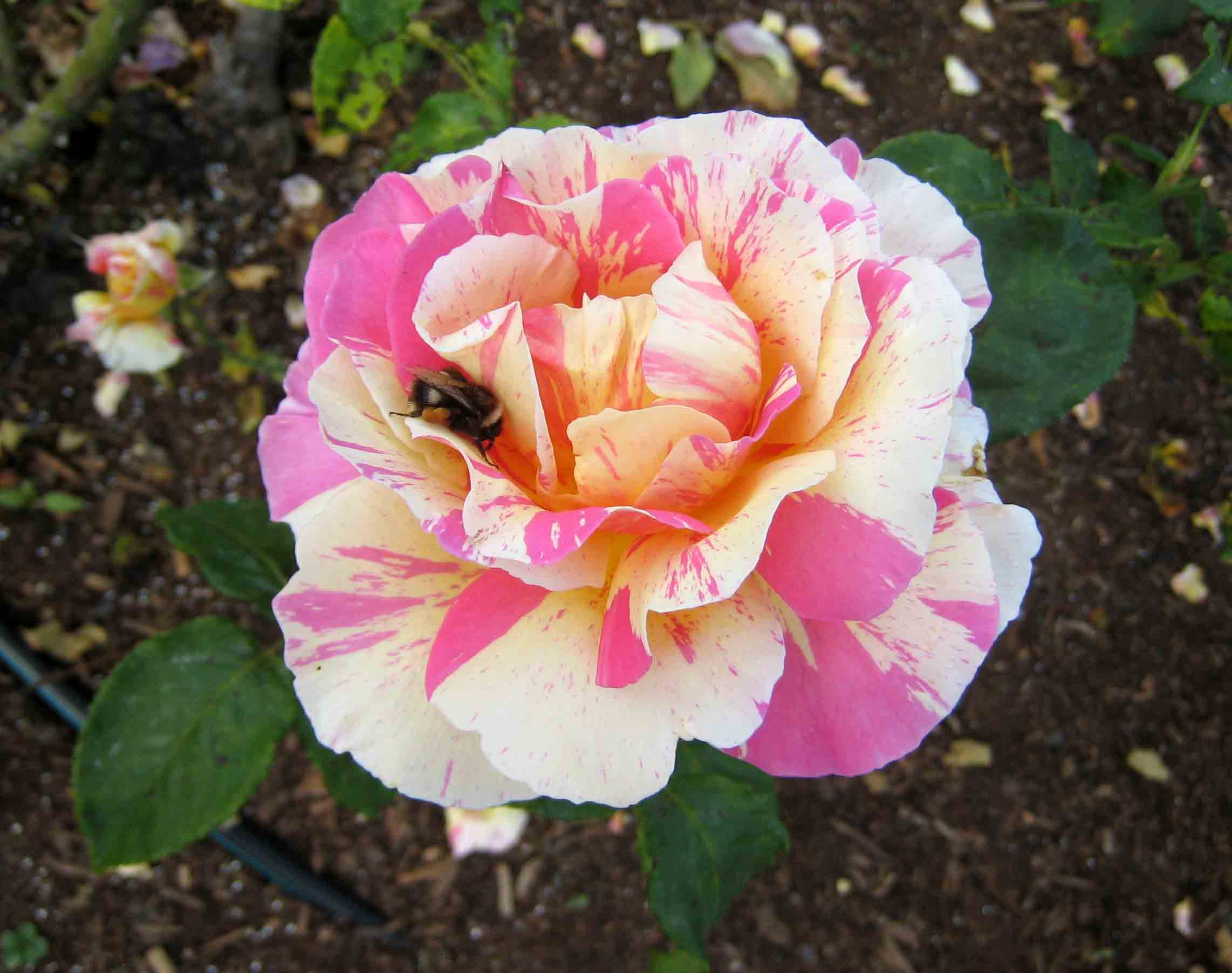
'Claude Monet'

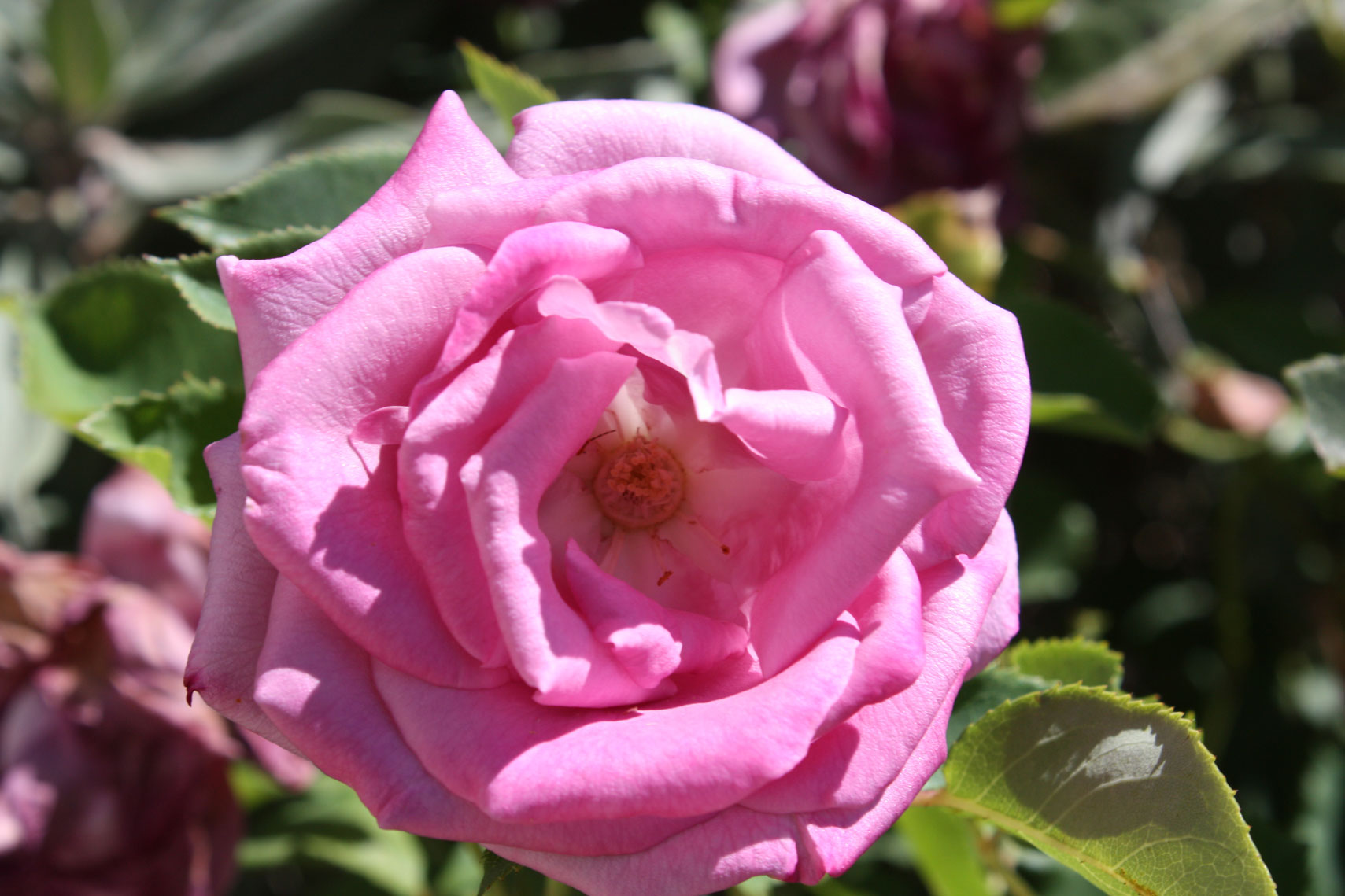
'Fragrant Plum'

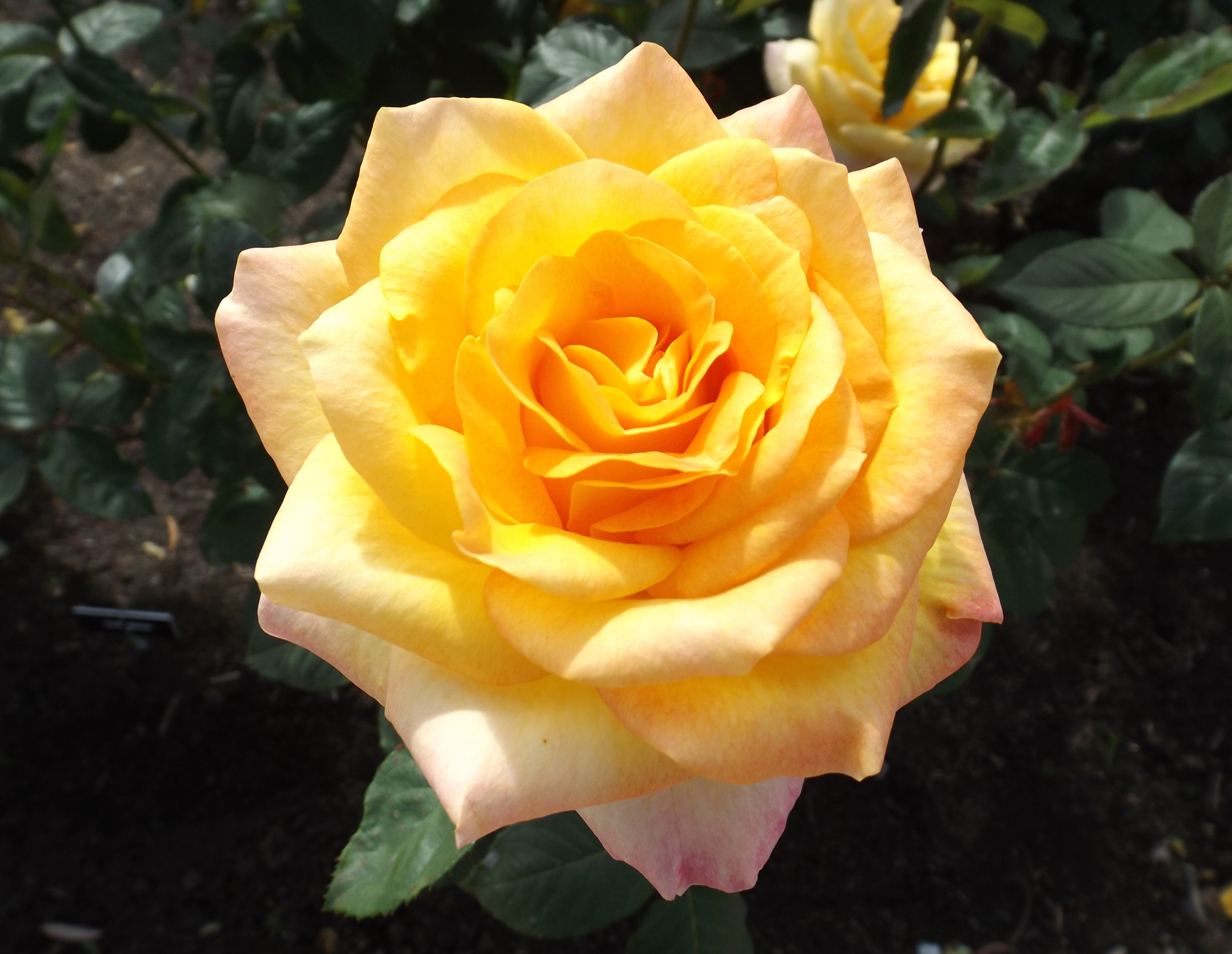
'Gold Medal'

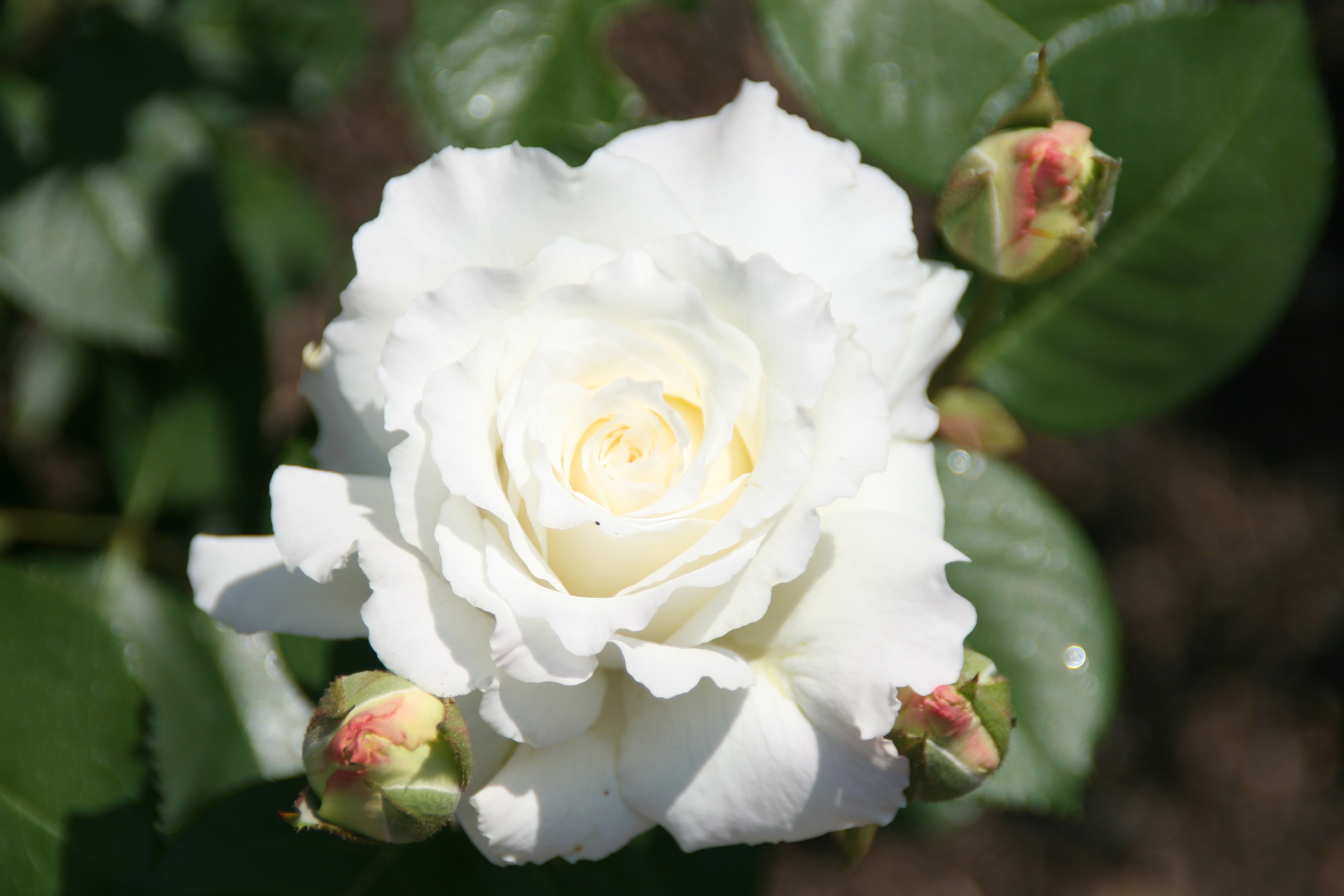
'White Lightnin'

== See also ==
- Garden roses
- Tom Carruth
- Felicitas Svejda
