= Rosa 'Gold Medal' =

Yellow Grandiflora rose cultivar

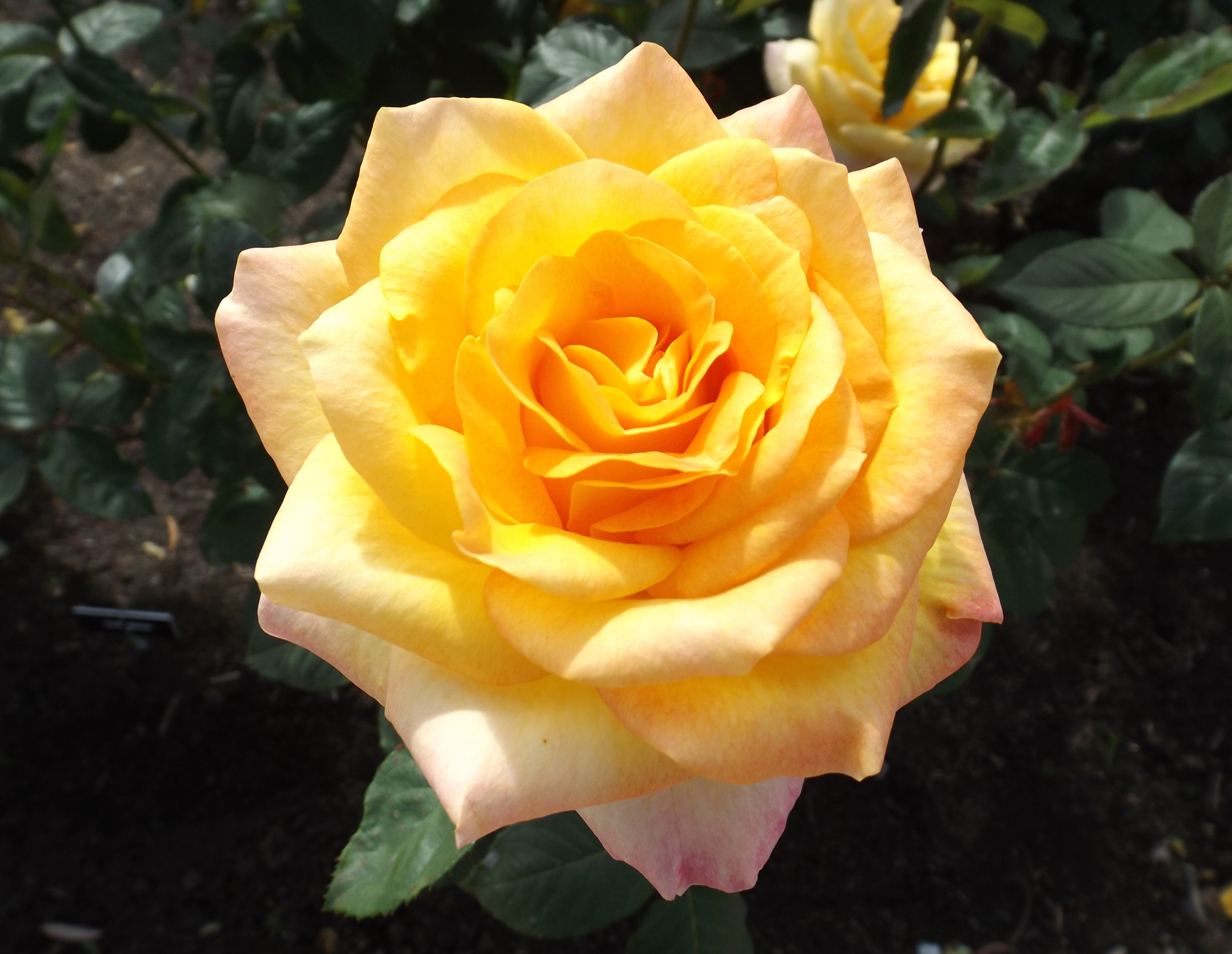
- Rosa 'Gold Medal'
- Genus: Rosa hybrid
- Hybrid parentage: 'Yellow Pages' × '('Granada' × 'Garden Party')
- Cultivar group: Grandiflora
- Cultivar: 'AROyqueli'
- Breeder: Jack E. Christensen
- Origin: United States, 1982

Rosa 'Gold Medal' (aka AROyqueli) is a yellow blend Grandiflora rose cultivar, bred by American hybridizer, Jack E. Christensen and introduced in the United States by Armstrong Roses in 1982. The rose is a vigorous grower and does extremely well in hot climates.

== Description ==
'Gold Medal' is a tall, bushy, upright Grandiflora rose, 4 to 5 ft (1.2–1.5 m) in height, with a 3 to 4 ft (0.91–1.22 m) spread. It has a high-centered, ruffled bloom form. Bloom size is 4 to 5 in (100 to 130 mm). The rose has a light, fruity fragrance. Bloom color is initially a golden yellow with splashes of pink and orange, fading to a pale yellow. The flowers are typically borne singly on long, straight stems or in small clusters. 'Gold Medal' blooms in flushes throughout the growing season. It is almost thornless and has large, semi-glossy, dark green leaves. The plant is a vigorous grower and thrives in hot climates.

== History ==
=== Jack E. Christensen ===
Jack E. Christensen (1949–2021) was an award-winning American rose breeder, garden writer and biology teacher from Southern California. Christensen was born in Glendale, California, in 1949. He showed an early interest in nature and gardening when he was very young. In high school, Christensen won a scholarship to University of California, Los Angeles. He initially planned to become a doctor, but later changed his mind and transferred to Cal Poly Pomona to study Botany.

Christensen spent most of his horticultural career at Armstrong Nurseries in Southern California. He progressed through the company until he became a hybridizer of roses and fruit trees, and vice-president of research. During his career, he developed over 80 new rose cultivars, including 'Henry Fonda', 'Cricket', 'White Lightnin'' and 'Fragrant Plum'. Christensen was the youngest hybridizer to win an All-America Rose Selections (AARS) in 1986, with his hybrid tea, 'Voodoo'.

=== 'Gold Medal' ===
'Gold Medal' was developed by Jack Christensen from a cross between hybrid teas, 'Yellow Pages' and ('Granada' and 'Garden Party'). The new rose cultivar was introduced in the United States by Armstrong Roses in 1982. The cultivar was used to hybridize four child plants: 'Heart O'Gold', 'Lynn Anderson', 'Magic Lantern' and 'St. Patrick'.
