= Rosa 'White Lightnin' =

White Grandiflora rose cultivar

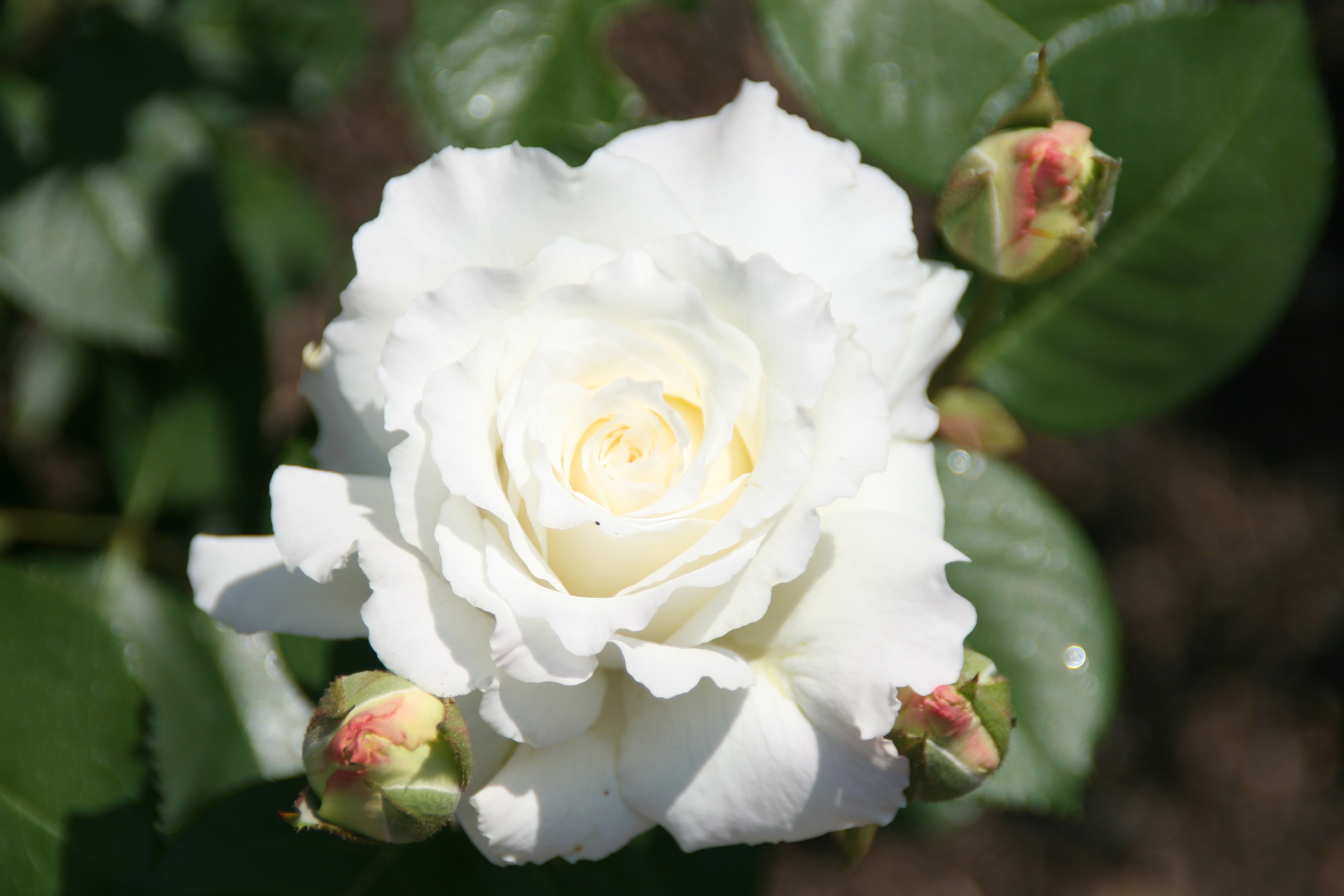
- Rosa 'White Lightnin''
- Genus: Rosa hybrid
- Hybrid parentage: 'Angel Face' x 'Misty'
- Cultivar group: Grandiflora
- Cultivar: 'AROwhif'
- Breeder: Jack E. Christensen, Herbert Swim
- Origin: United States, 1980

Rosa 'White Lightnin'' (a.k.a. AROwhif) is a white Grandiflora rose cultivar, bred by American hybridizers, Jack E. Christensen and Herbert Swim, before 1979. The rose was introduced in the United States by Armstrong Roses in 1980 and won the All-America Rose Selections (AARS) award in 1981.

== Description ==
'White Lightnin'' is a medium, bushy, upright Grandiflora tea rose, 4 to 5 ft (1.2–1.5 m) in height, with a 3 to 4 ft (0.91–1.22 m) spread. It has a high-centered, ruffled bloom form. Bloom size is 2 to 3 in (51 to 76 mm). The rose has a strong citrus fragrance. The flower color is a white blend; it is pure white with a pale yellow center and golden stamens. The flowers are typically borne singly on long, straight stems or in small clusters. 'White Lightnin'' blooms in flushes throughout the growing season and has large, glossy medium green leaves.

== History ==
=== Jack E. Christensen ===
Jack E. Christensen (1949–2021) was an award-winning American rose breeder, garden writer and biology teacher from Southern California. Christensen was born in Glendale, California in 1949. He showed an early interest in nature and gardening when he was very young. In high school, Christensen won a scholarship to University of California, Los Angeles. He initially planned to become a doctor, but later changed his mind and transferred to Cal Poly Pomona to study Botany.

Christensen spent most of his horticultural career at Armstrong Nurseries in Southern California. He progressed through the company until he became a hybridizer of roses and fruit trees, and vice-president of research. During his career, he developed over 80 new rose cultivars, including 'Henry Fonda', 'Gold Medal', 'Cricket', 'White Lightnin' and 'Fragrant Plum'. Christensen was the youngest hybridizer to win an All-America Rose Selections (AARS) in 1986, with his hybrid tea, 'Voodoo'.

=== 'White Lightnin'' ===
'White Lightnin'' was developed by Jack Christensen and Herbert Swim before 1979 from a cross between mauve Floribunda, 'Angel Face' and white Hybrid tea rose, 'Misty'. The new rose cultivar was introduced in the United States by Armstrong Roses in 1980. The rose won the All-America Rose Selections (AARS) award in 1981.
