= Rosa 'Henry Fonda' =

Yellow hybrid tea rose cultivar

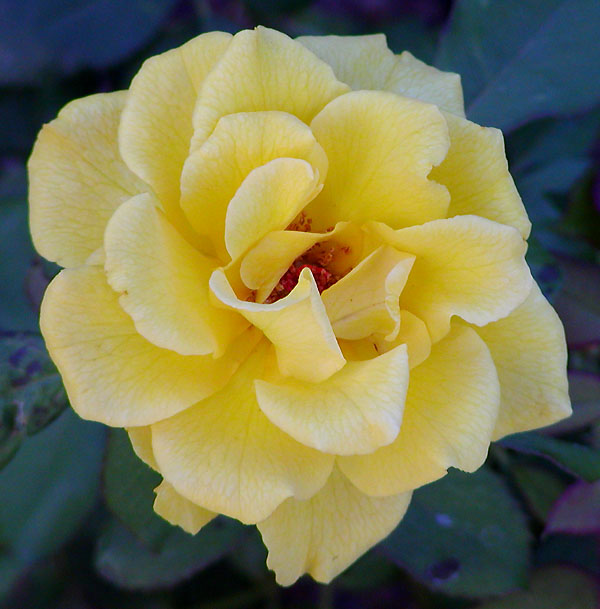
- Rosa 'Henry Fonda'
- Genus: Rosa hybrid
- Hybrid parentage: 'Unnamed seedling' x 'Sunbright'
- Cultivar group: Hybrid tea
- Cultivar: 'JACyes'
- Breeder: Jack E. Christensen
- Origin: United States, 1996

Rosa 'Henry Fonda' (a.k.a. JACyes) is a bright yellow Hybrid tea rose cultivar, bred by American hybridizer, Jack E. Christensen in 1995. The rose was named for film and stage actor, Henry Fonda. It was introduced in the U.S. by Bear Creek Gardens, Inc. in 1996.

== Description ==
'Henry Fonda' is a tall upright hybrid tea rose, 4 to 5 ft (1.2–1.5 m) in height, with a 2 to 3 ft (0.61–0.91 m) spread. It has a large, high-centered, full (26-40 petals) bloom form. Bloom size is 4.7 in (120 mm). The flowers begin as long, pointed, ovoid buds and are bright yellow in color. The rose has little or no fragrance. They are borne on strong stems, primarily as a solitary bloom form, but sometimes in clusters of two or three. The flower's edges can sometimes look frayed or torn. 'Henry Fonda' is a vigorous grower and has medium-sized, dark green, glossy foliage.

== History ==
=== Jack E. Christensen ===
Jack E. Christensen (1949–2021) was an award-winning American rose breeder, garden writer and biology teacher from Southern California. Christensen was born in Glendale, California in 1949. He showed an early interest in nature and gardening when he was very young. In high school, Christensen won a scholarship to University of California, Los Angeles. He initially planned to become a doctor, but later changed his mind and transferred to Cal Poly Pomona to study Botany.

Christensen spent most of his horticultural career at Armstrong Nurseries in Southern California. He progressed through the company until he became a hybridizer of roses and fruit trees, and vice-president of research. During his career, he developed over 80 new rose cultivars, including 'Henry Fonda', 'Gold Medal', 'Cricket', 'White Lightnin' and 'Fragrant Plum'. Christensen was the youngest hybridizer to win an All-America Rose Selections (AARS) in 1986, with his hybrid tea, 'Voodoo'. In 2001, Christensen left Armstrong Nurseries and became a gardening writer for the Inland Valley Daily Bulletin in Rancho Cucamonga, California. He also took a position as a biology teacher at Chaffey High School in Ontario, where he taught for 20 years. On March 10, 2021, at the age of 72, Christensen died after a long illness.

=== 'Henry Fonda' ===
'Henry Fonda' was developed by Christensen from an unnamed seedling and the hybrid tea rose, 'Sunbright', in 1995. The rose was named for film and stage actor, Henry Fonda (1905–1982). The new rose variety was introduced in the U.S. by Bear Creek Gardens, Inc. in 1996.
