= Rosa 'Voodoo' =

Hybrid tea rose cultivar

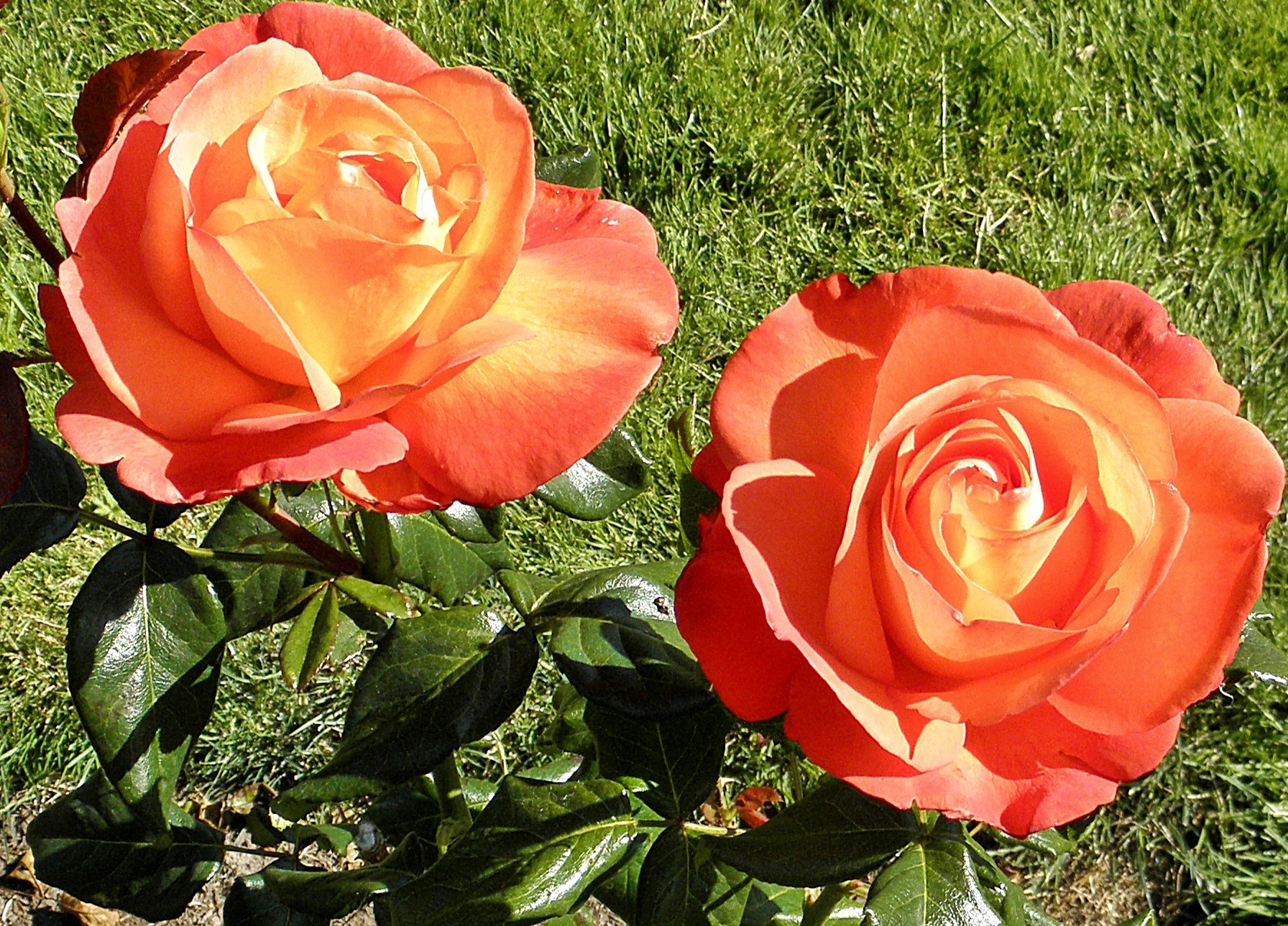
- Rosa 'Voodoo'
- Genus: Rosa hybrid
- Hybrid parentage: ('Camelot' x 'First Prize' x 'Typhoo Tea') x 'Lolita'
- Cultivar group: Hybrid tea
- Cultivar: 'AROmiclea'
- Breeder: Christensen
- Origin: United States, 1984

Rosa 'Voodoo', (a.k.a. AROmiclea), is a hybrid tea rose cultivar, bred by Jack Christensen in 1984. The rose variety was created from the stock parents: grandiflora 'Camelot'; hybrid tea, 'First Prize'; hybrid tea, 'Typhoo Tea'; and hybrid tea, 'Lolita'. The cultivar was named an All-America Rose Selections winner in 1986.

== Description ==
'Voodoo' is a medium-tall upright shrub, 4 to 5 ft (120–150 cm) in height with a 2 to 3 ft (60–90 cm) spread. Blooms have an average diameter of 4-5 in (10-12 cm). Flowers are large and bloom in different shades of orange-pink, yellow, pink and crimson. Flowers have a moderate, sweet fragrance, with large high-centered, cupped petals. Flowers are borne singly on long stems, in small clusters of 26-40 petals. The leaves are healthy, glossy, and dark green in color. The plant is a vigorous grower and a repeat bloomer, and does very well in hot climates. It thrives in USDA zone 7b and warmer.

== Child plants ==
- Rosa 'Anna's Promise', (2013)
- Rosa 'Astor Perry', (2004)
- Rosa 'Chris Evert', (1997)
- Rosa 'Julia Child', (2006)
- Rosa 'Modern Magic', (1996)
- Rosa 'Sunstruck', (2004)
- Rosa 'We Salute You', (2005)

== Awards ==
- All-America Rose Selections winner, USA, (1984)

== See also ==
- Garden roses
- Rose Hall of Fame
- List of Award of Garden Merit roses
