= Rosa 'All American Magic' =

Red blend Grandiflora rose cultivar

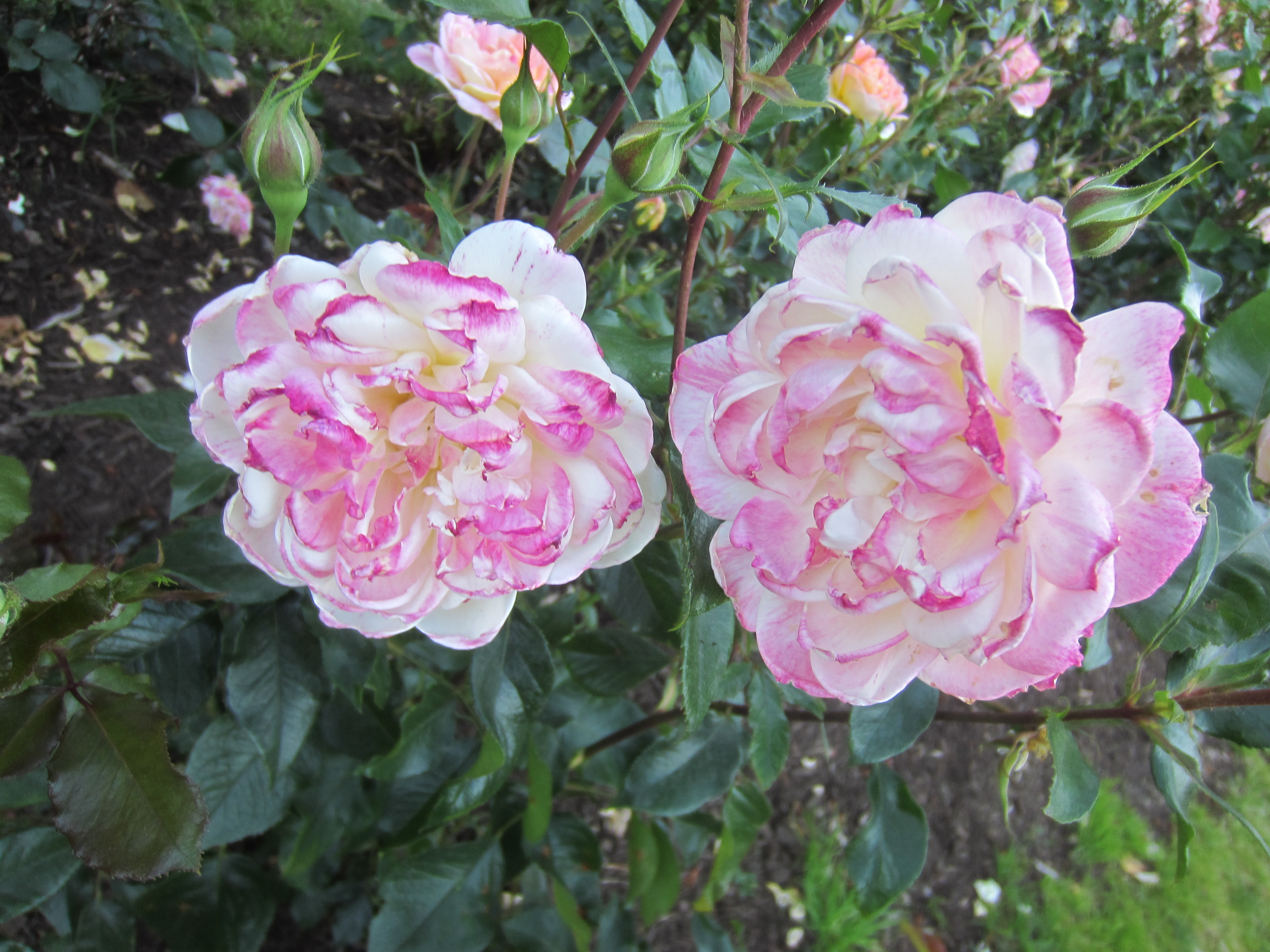
- Rosa 'All American Magic'
- Genus: Rosa hybrid
- Hybrid parentage: (Yakimour x MEIvestal) X Scentimental'
- Cultivar group: Grandiflora, hybrid tea
- Cultivar: 'MEIroylear'
- Marketing names: 'Aina', 'All American Magic', 'All-American Magic'
- Breeder: Alain Meilland
- Origin: France, 1997

Rosa 'All American Magic' (a.k.a. MEIroylear) is a red blend Grandiflora rose cultivar, bred by Alain Meilland in 1997 and introduced into the United States and France by Meilland International.

== Description ==
'All American Magic' is a medium-tall, upright rose, 4 to 6 ft (1.2–1.8 m) in height, with a 2 to 3 ft (0.61–0.91 m) spread. Its flowers are 2 to 3 in (51–76 mm) in diameter, with a very full (40+ petals), rounded bloom form. Flower color is a blend of red, pink, cream and yellow. Flowers are borne singly and in small clusters. The rose has a mild raspberry fragrance and is very disease resistant. Its leaves are glossy and medium green.

== History ==
=== Meilland International ===
The Meilland family is a multi-generational family of French rose breeders. The family's first rosarian was gardener, Joseph Rambaux, who first started breeding roses in 1850 in Lyon. He is best known for developing the Polyantha 'Perle d'Or'. His wife, Claudine and son-in-law, Francois Dubreuil, took over the nursery after Rambaux died in 1878. Dubreuil became a successful rose breeder and grower. In 1900, Dubreuil hired sixteen year old, Antoine Meilland, as a gardening assistant, where he met Dubreuil's daughter, Claudia. Antoine and Claudia married in 1909 and their son, Francis was born in 1912. The couple took over Dubreuil's nursery after his death in 1916.

After World War I, Antoine and Claudia bought property in Tassin-la-Demi-Lune, near Lyon and started a new nursery. Their son, Francis, married Marie-Louise (Louisette) Paolino, daughter of an Italian rose breeder in 1939. Francis expanded the rose business over time into a large, international company, and became the most famous and prolific rose breeder in the family. His legendary 'Peace' rose, brought the family international attention and great commercial success when it was introduced after World War II. The Meilland family merged their business with Francisque Richardier in 1946, so that Francis Meilland could focus solely on breeding roses. After Francis's early death in 1958, Louisette continued to breed roses, introducing many awarding winning new varieties. The new company, Meilland-Richardier grew into Meilland International (AKA House of Meilland), and is located in Le Luc en Provence, France. Francis and Louisette's children, Alain and Michele, are both successful rose breeders for the company. Meilland International continues to be 100% family owned and managed.

=== 'All American Magic' ===
'All American Magic' was developed by Alain Meilland in 1997 by crossing the Floribunda, 'Scentimental' with the resulting seedling of a cross between the hybrid teas, 'Yakimour' and 'MEIvestal'. It was introduced into the United States and France by Meilland International.
