= Rosa 'Abbaye de Cluny' =

Apricot blend hybrid tea rose cultivar

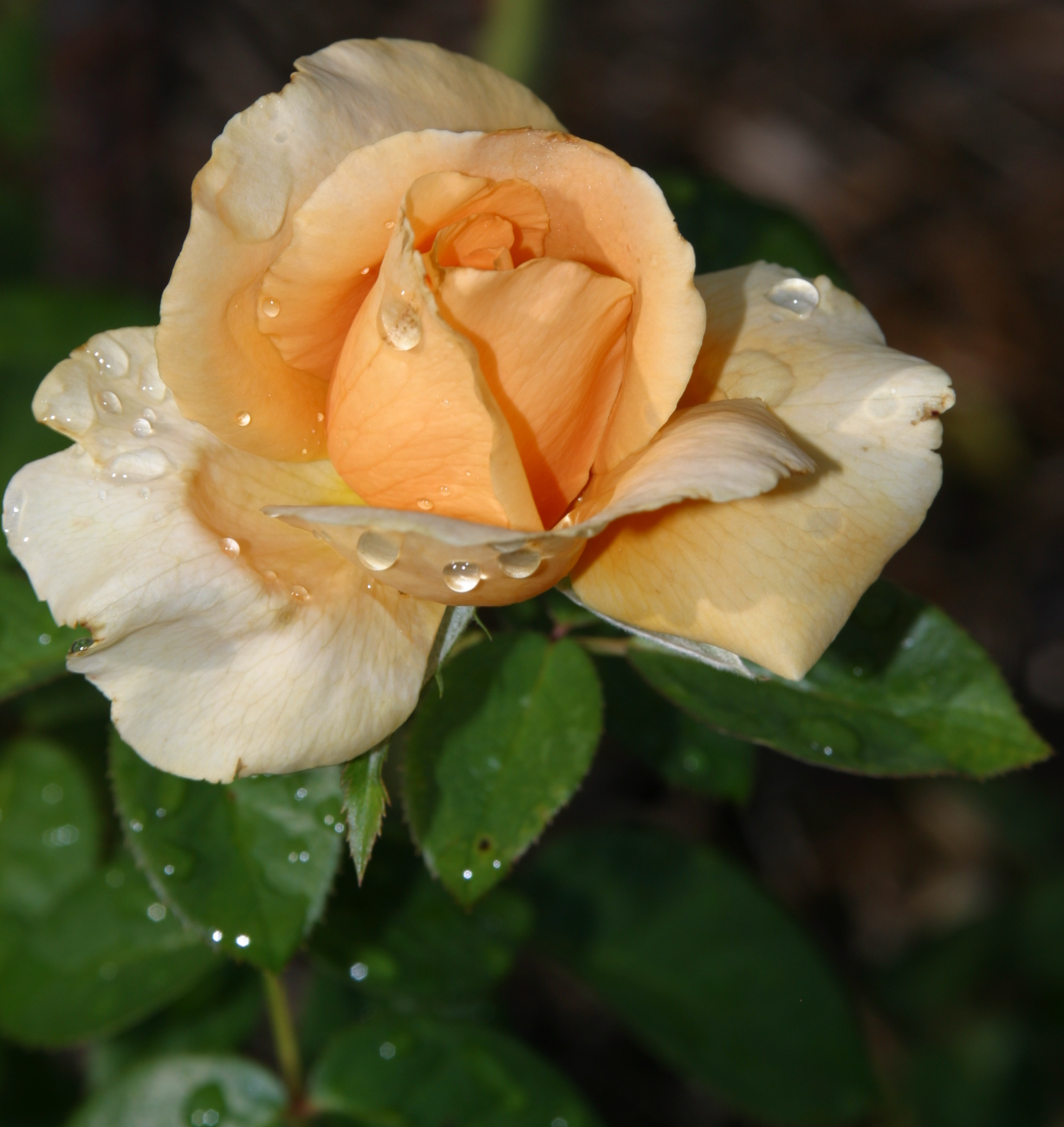
- Rosa 'Abbaye de Cluny'
- Genus: Rosa hybrid
- Hybrid parentage: ('Louis de Funès' x 'Sun King') x 'Just Joey'
- Cultivar group: Hybrid tea
- Cultivar: MEIbrinpay
- Marketing names: 'Fiona Stanley', 'Carla Crosa di Vergagni'
- Breeder: Alain Meilland
- Origin: France, 1995

Rosa 'Abbaye de Cluny' (aka MEIbrinpay) is an apricot blend hybrid tea rose, bred by Alain Meilland before 1993. Meilland International introduced the rose in France in 1995. It is one of Meilland's Romantica rose series. Rosa 'Abbaye de Cluny' won the Belfast Gold Medal in 1995.

== Description ==
'Abbaye de Cluny' is a medium bushy, upright hybrid tea rose, 3 to 4 ft (0.91–1.22 m) in height, with a 2 to 3 ft (0.61–0.91 m) spread. The double flowers have a cabbage-like form and are an apricot-orange color with orange or copper toward the edges. The rose has a mild scent. It has medium, semi-glossy, dark green leaves that are resistant to blackspot. It is very disease resistant. Romantica roses are known for their long bloom cycles from spring to autumn. They are similar to old roses in their colors and traditional fragrances.

== History ==
=== Meilland International ===
The Meilland Family is a multi-generational family of French rose breeders. The family's first rosarian was gardener, Joseph Rambaux, who first started breeding roses in 1850 in Lyon. He is best known for developing the Polyantha 'Perle d'Or'. His wife, Claudine and son-in-law, Francois Dubreuil, took over the nursery after Rambaux died in 1878. Dubreuil became a successful rose breeder and grower. In 1900, Dubreuil hired sixteen year old, Antoine Meilland, as a gardening assistant, where he met Dubreuil's daughter, Claudia. Antoine and Claudia married in 1909 and their son, Francis was born in 1912. The couple took over Dubareuil's nursery after his death in 1916.

After World War I, Antoine and Claudia bought property in Tassin-la-Demi-Lune, near Lyon and started a new nursery. Their son, Francis, married Marie-Louise (Louisette) Paolino, daughter of an Italian rose breeder in 1939. Francis expanded the family business over time into a large, international company, and became the most famous and prolific rose breeder in the family. His legendary 'Peace' rose, brought the family international attention and great commercial success when it was introduced after World War II. The Meilland family merged their business with Francisque Richardier in 1946, so that Francis Meilland could focus solely on breeding roses. After Francis's early death in 1958, Louisette continued to breed roses, introducing many awarding winning new varieties. The new company, Meilland-Richardier grew into Meilland International (AKA House of Meilland), and is located in Le Luc en Provence, France. Francis and Louisette's children, Alain and Michele, are both successful rose breeders and continue to manage the company.

=== 'Abbaye de Cluny' ===
'Abbaye de Cluny' was bred in France by Alain Meilland before 1993. It was introduced in France by Meilland International in 1995. Meilland developed the cultivar by crossing hybrid teas, ('Louis de Funès' x 'Sun King') x'Just Joey'. 'Abbaye de Cluny' won the Belfast Gold Medal in 1995. The rose is named after the Benedictine Abbey at Cluny, Saône-et-Loire, France., France.

== Sources ==
- Harkness, Jack (1985). The Maker of Heavenly Roses. ISBS. ISBN 978-0285626546.
- Quest-Ritson, Brigid; Quest-Ritson, Charles (2003). Encyclopedia of Roses. DK Publishing. ISBN 978-0756688684.
