= Rosa 'Louis de Funès' =

Orange Hybrid tea rose cultivar

Rosa 'MEIrestif'
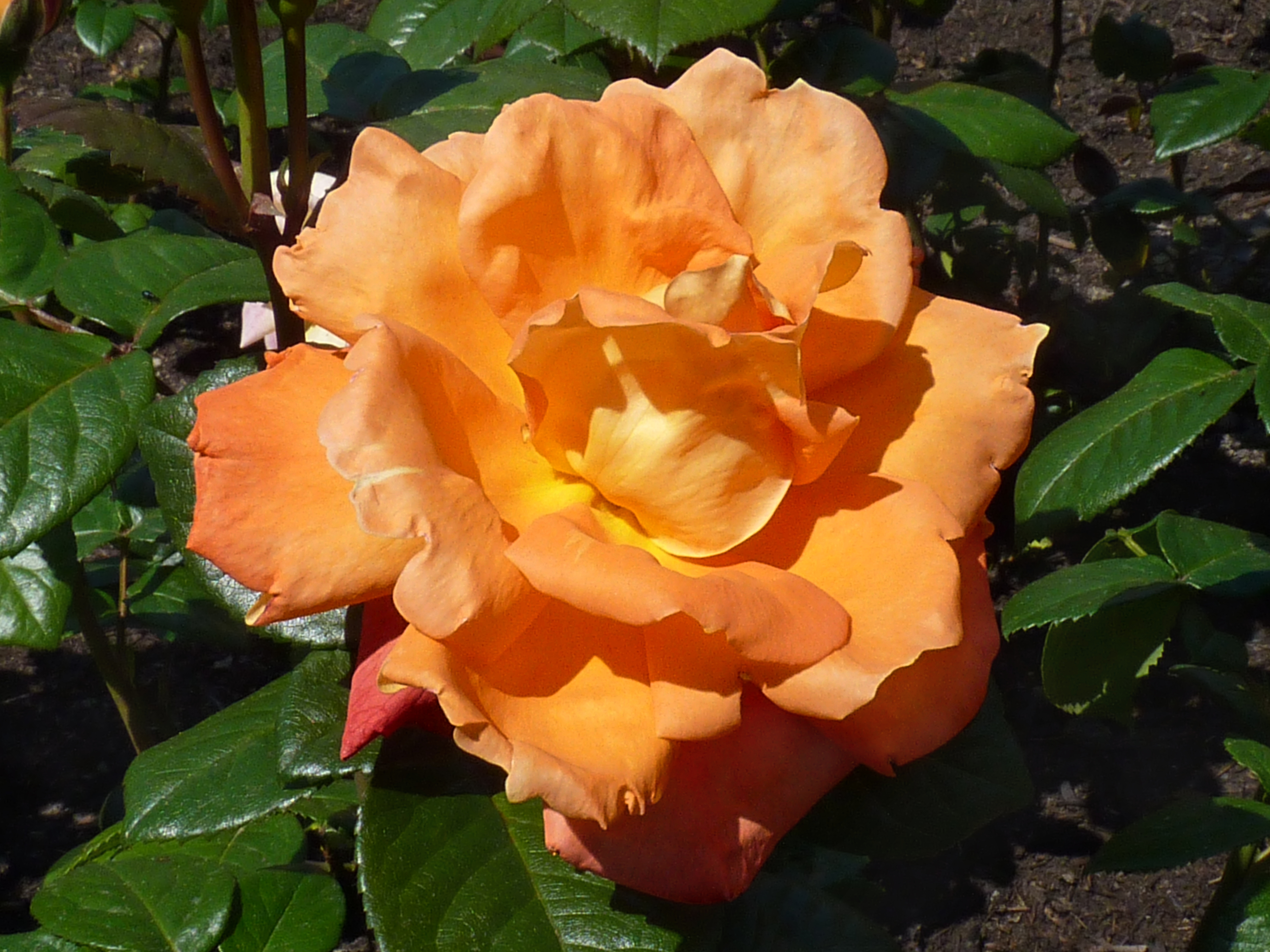
- Genus: Rosa hybrid
- Hybrid parentage: ('Ambassador' x 'Whiskey Mac') x ('Arthur Bell' x 'Kabuki')
- Cultivar group: Hybrid tea
- Cultivar: 'MEIrestif'
- Marketing names: Louis de Funès, Charleston 88
- Breeder: Marie-Louise Meilland
- Origin: France, before 1987

Rosa 'Louis de Funès' (aka MEIrestif) is an orange hybrid tea rose, bred by Marie-Louise Meilland before 1987. Meilland International introduced the rose in France in 1987. It was named after the famous French comedian Louis de Funès(1914 - 1983).

== Description ==
'Louis de Funès' is a medium, upright hybrid tea rose, 32 to 39 in (810–990 mm) in height, with a 2 to 3 ft (0.61–0.91 m) spread. The plant has a large, high-centered, double bloom form and flowers are carried singly carried on long stems. Bloom color is orange-nasturtium with a darker orange at the edges and a yellow-orange base. The backs of petals are yellow. The rose has a light, fruity scent. It has medium green leaves and many prickles It is very disease resistant.

== History ==
=== Meilland International ===
The Meilland Family is a multi-generational family of French rose breeders. The family's first rosarian was gardener, Joseph Rambaux, who first started breeding roses in 1850 in Lyon. He is best known for developing the Polyantha 'Perle d'Or'. His wife, Claudine and son-in-law, Francois Dubreuil, took over the nursery after Rambaux died in 1878. Dubreuil became a successful rose breeder and grower. In 1900, Dubreuil hired sixteen year old, Antoine Meilland, as a gardening assistant, where he met Dubreul's daughter, Claudia. Antoine and Claudia married in 1909 and their son, Francis was born in 1912. The couple took over Dubareuil's nursery after his death in 1916.

After World War I, Antoine and Claudia bought property in Tassin-la-Demi-Lune, near Lyon and started a new nursery. Their son, Francis, married Marie-Louise (Louisette) Paolino, daughter of an Italian rose breeder in 1939. Francis expanded the family business over time into a large, international company, and became the most famous and prolific rose breeder in the family. His legendary 'Peace' rose, brought the family international attention and great commercial success when it was introduced after World War II. The Meilland family merged their business with Francisque Richardier in 1946, so that Francis Meilland could focus solely on breeding roses. After Francis's early death in 1958, Louisette continued to breed roses, introducing many awarding winning new varieties. The new company, Meilland-Richardier grew into Meilland International (AKA House of Meilland), and is located in Le Luc en Provence, France. Francis and Louisette's children, Alain and Michele, are both successful rose breeders and continue to manage the company.

=== 'Louis de Funès' ===
'Louis de Funès' was bred in France by Marie-Louise "Louisette" Meilland before 1987. It was introduced in France by Meilland International in 1987. Meilland developed the cultivar by crossing hybrid teas, ('Ambassador' x 'Whiskey Mac') x ('Arthur Bell' x 'Kabuki'). 'Louis de Funès' The rose is named after the comedian Louis de Funès (July 31, 1914 - Jan. 27, 1983). It has four child plants: 'Abbaye de Cluny', 'Betty White', 'Duftjuwel', and 'Line Renaud'.
