= The Meilland Family =

French rose breeders

The Meilland Family is a multi-generational family of French rose breeders. The family's first rosarian was gardener, Joseph Rambaux, who first started breeding roses in 1850 in Lyon. He is best known for developing the Polyantha 'Perle d'Or'. His wife, Claudine and son-in-law, Francois Dubreuil, took over the nursery after Rambaux died in 1878. Dubreuil became a successful rose breeder and grower. In 1900, Dubreuil hired sixteen year old, Antoine Meilland, as a gardening assistant, where he met Dubreuil's daughter, Claudia. Antoine and Claudia married in 1909 and their son, Francis was born in 1912. The couple took over Dubreuil's nursery after his death in 1916.

After World War I, Antoine and Claudia bought property in Tassin-la-Demi-Lune, near Lyon and started a new nursery. Their son, Francis, married Marie-Louise (Louisette) Paolino, daughter of an Italian rose breeder in 1939. Francis expanded the rose business over time into a large, international company, and became the most famous and prolific rose breeder in the family. His legendary 'Peace' rose, brought the family international attention and great commercial success when it was introduced after World War II. The Meilland family merged their business with Francisque Richardier in 1946, so that Francis Meilland could focus solely on breeding roses. After Francis's early death in 1958, Louisette continued to breed roses, introducing many awarding winning new varieties. The new company, Meilland-Richardier grew into Meilland International (AKA House of Meilland), and is located in Le Luc en Provence, France. Francis and Louisette's children, Alain and Michele, are both successful rose breeders and continue to manage the company.

== History ==
=== Joseph Rambaux ===
Rose breeding in the Meilland family began with Joseph Rambaux (1820–1878), a gardener at Parc de la Tête d'Or. He became interested in growing his own roses in 1850. He later began crossing roses planted in the legendary gardens. Rambaux died in 1878 and left his roses to his wife Claudine, daughter Marie and son-in-law, Louis-Francois (Francis) Dubrueil (1842–1916). Claudine Rambaux introduced eight new rose varieties under the name of "Veuve Rambaux", including tea rose, 'Souvenir du rosiériste Rambaux' (1883) and Hybrid Perpetual, 'Madame Rambeaux' (1894). Two new Joseph Rambaux roses introduced by Dubreuil were polyanthas 'Perle d'Or' (1883), and 'Anna Maria de Montravel' (1897).

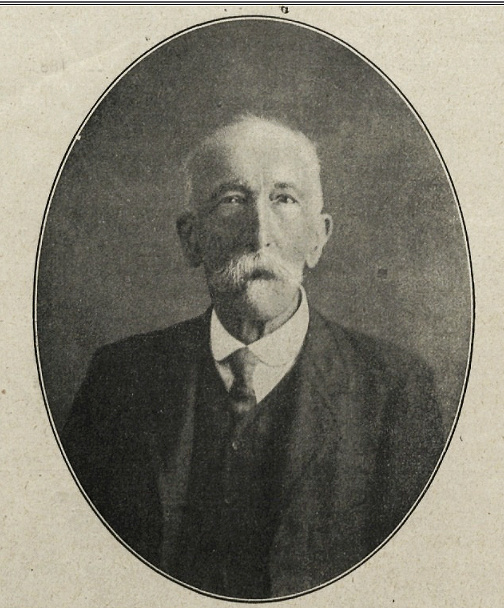
Francis Dubreuil

=== Francis Dubreuil ===
Francis Dubreuil (1842–1916) was the second generation of the Meilland family to breed and grow roses. Dubreuil quit his job as tailor to take over the management of the family rose-breeding business in 1880. During his career, from 1880 and 1914, Dubreuil introduced 64 rose varieties. He expanded the number and roses grown at the nursery and printed his first annual catalog in 1867. In 1887, he developed 'Pearl of Gold', and apricot Polyantha that was almost thornless. 'Pearl of Gold' was the first rose variety the family introduced that had an international impact. It was a very popular and commercially successful rose. Some of his most successful rose cultivars include China rose, 'Jean Bach-Sisley' (1891), hybrid tea, 'Francis Debreuil' (1897), Noisette, 'Crépuscule' (1904), and, polyantha 'Mme Francisque Favre' (1915). During his career, he established the French Society of rose growers and was an "officier du Mérite agricole". (Order of Agricultural Merit)

=== Antoine Meilland ===
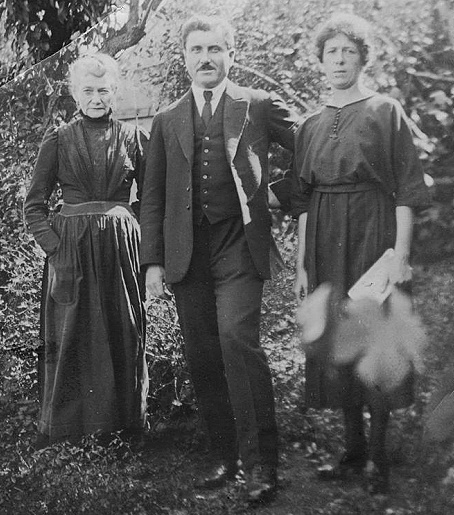
Grand'mere Jenny, Antoine, and Claudia Meilland

Antoine ('Papa') Meilland (1884–1971) was born in 1884 on a small farm in Chambœuf, France. He was the youngest of four children. A neighbor, Madame Meviere, introduced Antoine to his first rose, Rosa 'Noisettiana' ,(1814), which had just started blooming in her garden. From that moment on, he dedicated himself to learning as much as he could about the world of roses. He borrowed Madame Meviere's rose catalogues of Francis Debreuil and learned how to bud roses from his kind neighbor. By the age of twelve, he decided that he wanted to grow roses, so he quit school and took a job at a local arborist where he learned grafting working with apple trees. He worked as a nursery worker until he was sixteen and he was then hired as a gardener's assistant at Francis Debreuil's nursery. There he fell in love with Debreuil's daughter and gardening assistant, Claudia, and they married in 1909. Their son, Francis (Francois) was born in 1912.

Antoine was inducted in the French army when France entered the War in 1914. Claudia was left to manage the family farm on her own. She transitioned from growing roses to growing vegetables to support her family during the war. Antoine returned to Lyon in 1919. The family later moved to Tassin-la-Demi-Lune near Lyon, where the soil was better for rose growing. Antoine and Claudia bought 1.5 hectares (3.7 acres) of land and a house. He planted twenty thousand rootstocks, and lost the entire crop to an invasion of root eating maybugs The rose nursery slowly recovered during the 1920s, as Francis was learning from Antoine about the rose business.

=== Francis Meilland ===
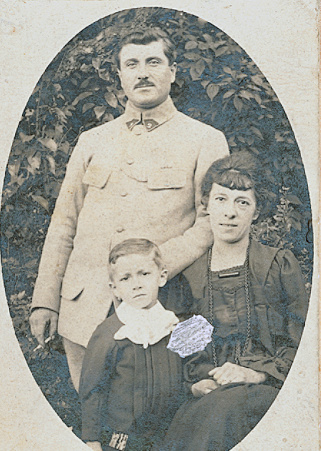
Francis Meilland, center, with Antoine and Claudia Meilland, c. 1919

Francis Meilland (1912— 1958) was born on February 20, 1912, in Lyon. His parents, Antoine and Louisette Meilland were working for his grandfather, Francis Dubreuil's rose nursery in Lyon at the time of his birth. In 1914, Antoine was drafted into the French army in 1914, and when he returned in 1919, Antoine and Claudia had inherited Dubreuil's nursery, after Dubreuil had died in 1916. they later moved to Tassin-la-Demi-Lune to expand their rose growing business. Francis showed a strong interest in roses as a child. He worked with his father in the nursery from age of fourteen. On one of their business trips in 1932, Francis and Antoine met with one of his father's clients, the rose breeder Francesco Paolina and his wife Marie-Elizabeth. During this trip Francis met their daughter, Louisette, who would later marry Francis.

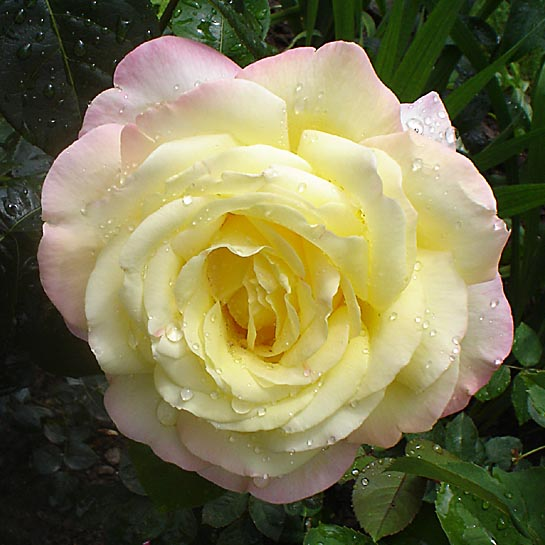
'Peace' rose, 1945

Francis is best remembered for developing the legendary 'Peace' rose in 1939. The new rose variety was introduced in 1945 and was a tremendous commercial success. In 1946, the Meilland family sold a majority of their business to rosarian and business owner, Francisque Richardier, so that Francis could devote himself solely to breeding roses. The new company became the Meilland-Richardier company. The nursery business became Meilland-Richardier under the management of the Richardier. Francis Meilland died in 1958, after having established a large, successful international business. Besides his world famous 'Peace Rose', Francis, developed over 140 rose varieties during his career. Some of his most popular roses include, 'Alain' (1940), 'Michele Meilland' (1948), 'Monte Carlo' (1949), 'Concerto' (1953), and 'Baccará' (1954).

=== Marie-Louise Meilland ===
Marie Louise (Louisette) Meilland (1920–1987), was born Marie Louise (Louisette) Paolino in Antibes in 1920. She was the daughter of Francesco and Marie-Elisabeth Paolino. Her father grew greenhouses roses and owned a school on roses on the Cap d'Antibes peninsula. Louisette worked with her father from an early age. With her father's guidance, Louisette bred her first rose hybrids at the age of fifteen. She met her future husband, Francis Meilland, at a meeting between their fathers, both rose growers in 1932, when she was twelve years old.. The couple became engaged in 1938, and married on January 14, 1939. Francis and Louisette started a nursery in Tassin-la-Demi-Lune near Lyon. Louisette took on the role of administrator for the nursery. She collaborated with Francis xxxxx. They had two children Alain born in 1940 and Michele, born in 1943.

Working alongside her husband, Louisette developed more than 120 new rose varieties over her multi-decade career. She focused on hybrid teas, floribundas and climbing roses. Some of her most successful rose varieties include 'Pink Panther', 'Marie Callas' and the 'Princess of Monaco'. Louisette was not interested in naming a rose after herself, but her family wanted to honor her and named one of her new rose cultivars, 'Manou Meilland', (1979) 'Manou', the German name for grandmother, and the nickname Louiette's grandchildren affectionately called her. She retired from the business in 1986 and died in early spring, 1987.

=== Alain Meilland ===
Alain Meilland (born 1940) is the son of Francis and Louisette Meilland. He and his mother took over management of the company after Francis died in 1958. The Meilland organization has grown in a large international business under the management of Alain and Louisette. They expanded their production of roses for the cut flower trade and Alain set up trial nurseries for cut roses in France and The Netherlands. Alain developed over 350 rose varieties during his career. Some of his most popular roses are: 'Abbaye de Cluny', 'Sweet Spirit', 'Gilded Sun', 'Papa Meilland', 'Apricot Drift', 'Carefree Wonder' and 'Francis Meilland'

Alain published a book about his family in 1969, La Vie en Roses. It was re-released in English in 1984 as Meilland: A Life in Roses. New York, NY - World-renowned rosarian and breeder of the Drift rose series, Alain Meilland, head of Meilland International, was honored at the annual Great Rosarians of the World (GROW) event earlier this month in New York City. In 2012, Alain was awarded the Great Rosarian of the World (GROW) award, which is presented each year in New York City.

=== Michele Meilland Richardier ===
Michele Meilland Richardier (born 1943) is the daughter of Francis and Louisette Meilland and the sister of Alain Meillaind. She married Raymond Richardier (b. 1933) on April 8, 1961. She has managed the family business with Alain and has developed over 90 roses during her career. Some of her most popular rose varieties are: 'Botticelli', 'Petit Trianon', 'Jubilé du Prince de Monaco', and 'Sunshine Daydream'.

== House of Meilland ==
Meilland Richardier grew into the large rose growing business, the House of Meilland. The company's headquarters are located in Le Luc en Provence, France. The company is owned entirely by the Meilland and Richardier families. The House of Meilland, has three divisions: Meilland International, which creates new rose varieties; Meilland Richardier, which grows and sells commercial roses worldwide; and Selection New Plant (SNP), which finds and acquires innovative varieties of ornamental plants.

The company employs over 800 people worldwide and owns rose trial gardens and test stations in France, the U.S. and Germany. Meilland International sells over 12 million rose plants each year. The company is managed by Alain Meilland and Michell Richardier Meilland, who are also rose breeders for Meilland International. The company's rose breeding program has been led by Jacques Mouchotte since 1978.

== Selected Roses ==
- 'Perle d'Or', Polyantha, Joseph Rambaux, 1883
- 'Madame Rambaux', Hybrid perpetual|, Claudine Rambaux, (1894)
- 'Crépuscule', Noisette, Francis Debreuil (1904)
- 'Peace', Hybrid tea, Francois Meilland, 1945
- 'Alain', Floribunda, Francois Meilland, 1946
- 'Michele Meilland', Hybrid tea, Francois Meilland, 1948
- 'Tahiti', Hybrid tea, Francois Meilland, 1948
- 'Papa Meilland', Hybrid tea, Alain Meilland, 1963
- 'Pink Wonder', Floribunda, Alain Meilland, 1970
- 'Bonica 82', Shrub rose, Louisette Meilland, 1982
- 'Pierre Ronsard', Climbing rose, Louisette Meilland/Jacques Mouchotte, 1985
- 'Abbaye de Cluny', Hybrid tea, Alaine Meilland, 1995
- 'Francis Meilland', Hybrid tea, Alain Meilland, 1997
- 'All American Magic', Grandiflora, Alain Meilland, 1997
- 'Marmalade Skies', Floribunda, Alain Meilland, 2001
- 'Paul Ricard', Hybrid tea, Jacques Mouchotte, 1993

== Rose gallery ==
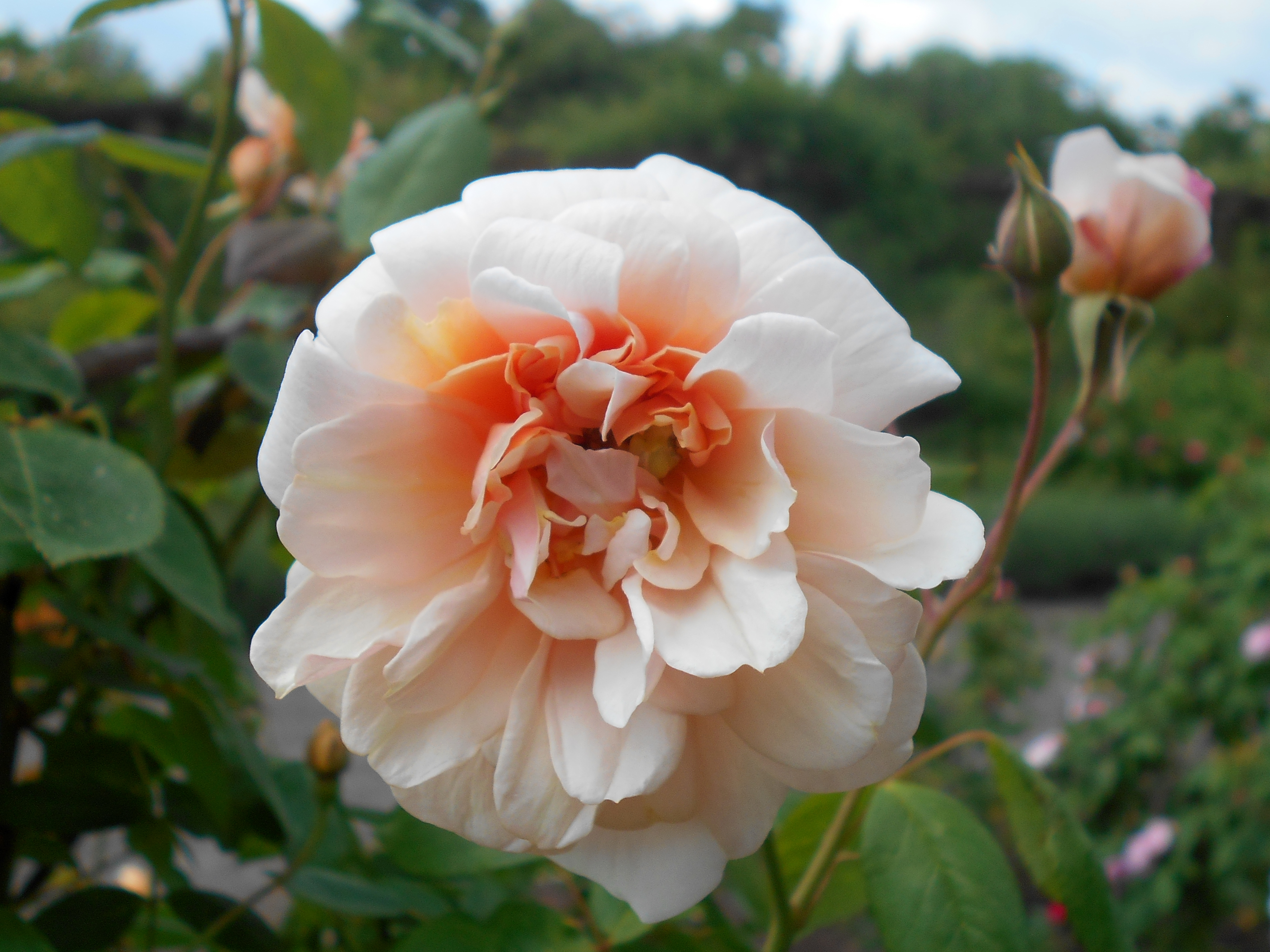
'Perle d'Or', (1883)

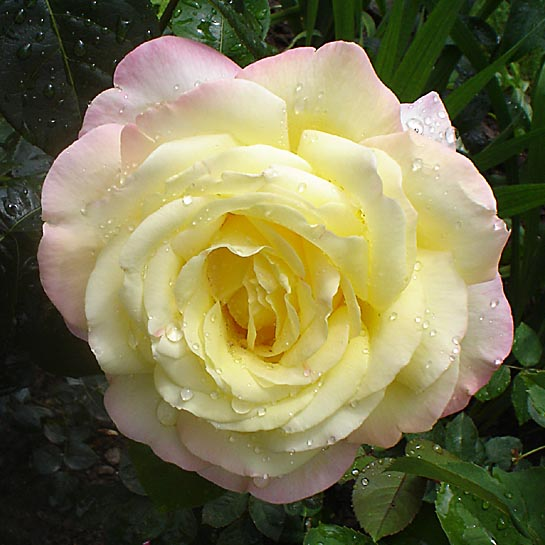
'Peace', (1942)

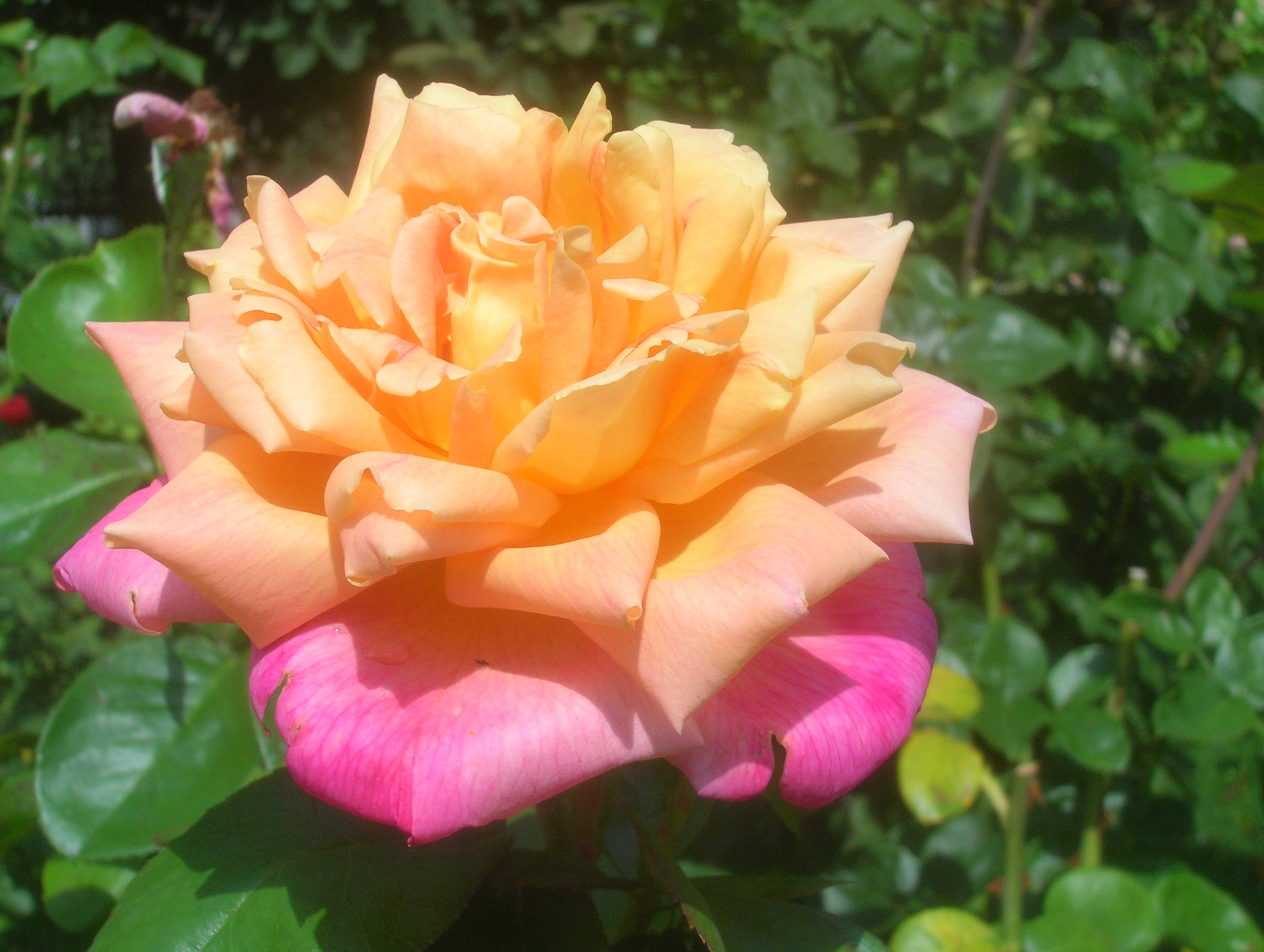
'Tahiti', (1948)

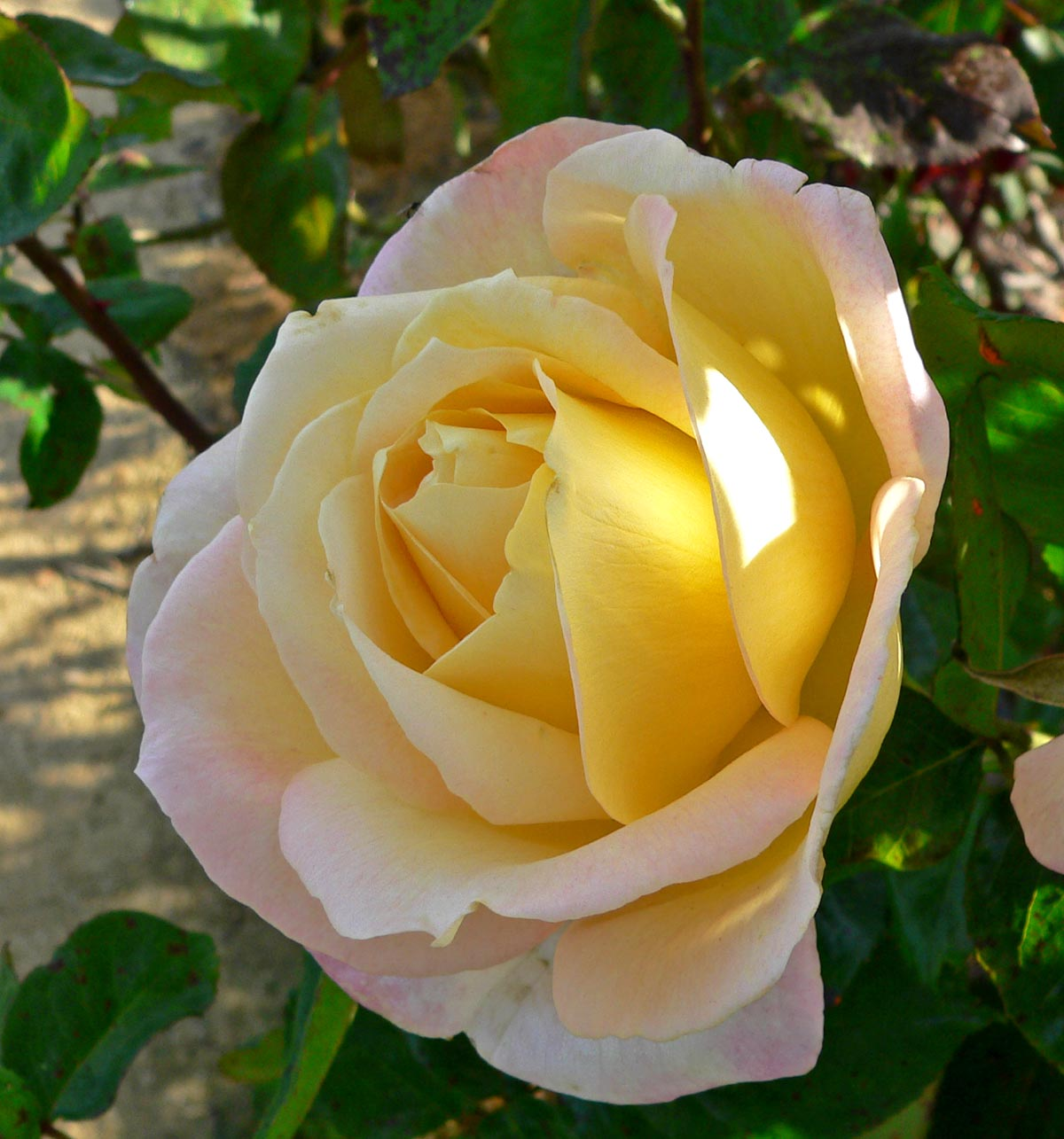
'Grand'mère Jenny', (1950)

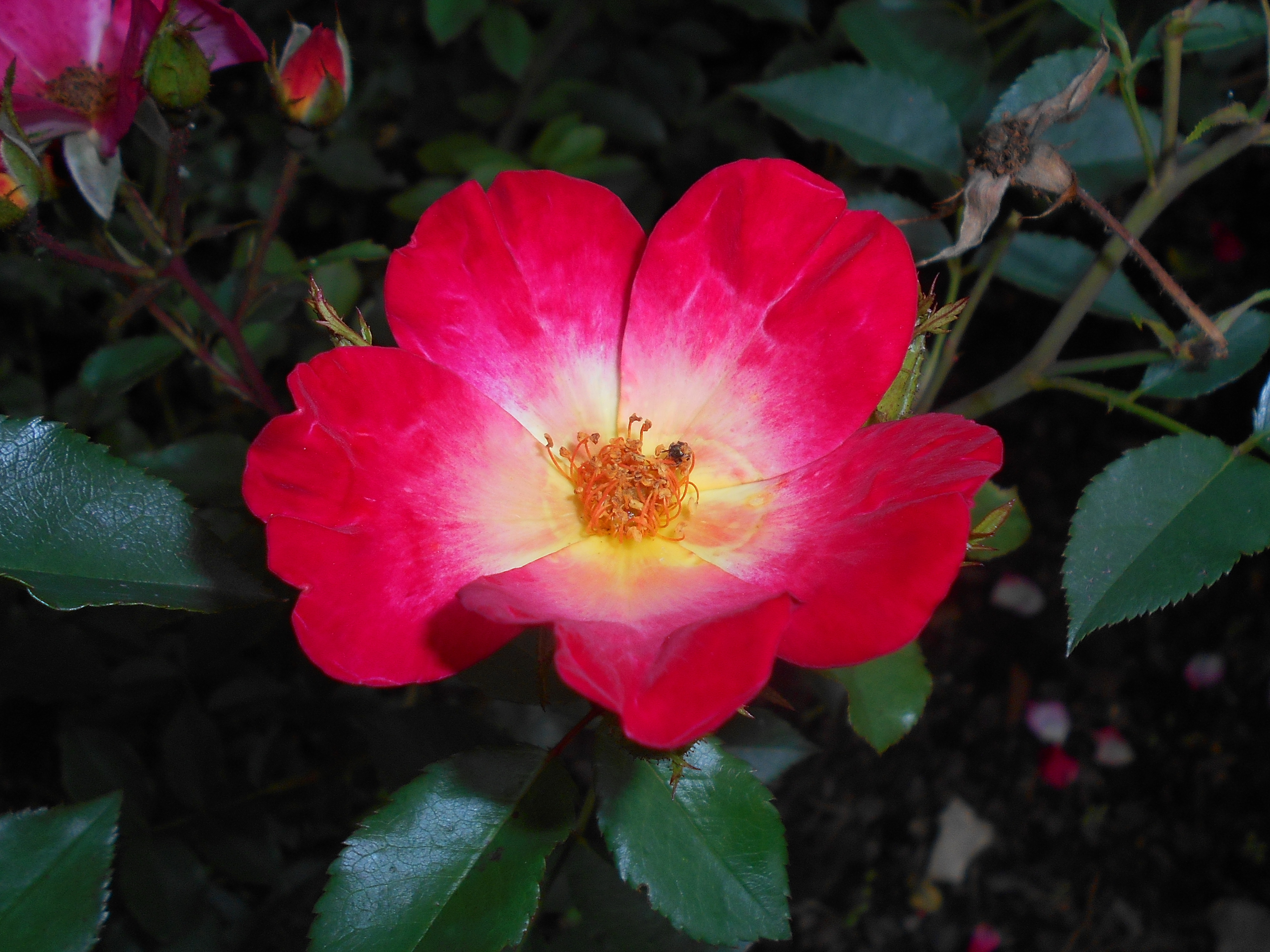
'Cocktail', (1957)

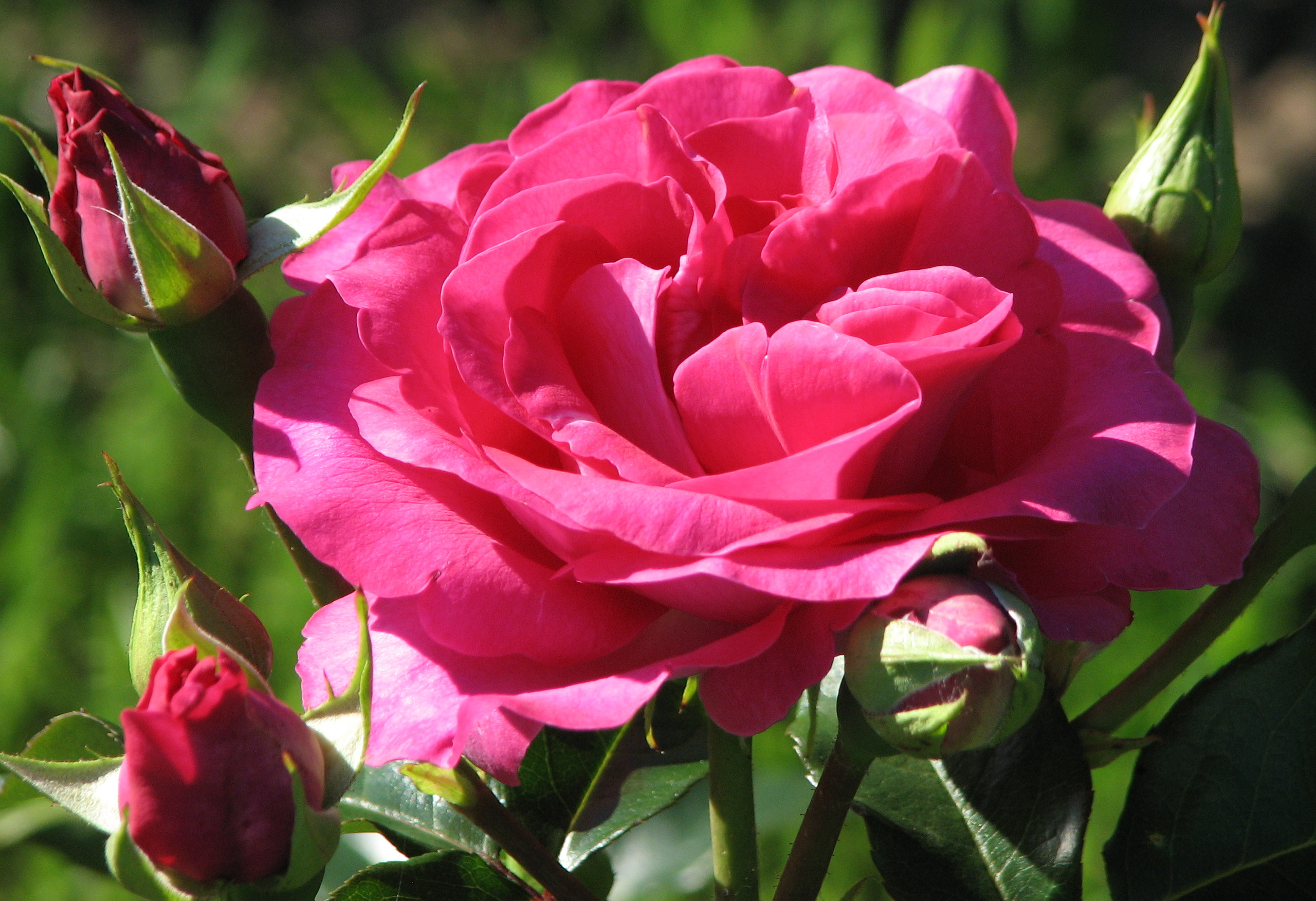
'Manou Meilland' (1979)

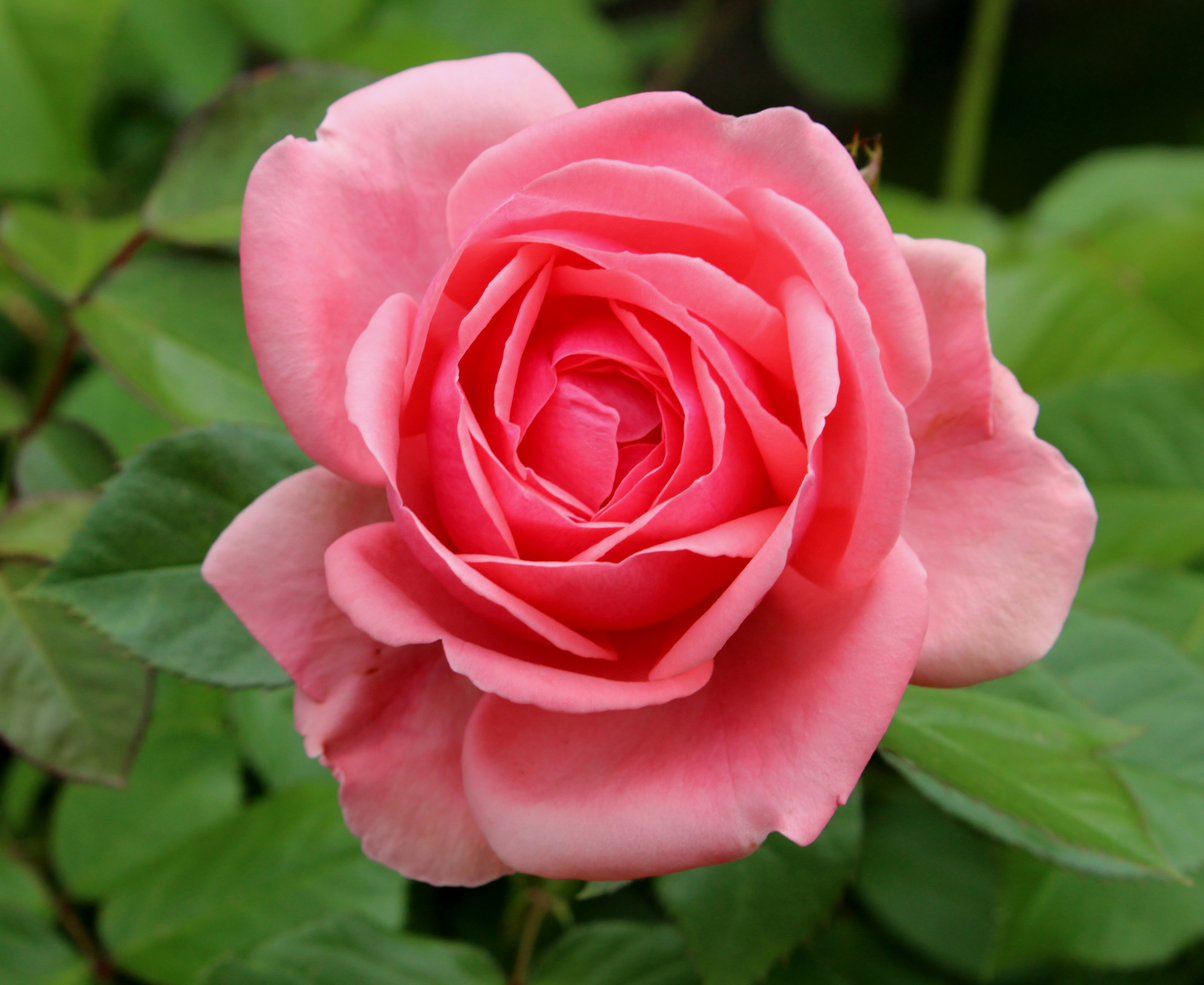
'Johann Strauss', (1994)

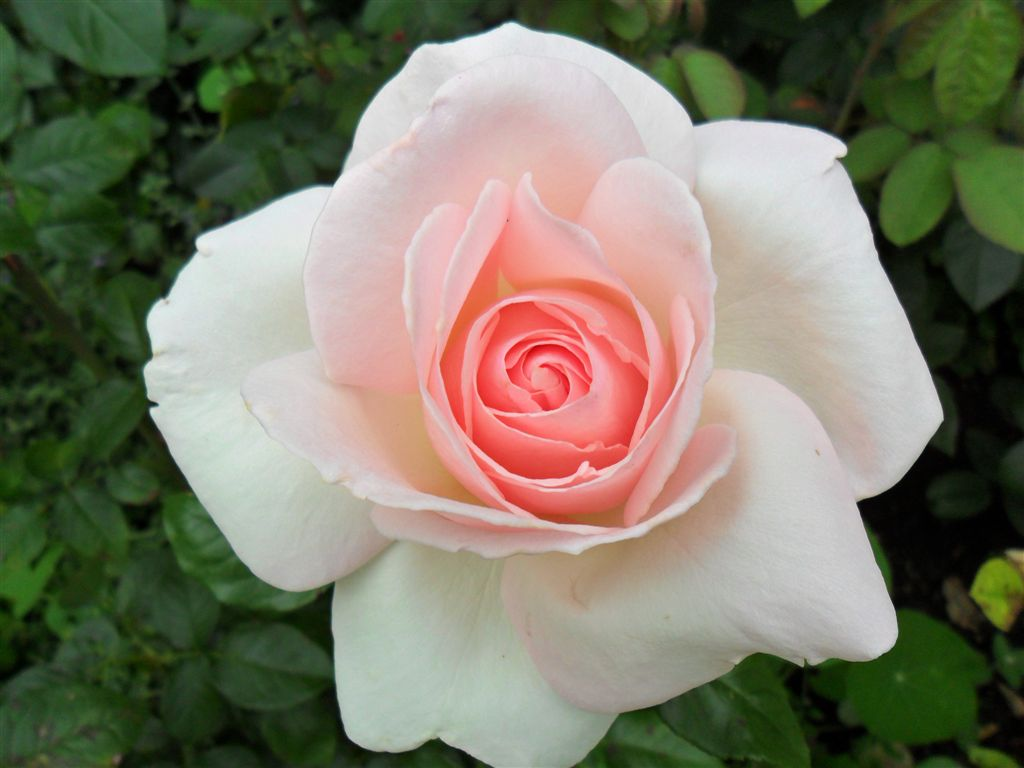
'Francis Meilland', (1997)

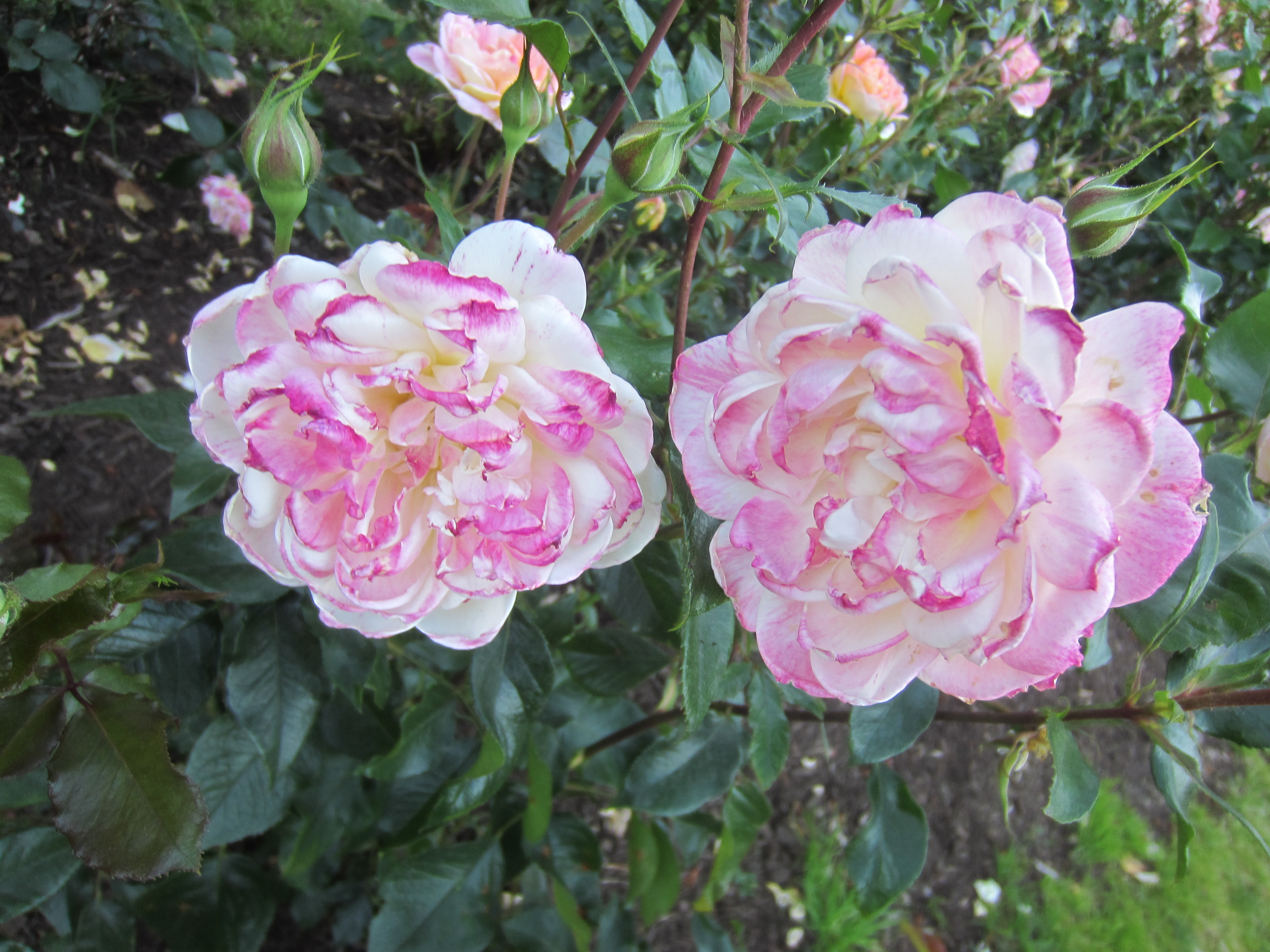
'All American Magic', (1997)

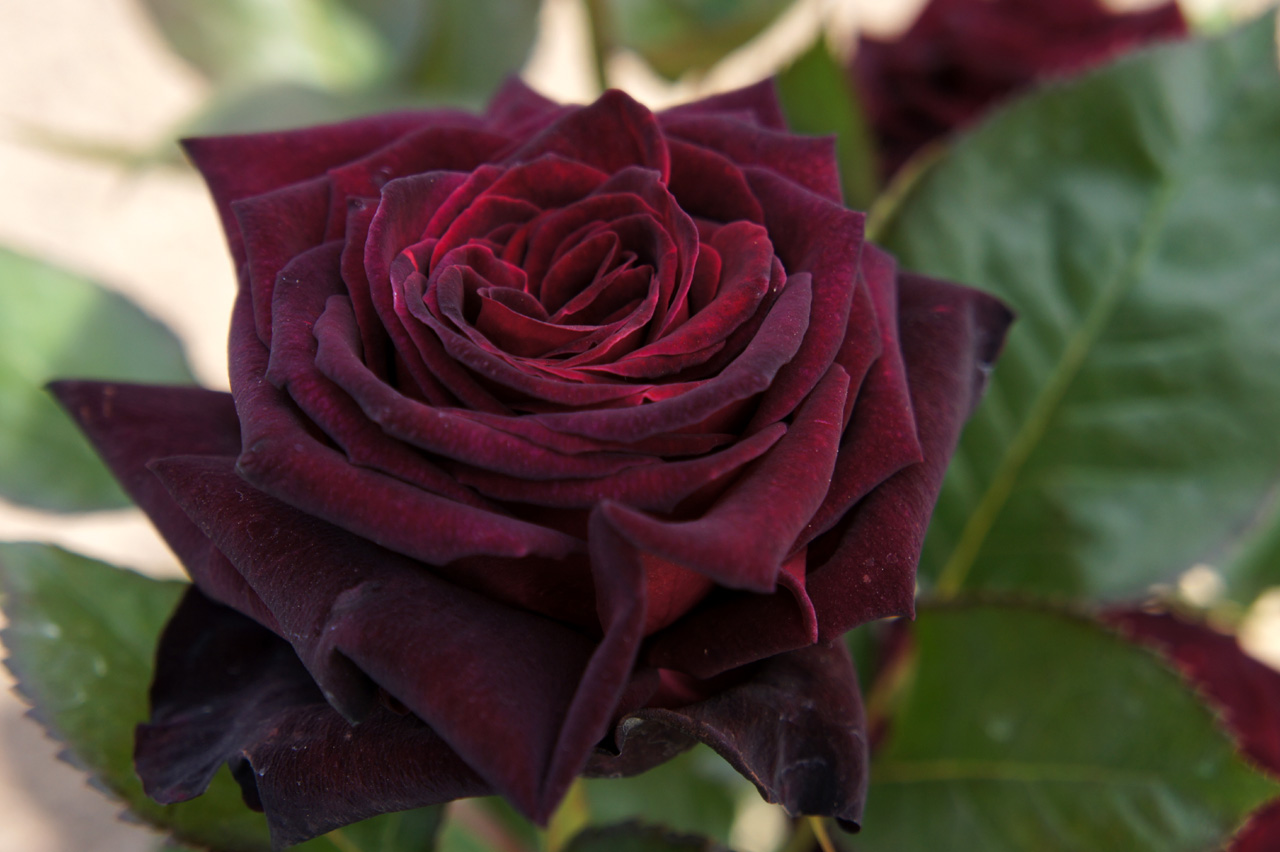
'Black Baccara', (2000)

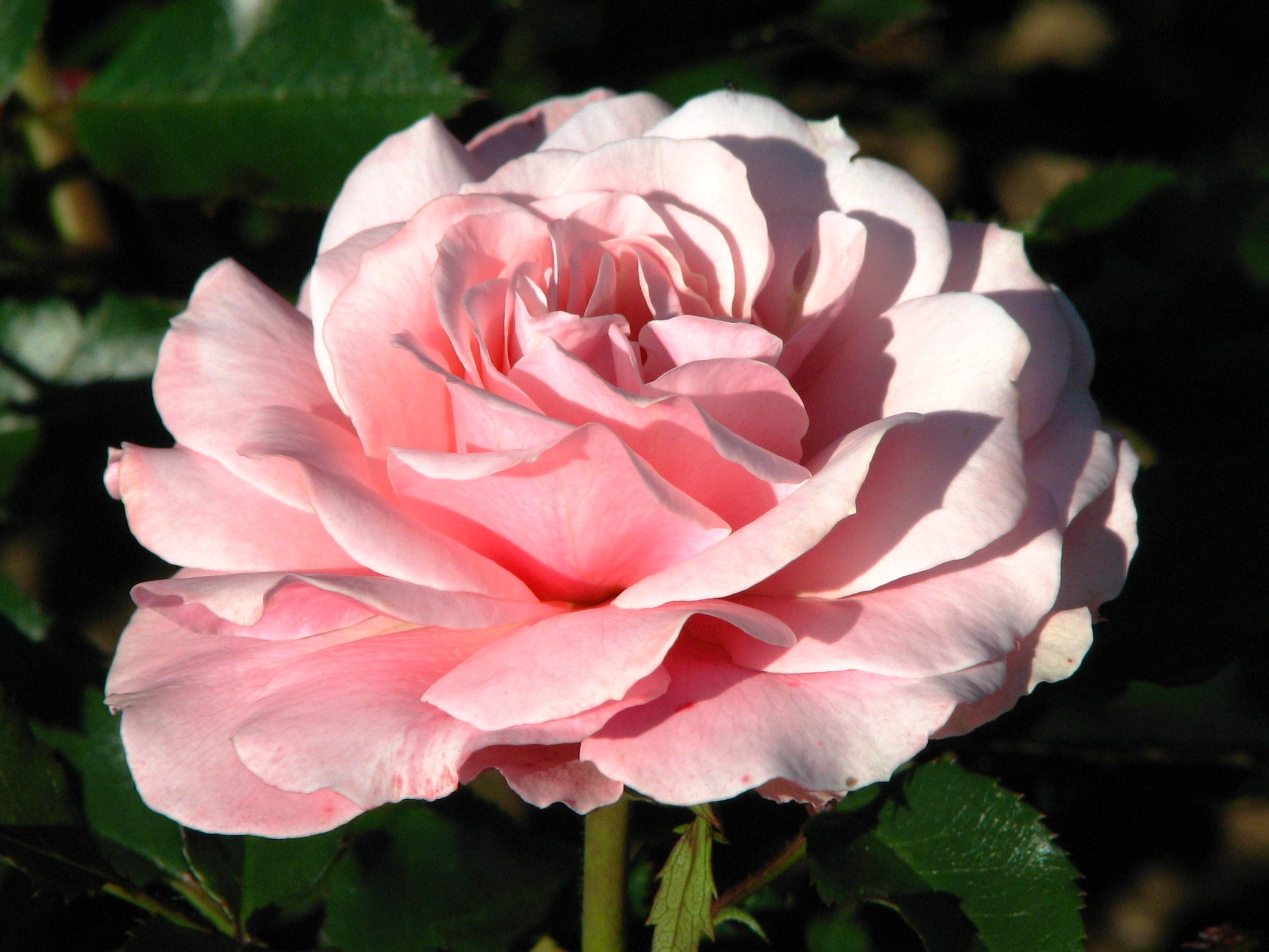
'Botticelli' (2005)

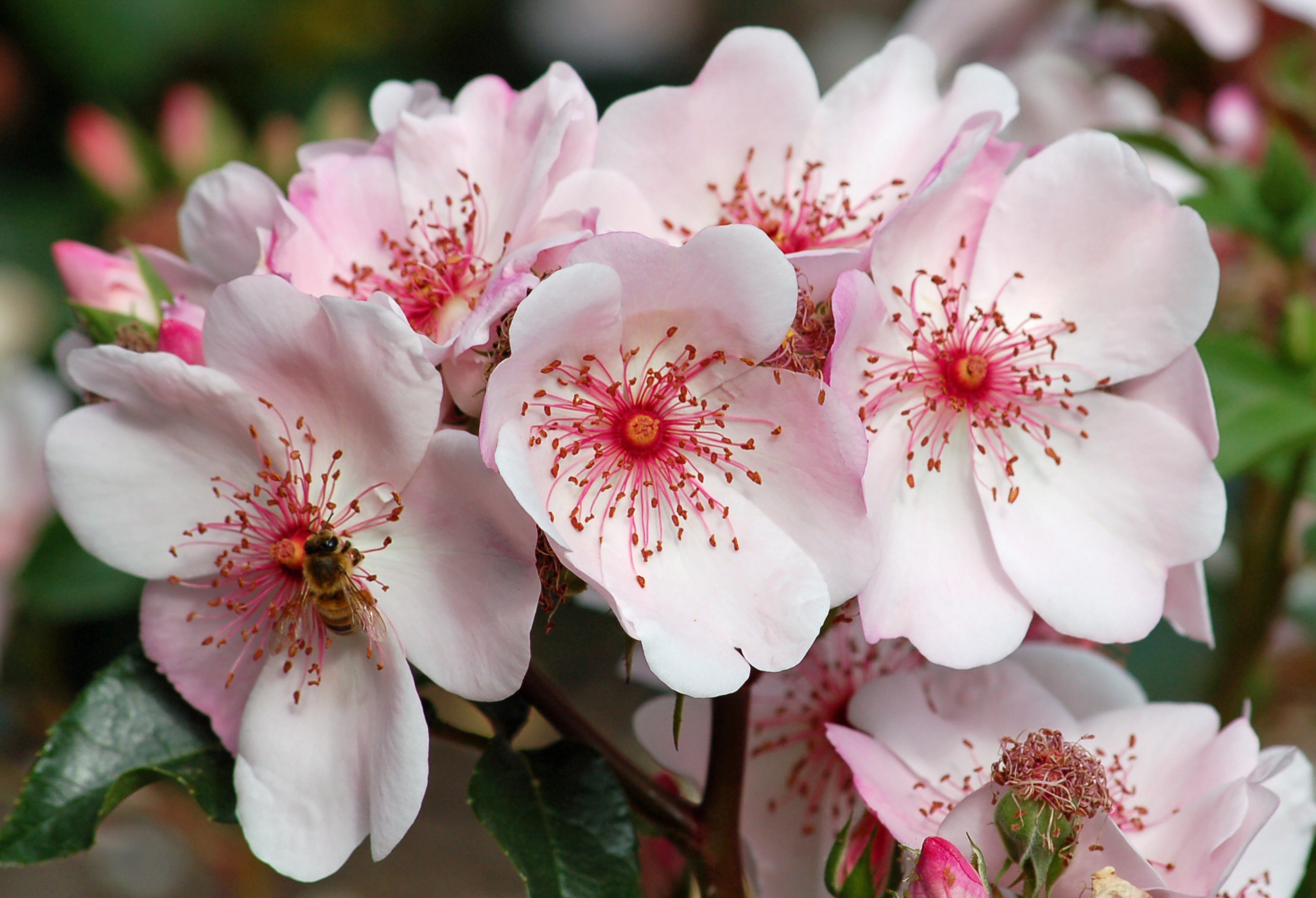
'Astronomia', (2006)

== Sources ==
- Dickerson, Brent C (1992). The Old Rose Advisor. Portland, Oregon: Timber Press. ISBN 978-0-88192-216-5.
- Phillips, Roger (1993). Quest for the Rose: A Historical Guide to Roses. Random House. ISBN 978-0679435730.
- Quest-Ritson, Brigid; Quest-Ritson, Charles (2003). Encyclopedia of Roses. DK Publishing. ISBN 978-0756688684.
