= Rosa 'Alain' =

Red Floribunda rose cultivar

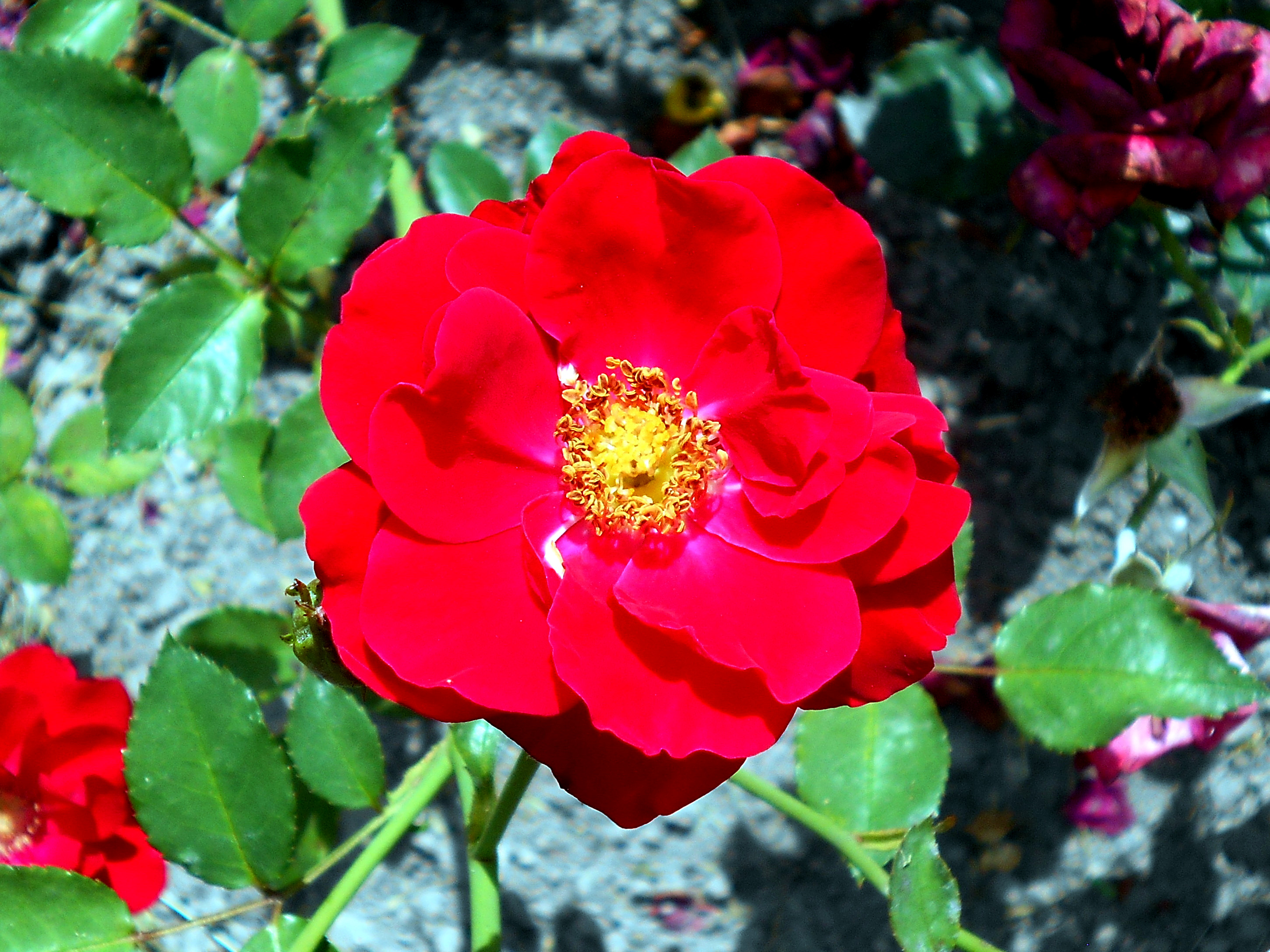
- Genus: Rosa hybrid
- Hybrid parentage: ('Guinée' × 'Wilhelm') × 'Orange Triumph'
- Breeder: Francis Meilland
- Origin: Meilland International, France, 1948

Rosa 'Alain' is a red Floribunda rose variety, bred by Francis Meilland before 1946. Meilland International introduced the rose in France in 1948. It was named for Meilland's son, Alain, who was born in 1940. It won the Geneva Gold Medal in 1948.

== Description ==
'Alain' is a bushy, upright hybrid tea rose, 3 to 5 ft (0.91–1.52 m)in height, with a 2 to 3 ft (0.61–0.91 m) spread. Bloom size is 4 in (100 mm). It has a semi-double (17-25 petals) bloom form.. The flowers are bright red and open relatively flat, which exposes the bright yellow stamens to view. Blooms occur in open clusters, up to as many as nine, and bloom repeatedly throughout the season.

== History ==
=== Meilland International ===
The Meilland family is a multi-generational family of French rose breeders. The family's first rosarian was gardener, Joseph Rambaux, who first started breeding roses in 1850 in Lyon. He is best known for developing the Polyantha 'Perle d'Or'. His wife, Claudine and son-in-law, Francois Dubreuil, took over the nursery after Rambaux died in 1878. Dubreuil became a successful rose breeder and grower. In 1900, Dubreuil hired sixteen year old, Antoine Meilland, as a gardening assistant, where he met Dubreuil's daughter, Claudia. Antoine and Claudia married in 1909 and their son, Francis was born in 1912. The couple took over Dubreuil's nursery after his death in 1916.

After World War I, Antoine and Claudia bought property in Tassin-la-Demi-Lune, near Lyon and started a new nursery. Their son, Francis, married Marie-Louise (Louisette) Paolino, daughter of an Italian rose breeder in 1939. Francis expanded the rose business over time into a large, international company, and became the most famous and prolific rose breeder in the family. His legendary 'Peace' rose, brought the family international attention and great commercial success when it was introduced after World War II. The Meilland family merged their business with Francisque Richardier in 1946, so that Francis Meilland could focus solely on breeding roses. After Francis's early death in 1958, Louisette continued to breed roses, introducing many awarding winning new varieties. The new company, Meilland-Richardier grew into Meilland International (AKA House of Meilland), and is located in Le Luc en Provence, France. Francis and Louisette's children, Alain and Michele, are both successful rose breeders for the company. Meilland International continues to be 100% family owned and managed.

=== 'Alain' ===
'Alain' was developed by Francis Meilland, a French rose breeder from the prominent Meilland family. The rose was introduced in 1948, and named for the breeder's son, Alain Meilland, who was born in 1940. 'Alain' was developed from a cross of 'Guinée' and'Wilhelm', in turn crossed with'Orange Triumph'. 'Alain' was selected as Most Beautiful French Rose (Plus Belle Rose de France) at the Lyon Rose Trials in 1946. In 1948 another gold medal was won at the Geneva Rose Trials. The climbing sport of 'Alain', 'Climbing Alain' was introduced in 1957.
