= Francis Meilland =

French horticulturalist (1912–1958)

- Born: Francois Meilland; February 20, 1912; Lyon, France
- Died: June 15, 1958 (aged 46); Antibes
- Other names: Francois Meilland
- Occupations: Rose breeder business owner
- Known for: 'Peace' rose
- Spouse: Marie-Louise Meilland

Francis Meilland (February 20, 1912— June 15, 1958) was a French rose breeder and co-founder of Meilland International, a family-owned rose growing company in southern France. The Meilland family has been breeding and selling roses since 1850. Francis Meilland is best known for developing the legendary Hybrid tea rose, 'Peace', in the 1930s. Since the rose's introduction in the U.S. in 1945, over 40 million 'Peace' roses have been sold worldwide.

== Biography ==
=== The Meilland family ===
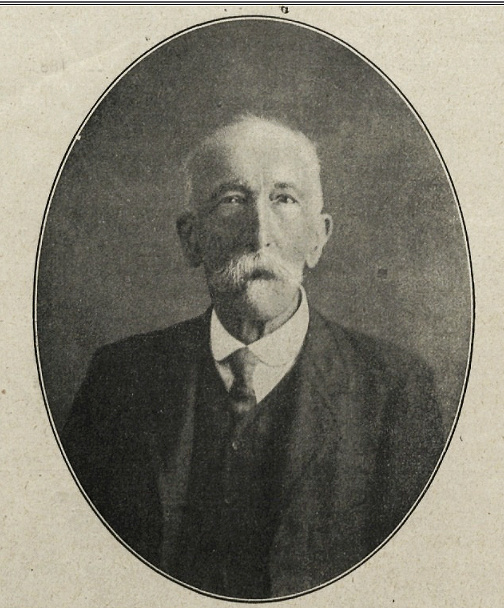
Francis Dubreuil

Francis Meilland is the most celebrated member of the six generation, Meilland family of French rose breeders and nursery owners. The family's rosarian origins began in 1850 with Francis's great-grandfather, Joseph Rambaux, a gardener at Parc de la Tête d'Or in Lyon. He is best known for developing the popular Polyantha rose, 'Perle d'Or'. None of the rose varieties that Rambaux developed were introduced until after his death in 1878.

Rambaux left his nursery to his wife Claudine, his daughter, Marie, and her husband, Francis Dubreuil. Dubreuil was a tailor at the time, but gave up the profession to help run the family business. Claudine also bred and introduced her own roses. Dubreuil developed over 64 rose varieties during his career. Francis's father, Antoine Meilland, was hired as Dubreuil's gardening assistant in 1900. At the nursery, he met Dubreuil's daughter, Claudia. The couple married in 1909, and Francis was born three years later on February 20, 1912, in Lyon. He was named after his grandfather, Francis Dubreuil.

=== Early years ===
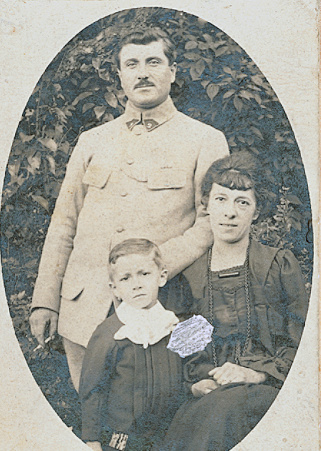
Francis Meilland, (center), with his parents, Antoine and Claudia Meilland, c. 1919

Francis's father, Antoine was drafted into the French army in 1914. His wife, Claudia, managed the family nursery until Antoine returned from the war in 1919. The Meilland family later moved to Tassin-la-Demi-Lune and bought a larger property to expand their rose growing business. Francis showed a strong interest in roses as a child. He worked with his parents at the nursery from the age of fourteen. He would often accompany Antoine to meetings with clients and other rose breeders.

On one of their business trips in 1932, Francis and Antoine met with one of his father's clients in Antibes, the rose breeder Francesco Paolino and his wife Marie-Elizabeth. During this trip, Francis met their daughter, Louisette, who was twelve at the time and would later marry Francis. Francis's first attempts to breed roses were not successful. His father later took Francis to a meeting of rose hybridizers to meet a prominent rose breeder, Charles Mallerin. Mallerin became a mentor to Francis and encouraged his efforts in rose breeding. Years later, Francis honored his mentor by naming a rose after him, the dark red hybrid tea, 'Charles Mallerin'. At the meeting, Mallerin introduced the Meillands to the American businessman, Robert Pyle, who represented Star Roses Nursery in the U.S. Pyle would later sign an agreement with the Meillands, allowing his company to introduce their roses in the United States.

Francis travelled overseas after his mother, Claudia, died of cancer in 1932. He drove across the U.S. to pick up new ideas in rose breeding and cultivation. During this trip, he met again with Robert Pyle. Pyle's company introduced Meilland's first successful rose variety, 'Golden State', bred by Francis before 1937; it was introduced in America in 1938. The name was chosen to commemorate Francis's visit to California. During his U.S. visit, Francis viewed Star Rose's color photo catalog and when he returned to France, he added photos to Meilland's annual rose catalog with great success. The nursery sold every rose advertised in the catalog. During his travels overseas, he learned how cut roses were grown in winter in Colombia. He later had greenhouses built in Kenya to grow the Meilland's nursery's cut roses during the winter. In America, Francis also learned valuable information from Robert Pyle about the American rose market, where the patenting of plants began in 1930. He returned to France and began trademarking the Meilland roses.

=== The 'Peace' rose ===
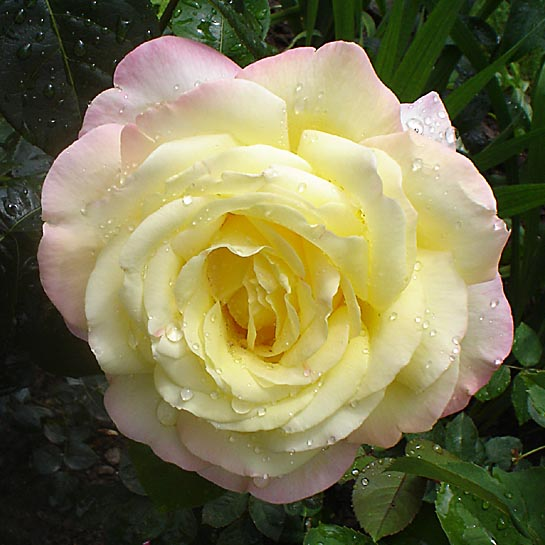
'Peace' rose, 1945

Francis was a talented and prolific rose breeder, and is best remembered for developing the legendary 'Peace' rose. In 1935, he cross-pollinated roses ('George Dickson' x Souvenir de Claudius Pernet') x ('Joanna Hill' x 'Charles P. Kilham'). This cross resulted in an unnamed seedling that was later crossed with 'Margaret McGredy. Francis thought the resulting Hybrid tea seedling of this second cross was very promising. It had dark green, healthy foliage, and beautiful cream-yellow blooms with edges of pink. He noted the seedling in his records as #3-35-40.

Louisette and Francis were married on January 14, 1939. They worked together at the Meilland nursery in Tassin-la-Demi-Lune, collaborating on the selection of new rose varieties; Louisette was the administrator for the nursery. Months later, right before Germany's invasion of France, Francis sent cuttings of the new rose cultivar to fellow rose growers in Germany, Italy, and Turkey, and also to the Conard-Pyle company in the U.S. Francis named the pink and yellow blend rose, ‘Madame Antoine Meilland,’ after his late mother, Claudia. In the U.S., the new rose was successfully propagated. It was later introduced on April 29, 1945, on the same day that Berlin surrendered to Allied forces. The rose was given the marketing name, 'Peace', in the U.S., to mark the end of the war. It was an immediate commercial success and sold extremely well worldwide.

The tremendous success of the 'Peace' rose when it was first introduced, allowed the Meilland family to sell a major portion of their thriving business to Francisque Richardier, rose business owner and friend, so that Francis could focus solely on rose breeding. The Meilland nursery became the Meilland-Richardier company. Francis and Louisette bought property near Cap d'Antibes, his wife's birthplace and where the Paolino family still had a nursery. Francis died at the age of 46, of cancer, on June 15, 1958. Besides his world famous 'Peace Rose', Francis, developed over 150 rose varieties during his career. Since its introduction, there have over 40 million 'Peace' roses sold. It is considered the most popular selling rose of the 20th century. His work was continued by his wife, Louisette, son Alain and daughter Michelle Meilland Richardier.

== Meilland International ==
Meilland Richardier grew into the large rose growing business, Meilland International. The company's headquarters are located in Le Luc en Provence, France. The company is owned entirely by the Meilland and Richardier families. Meilland International, also known as the House of Meilland in France, has three divisions: Meilland International, which creates new rose varieties; Meilland Richardier, which grows and sells commercial roses worldwide; and Selection New Plant (SNP), which finds and acquires innovative varieties of ornamental plants. The company employs over 800 people worldwide and owns rose trial gardens and test stations in France, the U.S. and Germany. The company's new roses are grown on 600 hectares (1500 acres) in France, Morocco, Spain, the Netherlands, and in California. Meilland International sells over 12 million rose plants each year. The company is managed by Alain Meilland and Michell Richardier Meilland, who are also rose breeders for Meilland International. The company's rose breeding program has been led by Jacques Mouchotte since 1978.

== Selected roses ==
- 'Golden State', Hybrid tea, (1938)
- 'Ampère', Hybrid tea, (1939)
- 'Alain', Floribunda (1940)
- 'Peace', Hybrid tea, (1942)
- 'Baccarat', Hybrid tea, (1956)
- 'Michele Meilland', Hybrid tea, (1948)
- 'Alsace', Hybrid tea, (1948)
- 'Tahiti', Hybrid tea, (1948)
- 'Caprice' Hybrid tea, (1948)
- 'Charles Mallerin', Hybrid tea, (1948)
- 'Monte Carlo', Hybrid tea, (1949)
- 'Confidence', Hybrid tea, (1951)
- 'Symphonie', Hybrid tea, (1950)
- 'Belle Blonde', Hybrid tea, (1955)
- 'Champs-Elysées', Hybrid tea, (1957)
- 'Christian Dior', Hybrid tea, (1958)
- 'Bettina', Hybrid tea, (1959)

== Gallery ==
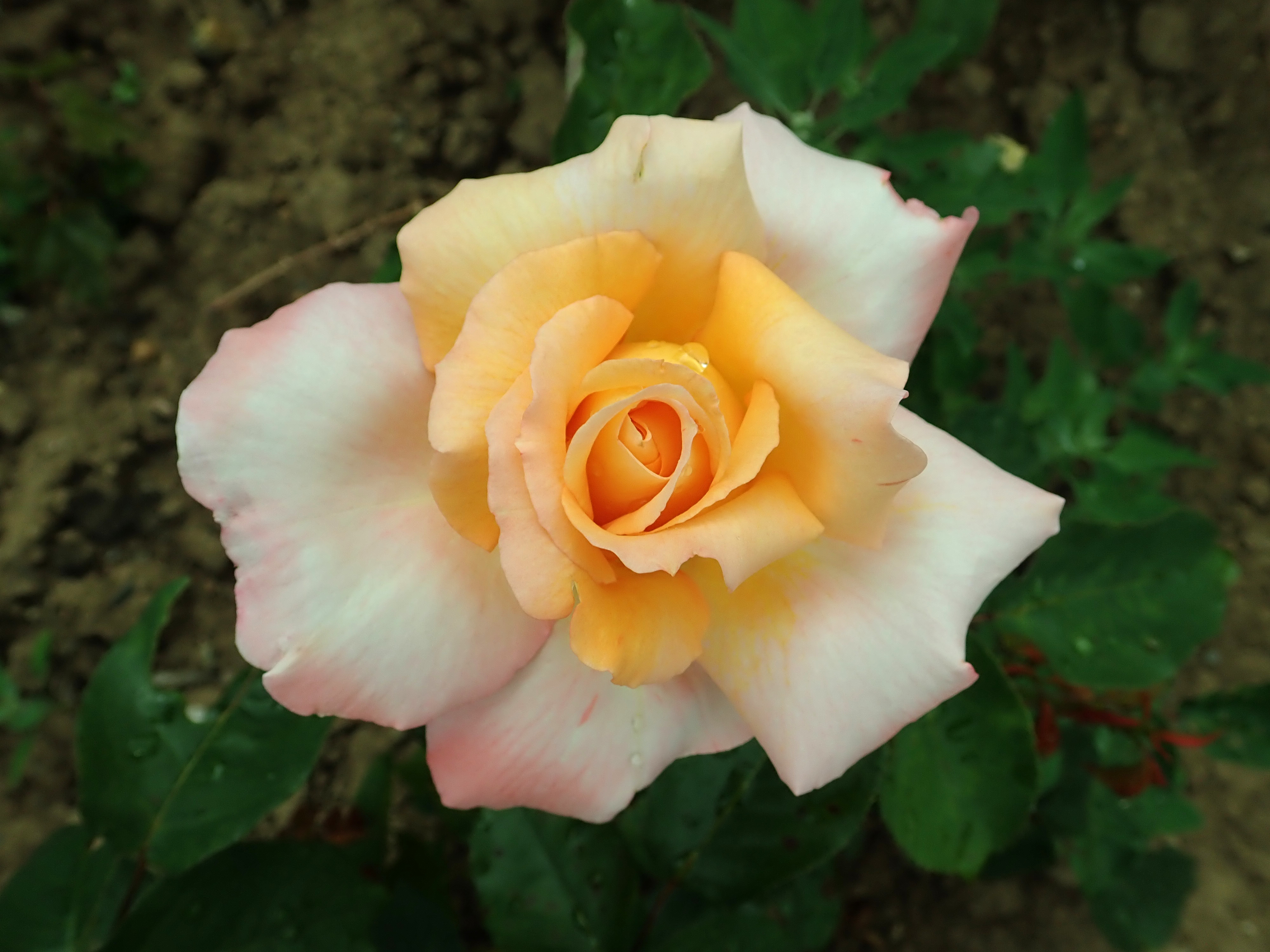
'Vatican', (1939)

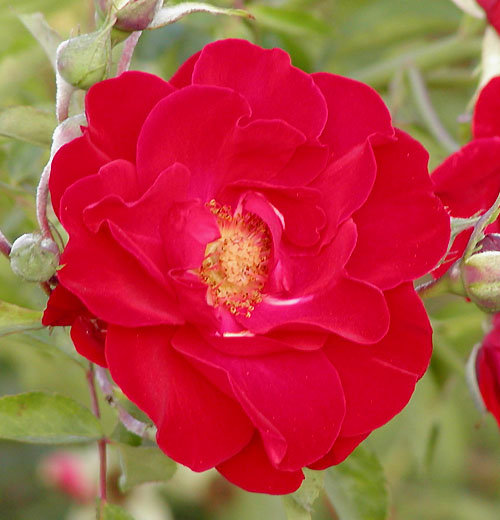
'Alain', (1946)

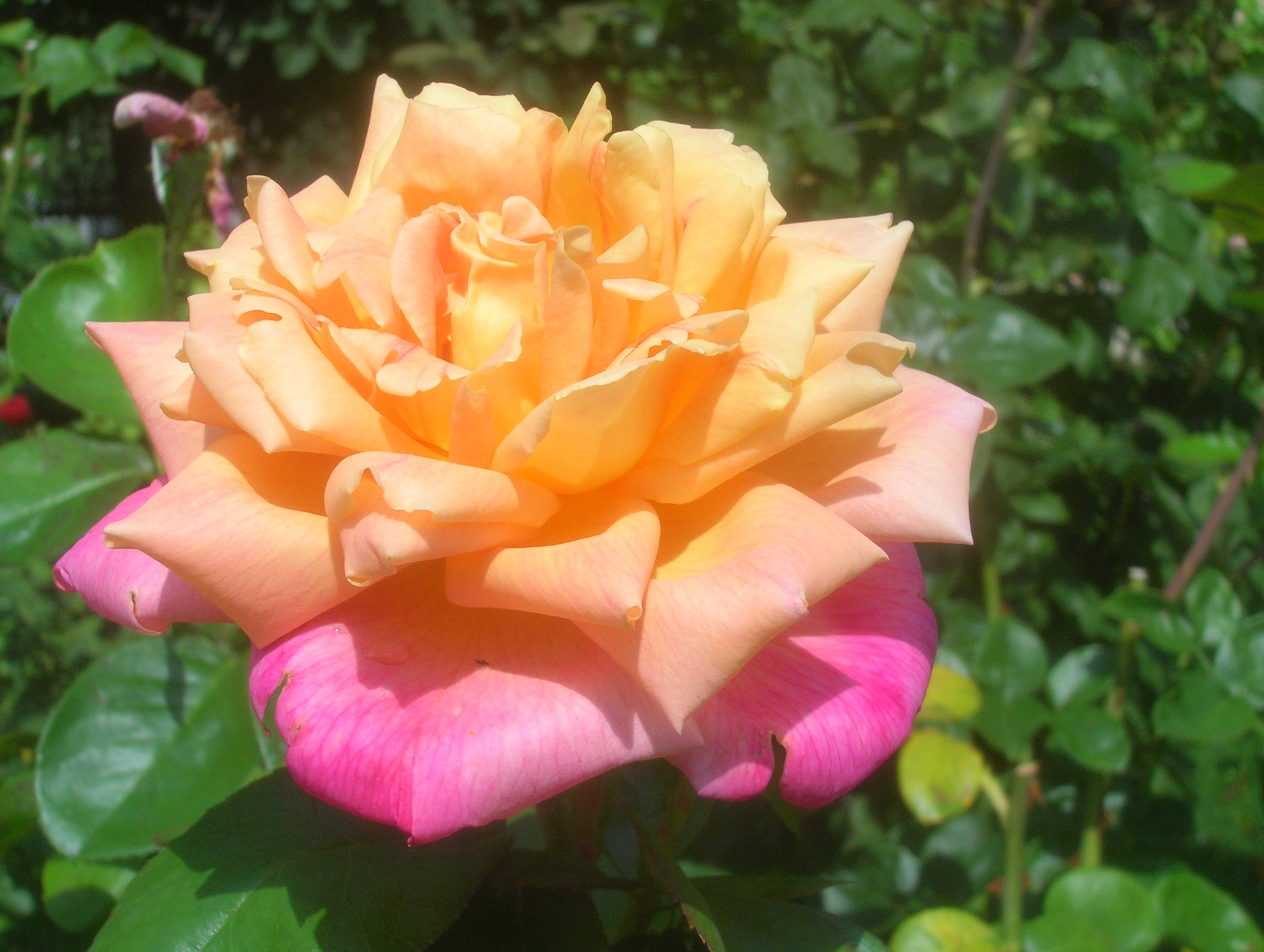
'Tahiti', (1948)

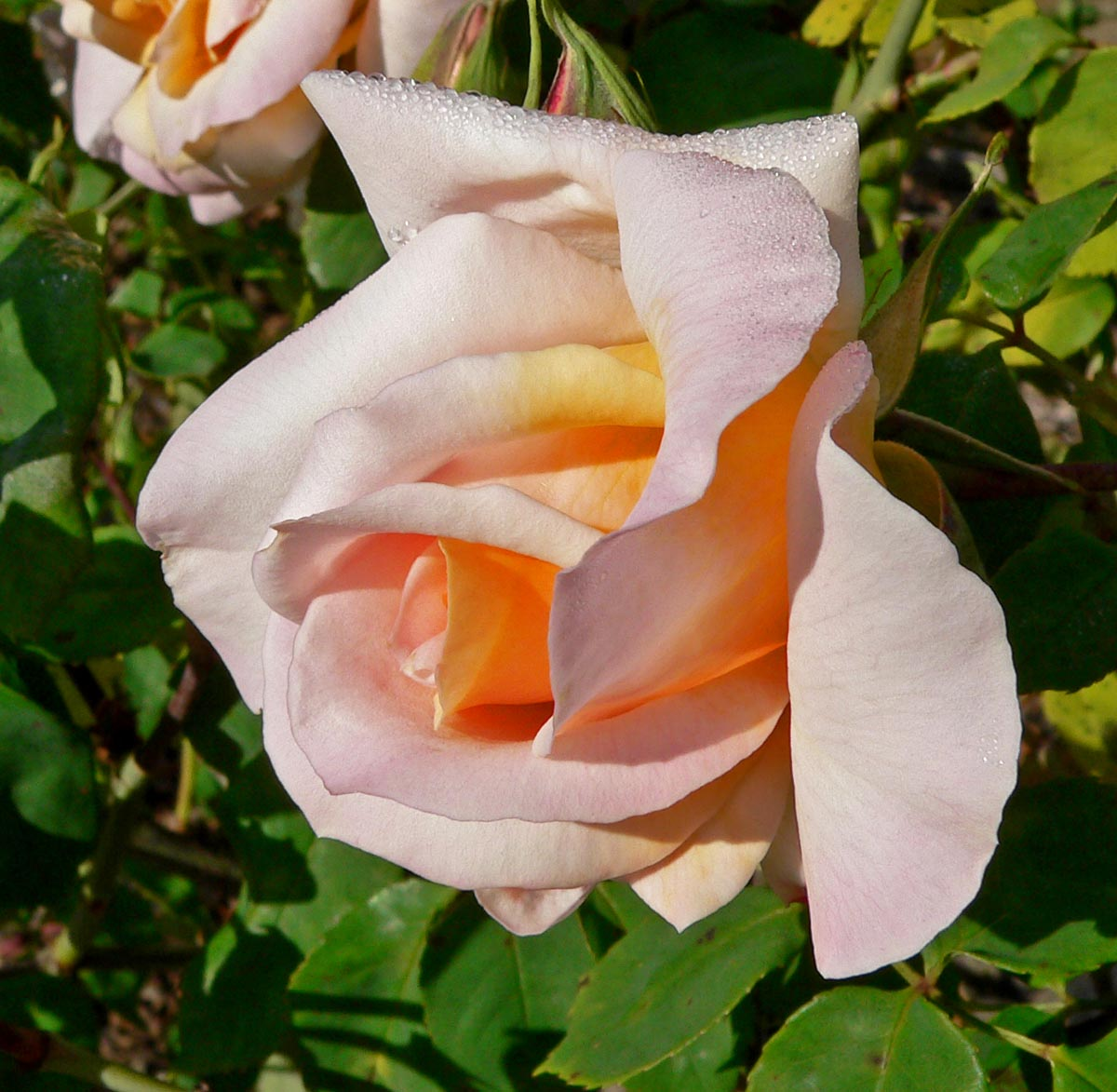
'Michele Meilland', (1948)

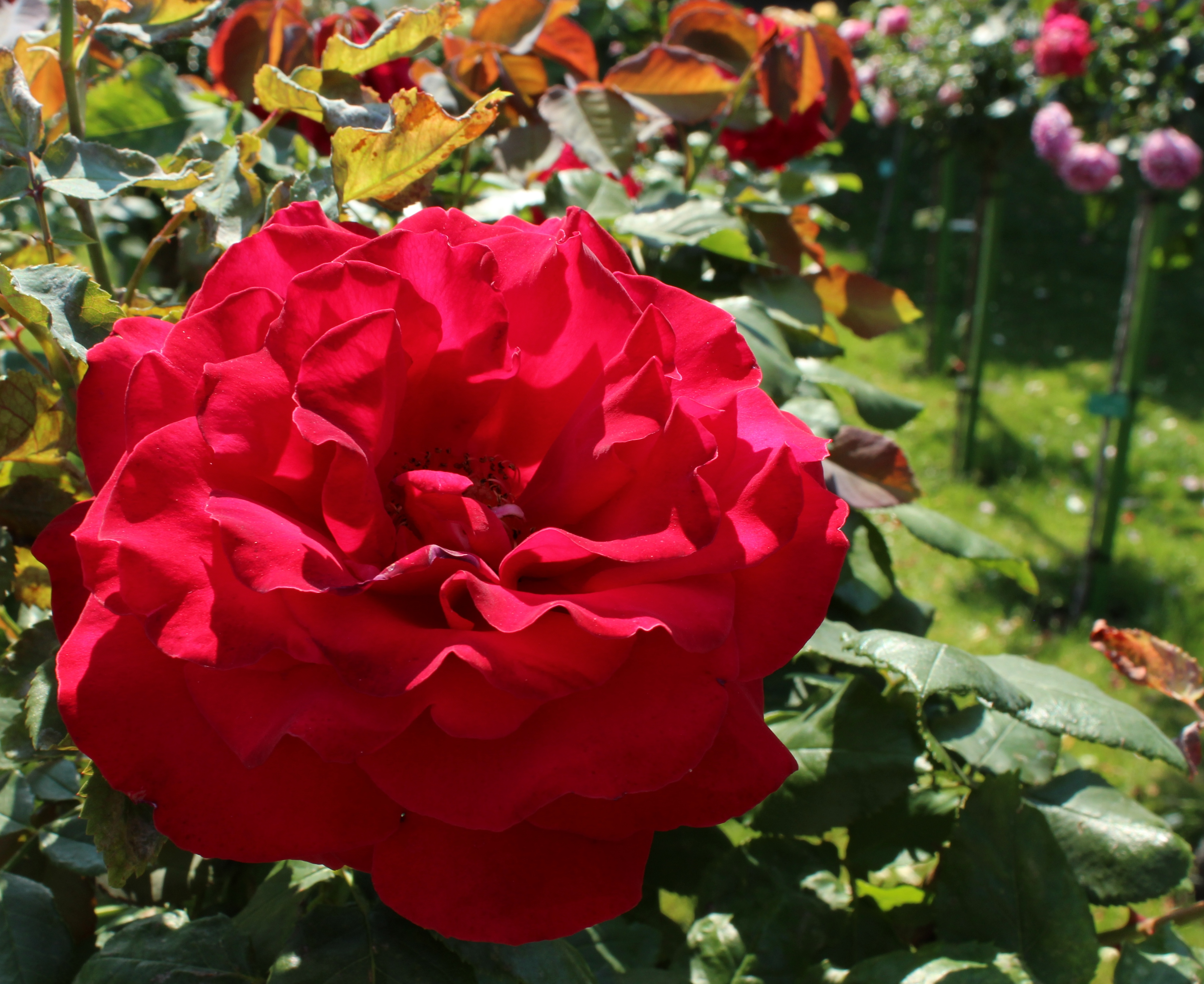
'Rouge Meilland', (1949)

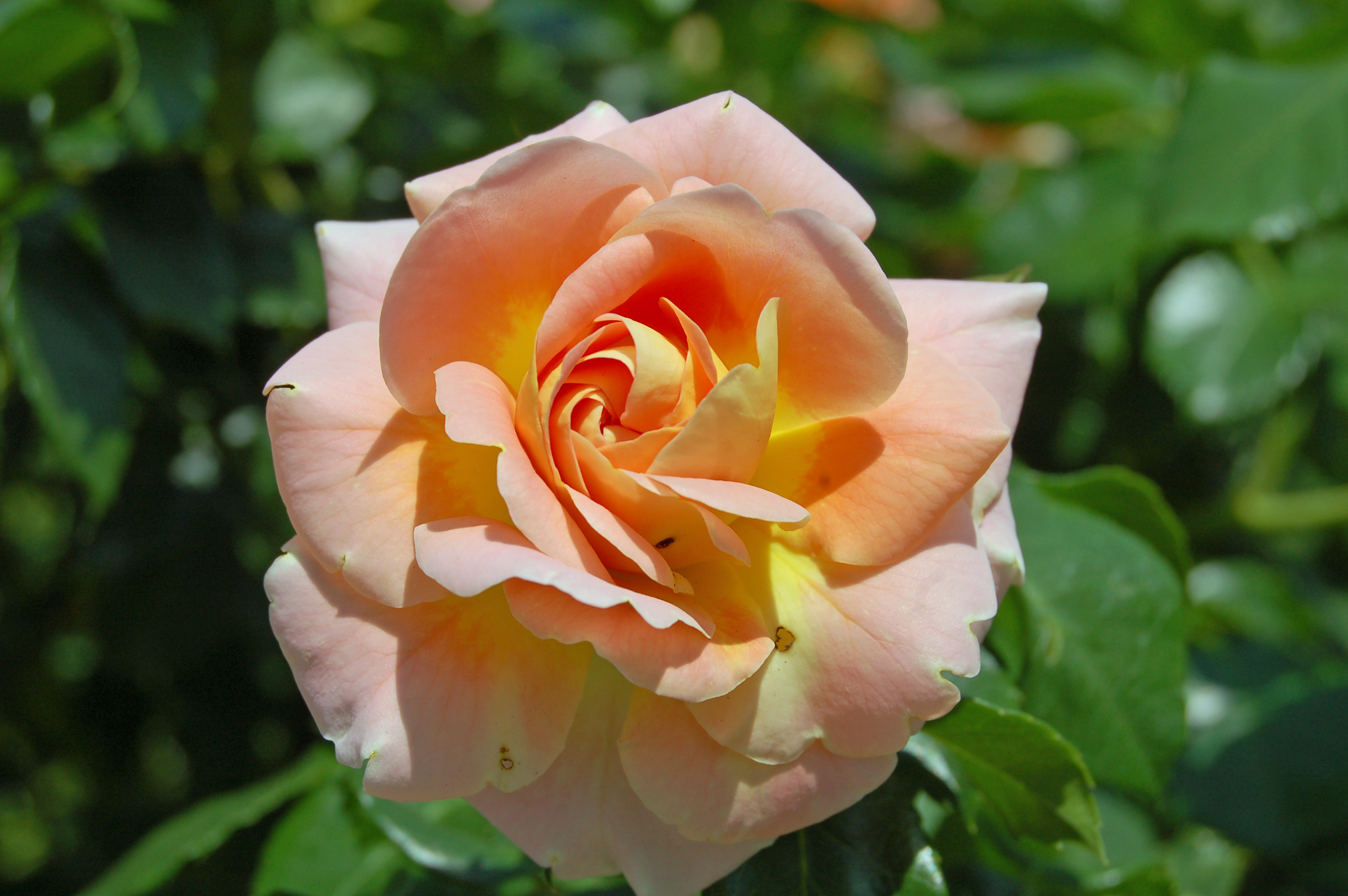
'Concerto' (1953)

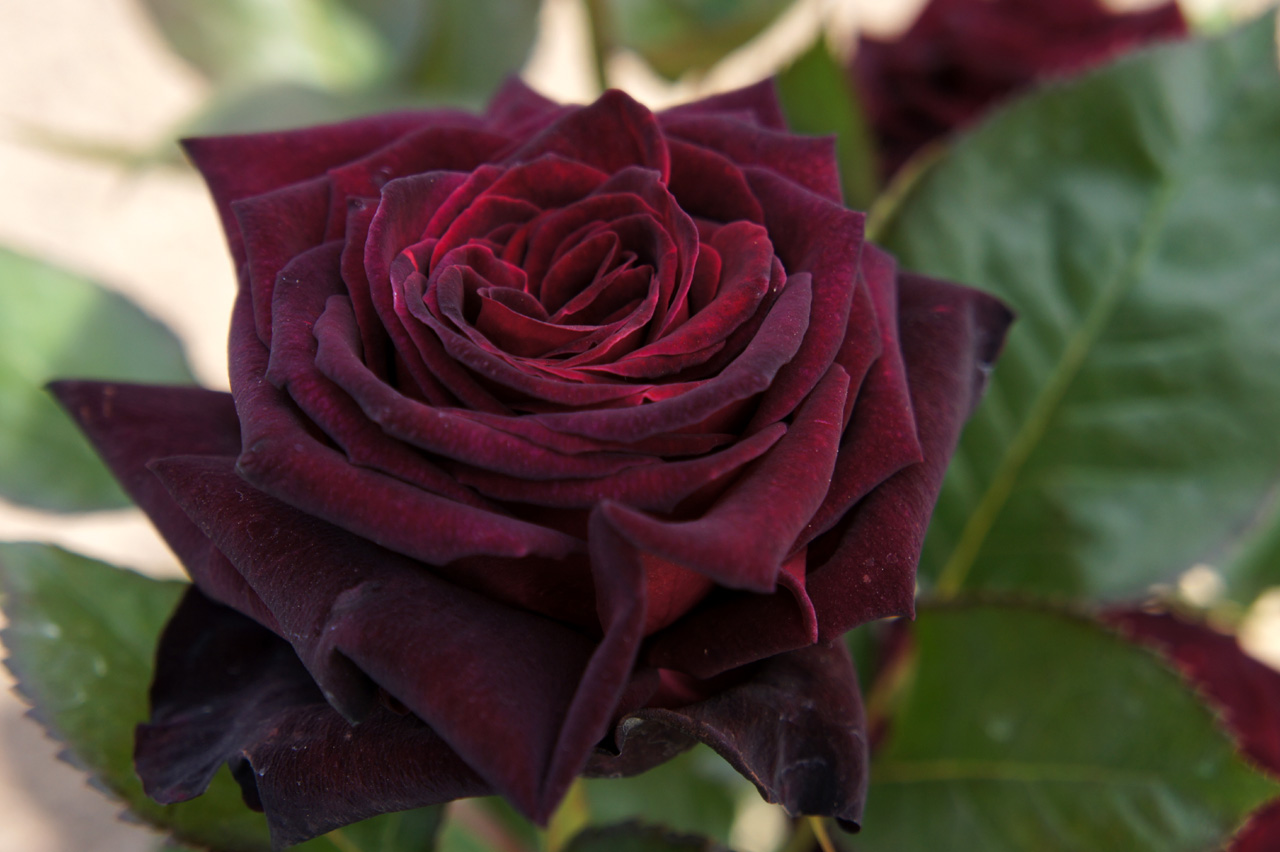
'Baccará' (1954)

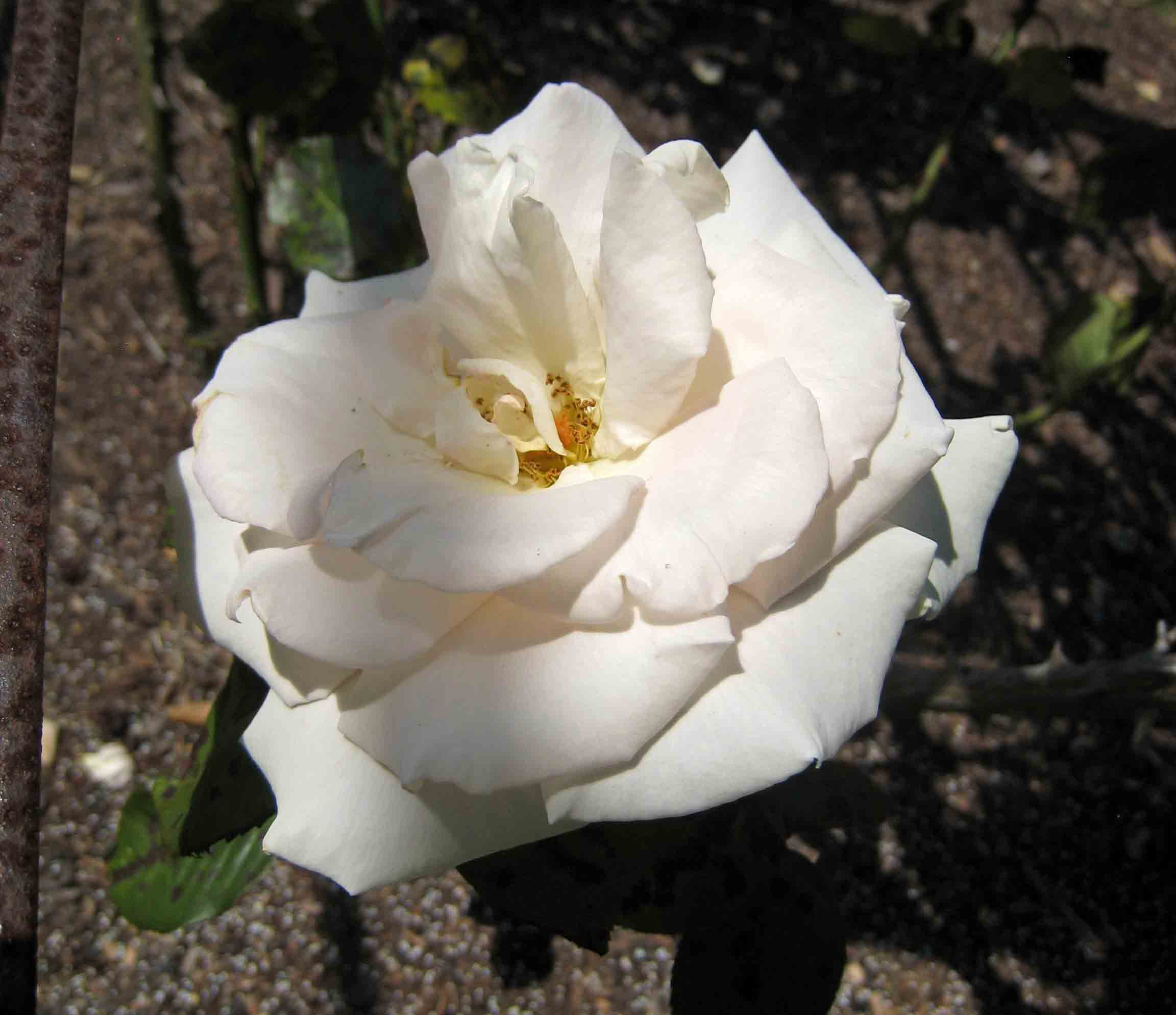
'White Knight', (1955)

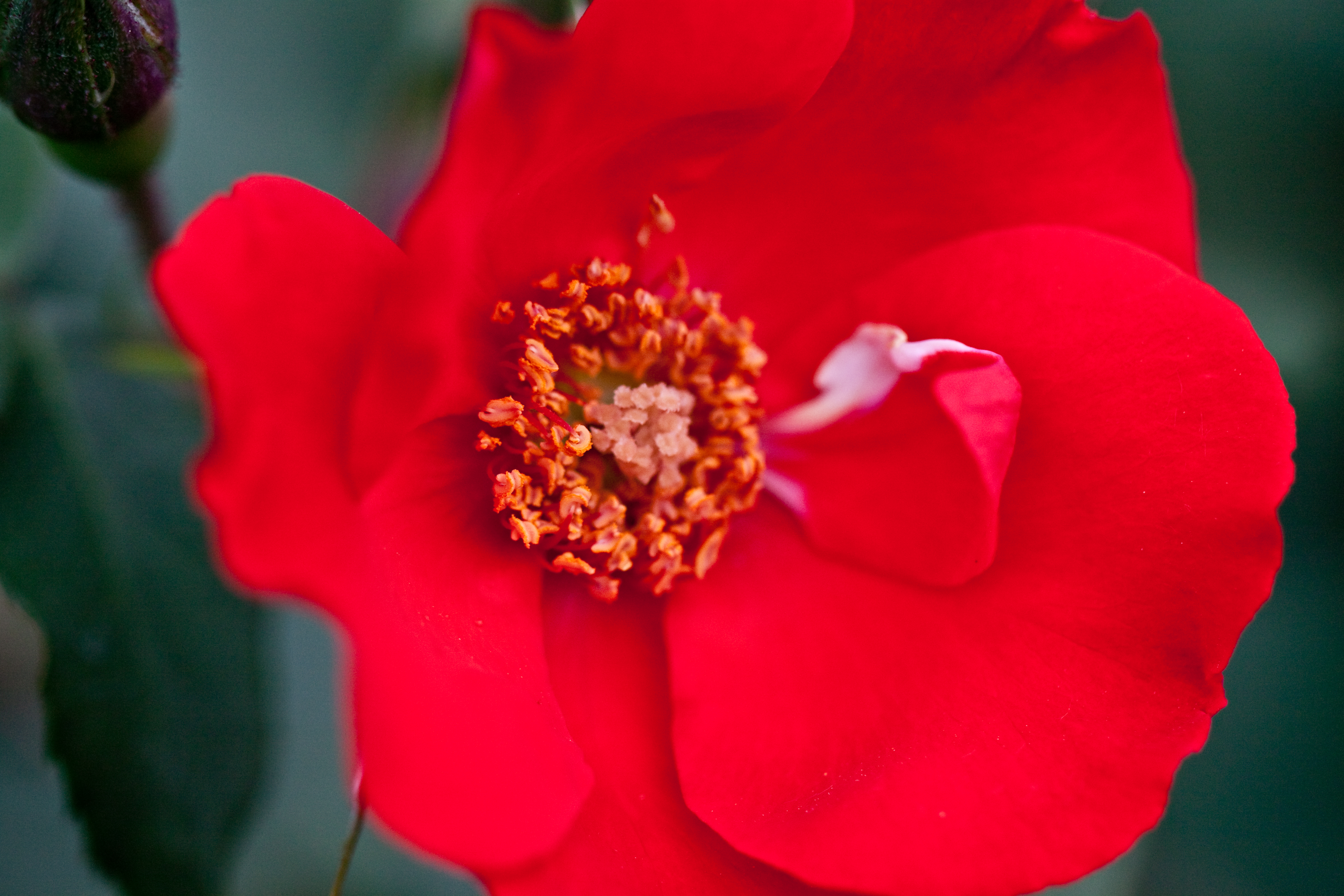
'Sarabande', (1957)

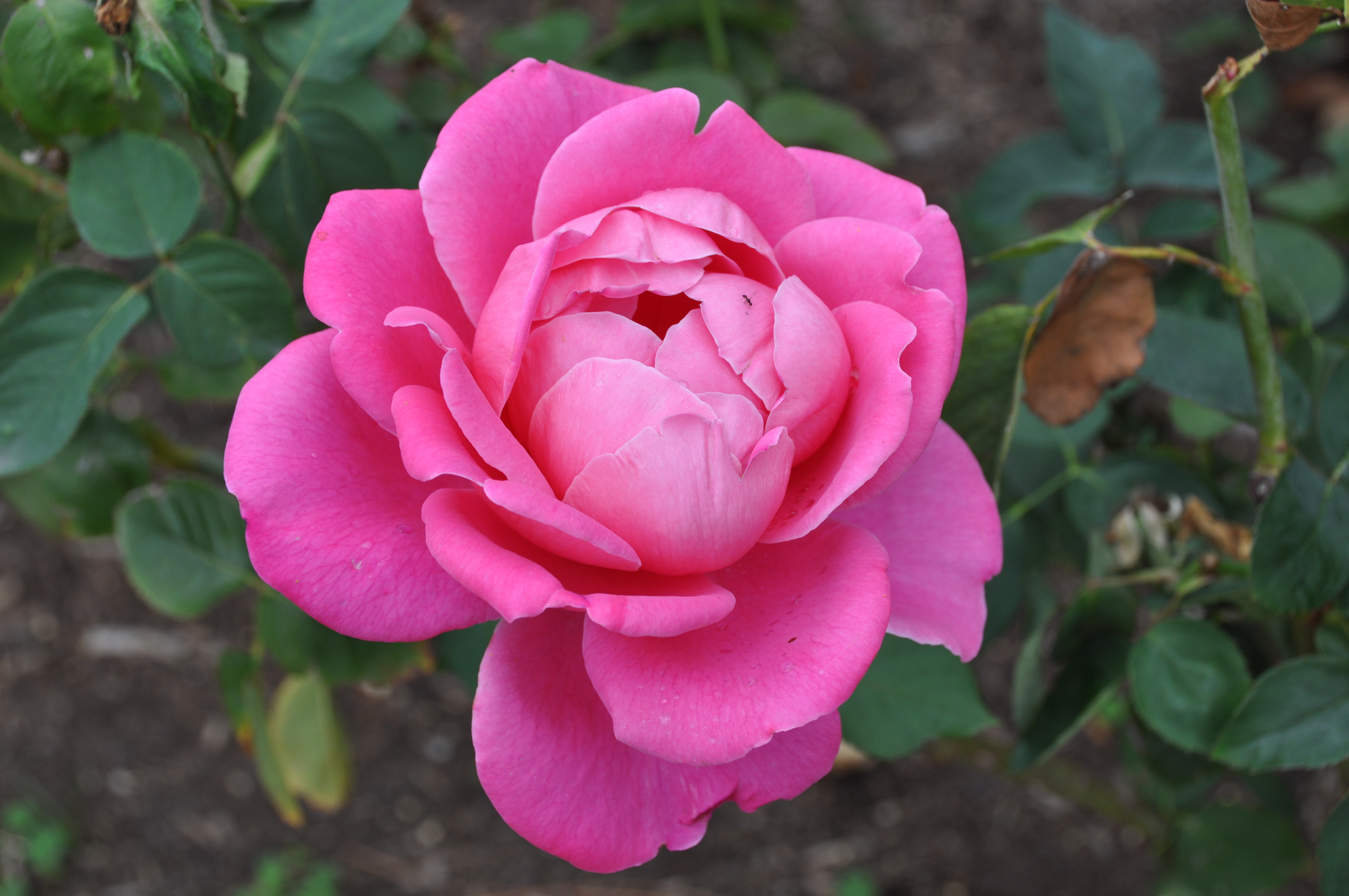
'Pink Peace', (1958)

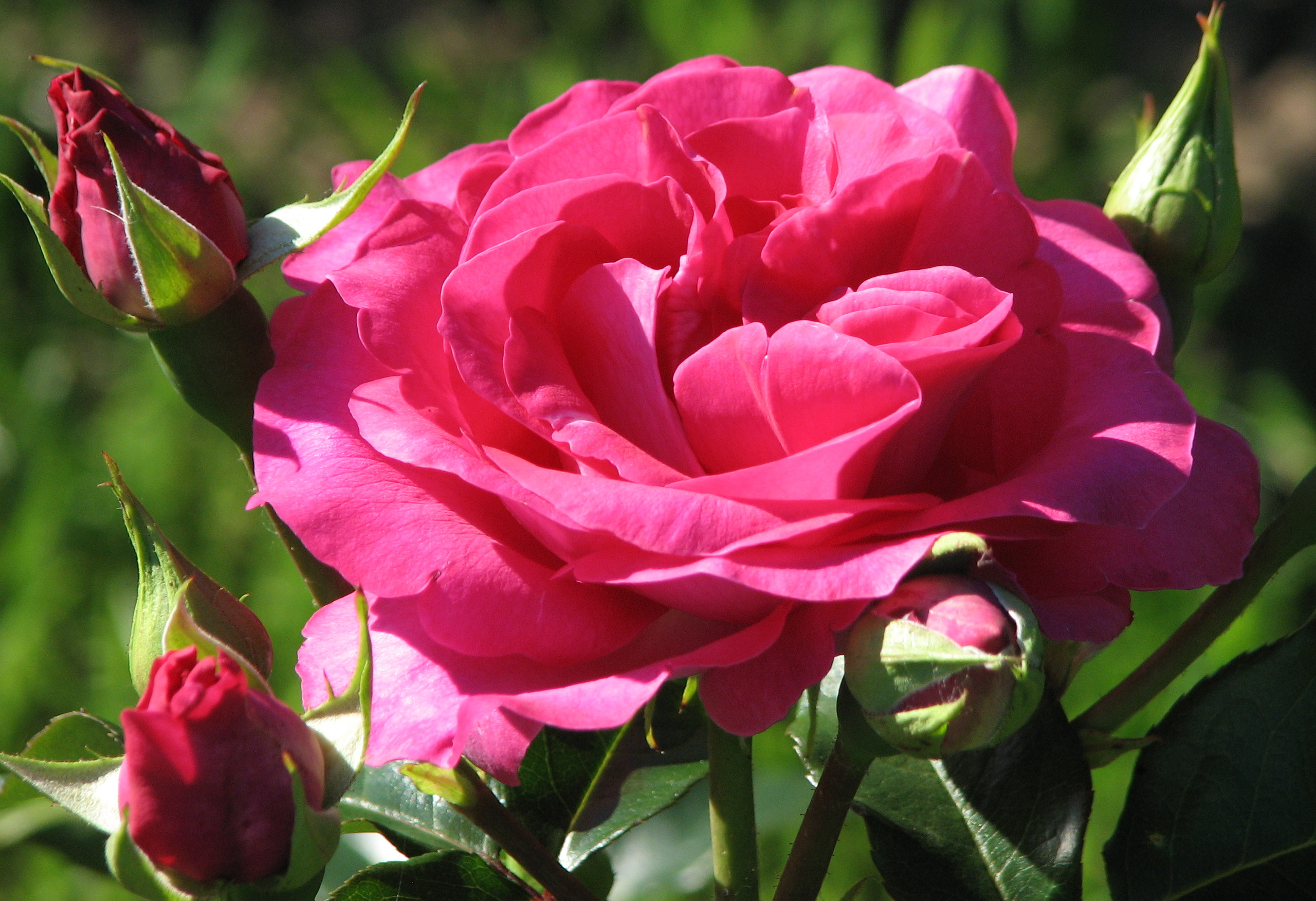
'Manou Meilland' (1979)

== Sources ==
- Harkness, Jack (1985). The Maker of Heavenly Roses. ISBS. ISBN 978-0285626546.
- Phillips, Roger; Rix, Martin (1993). Quest for the Rose: A Historical Guide to Roses. Random House. ISBN 978-0679435730.
- Quest-Ritson, Brigid; Quest-Ritson, Charles (2003). Encyclopedia of Roses. DK Publishing. ISBN 978-0756688684.
