= Meilland International SA =

Family-owned rose growing business in Var, France

Meilland International SA is a family-owned rose growing business founded circa 1850. The business operates today out of the Domaine de Saint André in Le Cannet-des-Maures, Le Luc en Provence, Var, France with branches all over the world.

== History ==
The Meilland Family is a multi-generational family of French rose breeders. The family's first rosarian was gardener, Joseph Rambaux, who first started breeding roses in 1850 in Lyon. He is best known for developing the Polyantha 'Perle d'Or'. His wife, Claudine and son-in-law, Francois Dubreuil, took over the family nursery after Rambaux died in 1878. Debreuil became a successful rose breeder and grower. In 1900, Dubreuil hired sixteen year old, Antoine Meilland, as a gardening assistant, working alongside Dubreuil's daughter, Claudia. Antoine and Claudia married in 1909 and their son, Francis was born in 1912. The couple took over Dubareuil's nursery after his death in 1916.

After World War I, Antoine and Claudia bought property in Tassin-la-Demi-Lune, near Lyon and started a new nursery. Their son, Francis, married Marie-Louise (Louisette) Paolino, daughter of an Italian rose breeder. Francis grew the nursery into a large, international company, and became the most famous and prolific rose breeder in the family. His legendary 'Peace' rose, brought the family international attention and great commercial success it was introduced after World War II. The Meilland family merged their business with Francisque Richardier in 1946, so that Francis Meilland could focus solely on breeding roses.

After Francis's early death in 1958, Louisette continued to breed roses, introducing many awarding winning new varieties. The new company, Meilland-Richardier grew into Meilland International (AKA House of Meilland), and is located in Le Luc en Provence, France. Francis and Louisette's children, Alain and Michelle, were both successful rose breeders and took over management of the company when Louisette retired. In 1978, Jacques Mouchotte was promoted to Director of Research of the company's rose breeding program. He developed a large number of new rose cultivars during his years at Meilland International. Some of his most popular rose varieties are 'Bonica 82', 'Debut', 'Carefree Wonder', 'Black Baccara' and 'Carefree Delight'. Meilland International continues to be 100% family owned and managed.

== House of Meilland ==
Meilland Richardier grew into a large international rose-growing business, the House of Meilland, also known as Meilland International. The company's headquarters are in Luc en Provence, France. The company is owned entirely by the Meilland and Richardier families. The House of Meilland has three divisions: Meilland International, which creates new rose varieties; Meilland Richardier, which grows and sells commercial roses worldwide; and Selection New Plant (SNP), which finds and acquires innovative varieties of ornamental plants.

The company employs over 800 people worldwide and owns rose trial gardens and test stations in France, the U.S., and Germany. Meilland International sells over 12 million rose plants each year. The company is managed by Alain Meilland and Michell Richardier Meilland, who are also rose breeders for Meilland International. The company's rose breeding program has been led by Jacques Mouchotte since 1978.

== Roses ==
cultivar	group	colour	year	award	foto
'Alain'	Floribunda	red	1946	Most Beautiful French Rose	
'Louis de Funès'	Hybrid Tea	yellow-red blend	1987	Geneva GM	
'Madame A. Meilland' (Peace)	Hybrid Tea	yellow blend	1935	Rose Hall of Fame	
'Pierre de Ronsard'	Large-flowered climber	pink blend	1985	Rose Hall of Fame	
'Pink Wonder'	Floribunda	pink	1970	Belfast GM, Madrid GM	
'Line Renaud'	Hybrid Tea	pink	2006	ADR	
'Bonica 82'	Floribunda	pink	1981	Rose Hall of Fame; AGM 1993	
'Papa Meilland'	Hybrid Tea	dark red	1963	Rose Hall of Fame; Gamble Fragrance Award 1974	
'Pink Flamingo'	Hybrid Tea	pink-salmon blend	1963	Portland Rose Trials; Best Grandiflora Rose 2014	

== Sources ==
- Harkness, Jack (1985). The Maker of Heavenly Roses. ISBS. ISBN 978-0285626546.
- Phillips, Roger (2003). Quest for the Rose: A Historical Guide to Roses. Random House. ISBN 978-0679435730.
- Quest-Ritson, Brigid; Quest-Ritson, Charles (2003). Encyclopedia of Roses. DK Publishing. ISBN 978-0756688684.
