= Joseph Rambaux =

French rose breeder (1820–1878)

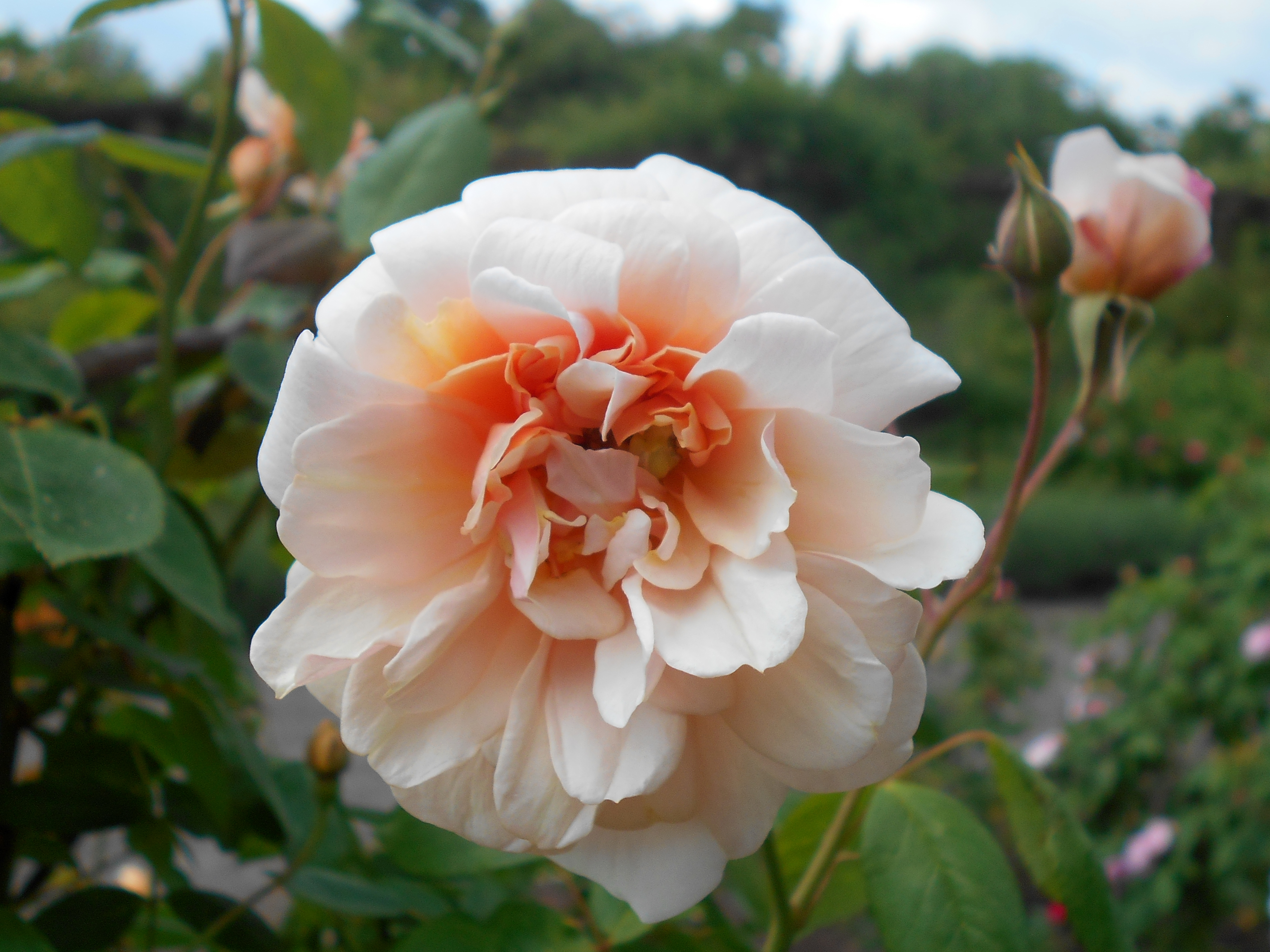
'Perle d'Or', (1883)

Joseph Rambaux (1820–1878) was a gardener and rose breeder from Lyon, France. He is considered the patriarch of the Meilland family, who have been rose breeders for six generations. The rose variety he is best remembered for is the Polyantha, 'Perle d'Or', introduced in France in 1883. 'Perle d'Or' was granted several awards, including the Lyon Gold Medal in 1883, and the Royal Horticultural Society's Award of Garden Merit in 1993.

== Biography ==
Philippe Jean-Baptiste François ("Joseph") Rambaux was born in Dracy-le-fort, France, on March 18, 1820. He was a gardener at Parc de la Tête d'Or. In France, in the 1830s and 1840s, rose breeders begun to practice the hybridization of roses and this quickly became the preferred method of developing new rose varieties. The cities where rose breeding was most practiced at the time was Angers, Paris, Lyon, and Orléans. Rambaux became interested in rose breeding in 1850 and started breeding new roses at home, from crosses of roses from the gardens where he worked. The rose varieties that Rambaux developed during his career were mostly Hybrid Perpetuals, and all his new rose cultivars were introduced after his death on July 30, 1878. Rambaux left his rose breeding business to his wife Claudine (née Grappelou), daughter Marie and son-in-law, Francis Dubreuil (1842–1916).

Rambaux's rose varieties include, 'Perle d'Or, 'Madame Marie Finger' 'Monsieur Rambaux', 'Madame Pauvert', 'Monsieur Druet', and 'Jean Chevalier'. Claudine Rambaux developed six new rose varieties under the name of "Veuve Rambaux" (Widow Rambaux), including Tea rose, 'Souvenir du rosiériste Rambaux' (1883) and Hybrid Perpetual, 'Madame Rambeaux' (1894). Dubreuil introduced two of Joseph's rose varieties: Polyanthas, 'Perle d'Or' (1883), and 'Anna Maria de Montravel' (1897). Perle d'Or' was granted several awards, including the Lyon Gold Medal in 1883, and the Royal Horticultural Society's Award of Garden Merit in 1993.

Rambaux was the first of six generations of a family of awarding-winning rose breeders. They grew from a small family nursery in the mid-1800s into a large international rose growing business by the 1940s and have produced hundreds of award winning and popular roses, including 'Peace' ('Mme Antoine Meilland'), the rose that made the Meilland family famous after World War II. The Meilland rose breeders include, Francis Debreuil, Claudine Rambaux, Antoine Meilland, Francis 'Papa Meilland', Louisette Meilland, Alain Meilland, and Michelle Meilland Richardier.

== Rose varieties ==
=== Joseph Rambaux ===
- 'Madame Marie Finger' Hybrid perpetual (1872)
- 'Monsieur Rambaux', Hybrid perpetual (1872)
- 'Madame Pauvert', China rose, (1876)
- 'Monsieur Druet', Hybrid perpetual, (1876)
- 'Jean Chevalier', Hybrid Perpetual, (1879)
- 'Anna Maria de Montravel', Polyantha (1897)
- 'Perle d'Or', Polyantha, (1883), introduced by Dubreuil

=== Claudine Rambaux ===
- 'Marie Rambaux', Tea rose, (1881)
- 'Rosa polyantha remontant', Polyantha, (1879)
- 'Ornement des Jardins', Polyantha climber
- 'Souvenir du rosiériste Rambaux', Tea rose, (1883)
- 'Madame Rambaux', Hybrid perpetual, 1881
- 'Anna Marie de Montravel', Hybrid perpetual, (1879)

== Sources ==
- Dickerson, Brent C (2001). The Old Rose Advisor (Volume 2). Portland, Oregon: IUniversie. ISBN 978-0595172993.
- Harkness, Jack (1985). The Maker of Heavenly Roses. ISBS. ISBN 978-0285626546.
- Quest-Ritson, Brigid; Quest-Ritson, Charles (2003). Encyclopedia of Roses. DK Publishing. ISBN 978-0756688684.
