= Rosa 'Perle d'Or' =

Pale apricot Polyantha rose

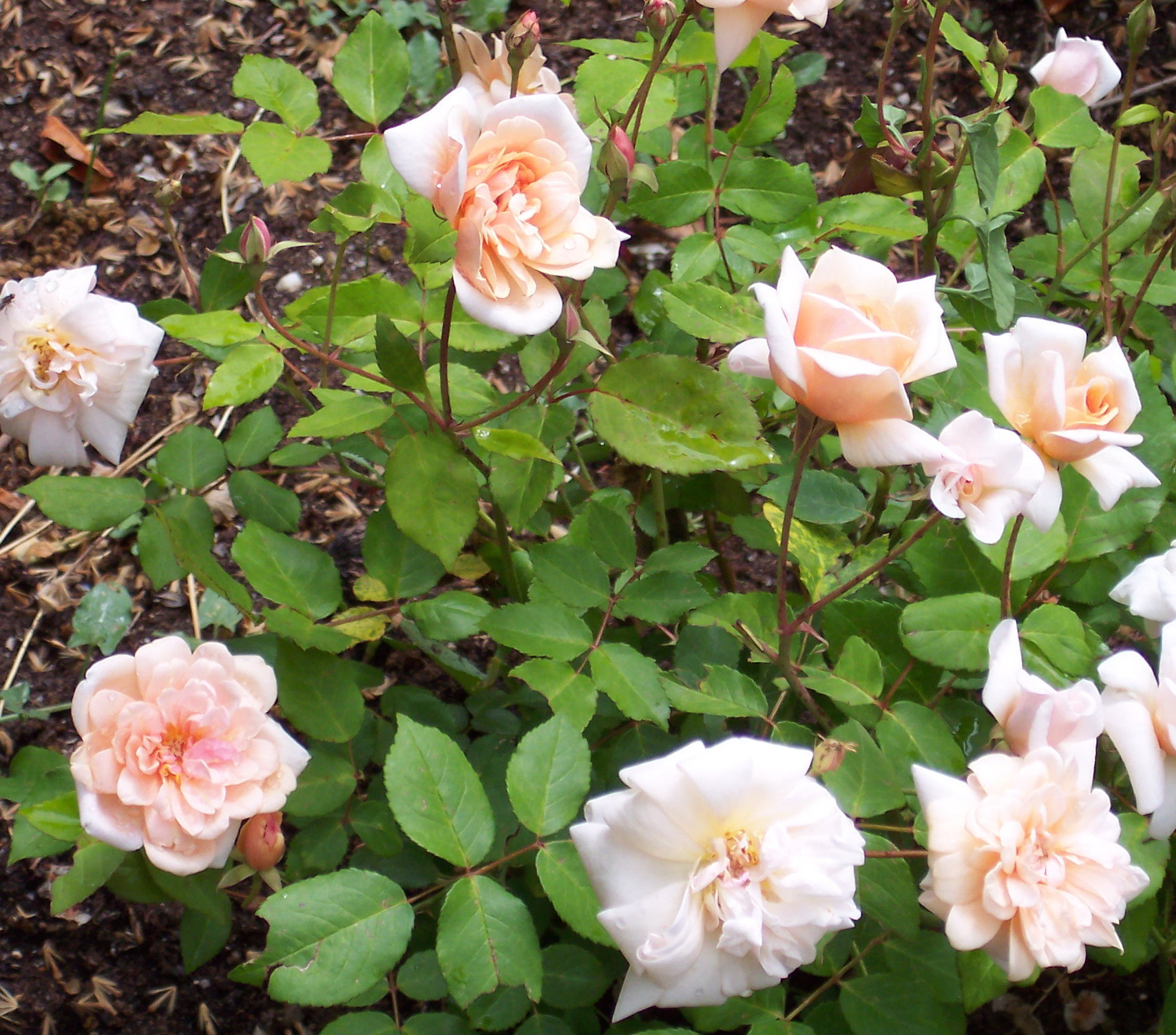
- Genus: Rosa hybrid
- Hybrid parentage: R. multiflora × tea rose 'Mme Falcot'
- Cultivar group: Polyantha
- Cultivar: Perle d'Or
- Marketing names: 'Yellow Cécile Brünner'
- Origin: Rambaux, 1875

Rosa 'Perle d'Or' is an apricot blend Polyantha rose cultivar bred by Joseph Rambaux in 1875 and introduced by Francis Dubreuil in France in 1883. 'Perle d'Or' was granted several awards, including the Lyon Gold Medal in 1883, and the Royal Horticultural Society's Award of Garden Merit in 1993.

== Description ==
'Perle d'Or' is a medium-tall Polyantha rose, 3 to 6 ft (0.91–1.83 m) in height, with a 3 to 4 ft (0.91–1.22 m) spread. The small 2 in (51 mm) flowers have 26 to 40 petals, forming small light rosettes with an average diameter of 4 centimetres (1.6 in) Their colour is creamy amber with a hint of pink and ages to white, starting at the edges. Their fragrance is described as sweet and fruity, and varying in strength from light to strong. They develop from vermillion, long, ovoid buds, that open to a deep apricot-pink colour and appear in large, long-stemmed clusters of 5 to 25 in flushes throughout the season. 'Perle d'Or' has well-branched shoots with small, glossy, medium to dark green foliage, and very few scattered, large prickles. The vigorous shrub grows densely, reaching 0.9 to 1.8 metres (3.0 to 5.9 ft) height at a width of 0.6 to 1 metre (2.0 to 3.3 ft), and is winter hardy down to −20 °C (USDA zone 6 to 7). While the original form is a low shrub, a climbing sport also exists (discovered before 1931).

"'When the first Polyanthas were crossed with Tea roses, their offspring combined the delicate size of the former with the subtle colors of the latter. 'Perle d'Or' is an excellent example and a rose of outstanding beauty and charm."

— Quest-Ritson, 2003

== History ==
=== Joseph Rambaux ===
Philippe Jean-Baptiste François ("Joseph") Rambaux was born in Dracy-le-fort, France on March 18, 1820. He is the first generation of the legendary Meilland family rose breeders and growers. He was a gardener at Parc de la Tête d'Or and became interested in rose breeding in 1850. He first began developing new rose cultivars at home, with crosses of roses from the gardens where he worked. The rose varieties that Rambaux developed during his career were mostly Hybrid Perpetual roses, and all his new cultivars were introduced after his death on July 30, 1878. Rambaux left his rose breeding business to his wife Claudine, daughter Marie and son-in-law, Louis-Francois (Francis) Dubrueil (1842–1916).

=== 'Perle d'Or' ===
Polyantha roses were created by crossing China roses with dwarf, repeat flowering Rosa multifloras. The first hybrids developed were single flowering varieties, but the second generation produced repeat flowering roses. When Tea roses were later used in breeding Polyanthas, prettier dwarf roses were produced. 'Cécile Brünner' and Perle d'Or are excellent examples of this kind of hybridization. Both have a loose growing habit, hybrid-tea shaped flowers and are still popular roses in the 21st century. Polyanthas reached their peak of popularity in 1909 and were surpassed by Hybrid teas and Hybrid Perpetuals. Rambaux created 'Perle d'Or' from a cross between a double-flowered R. multiflora seedling and the tea rose 'Madame Falcot' (Guillot, 1858). It is sometimes referred to as a China rose and sometimes considered a Polyantha. It is also known as 'Yellow Cécile Brünner'', as the pale apricot rose greatly resembles the related pale pink 'Cécile Brünner'. 'Perle d'Or' was granted several awards, including the Lyon Gold Medal in 1883, and the Royal Horticultural Society's Award of Garden Merit in 1993.

== Sources ==
- Phillips, Roger (1993). Quest for the Rose: A Historical Guide to Roses. Random House. ISBN 978-0679435730.
- Phillips, Roger; Rix, Martin (2004). The Ultimate Guide toRoses. Pan Macmillan. ISBN 978-1405049207.
- Quest-Ritson, Brigid; Quest-Ritson, Charles (2003). Encyclopedia of Roses. DK Publishing. ISBN 978-0756688684.
