= Rosa 'Michele Meilland' =

Light pink Floribunda rose cultivar

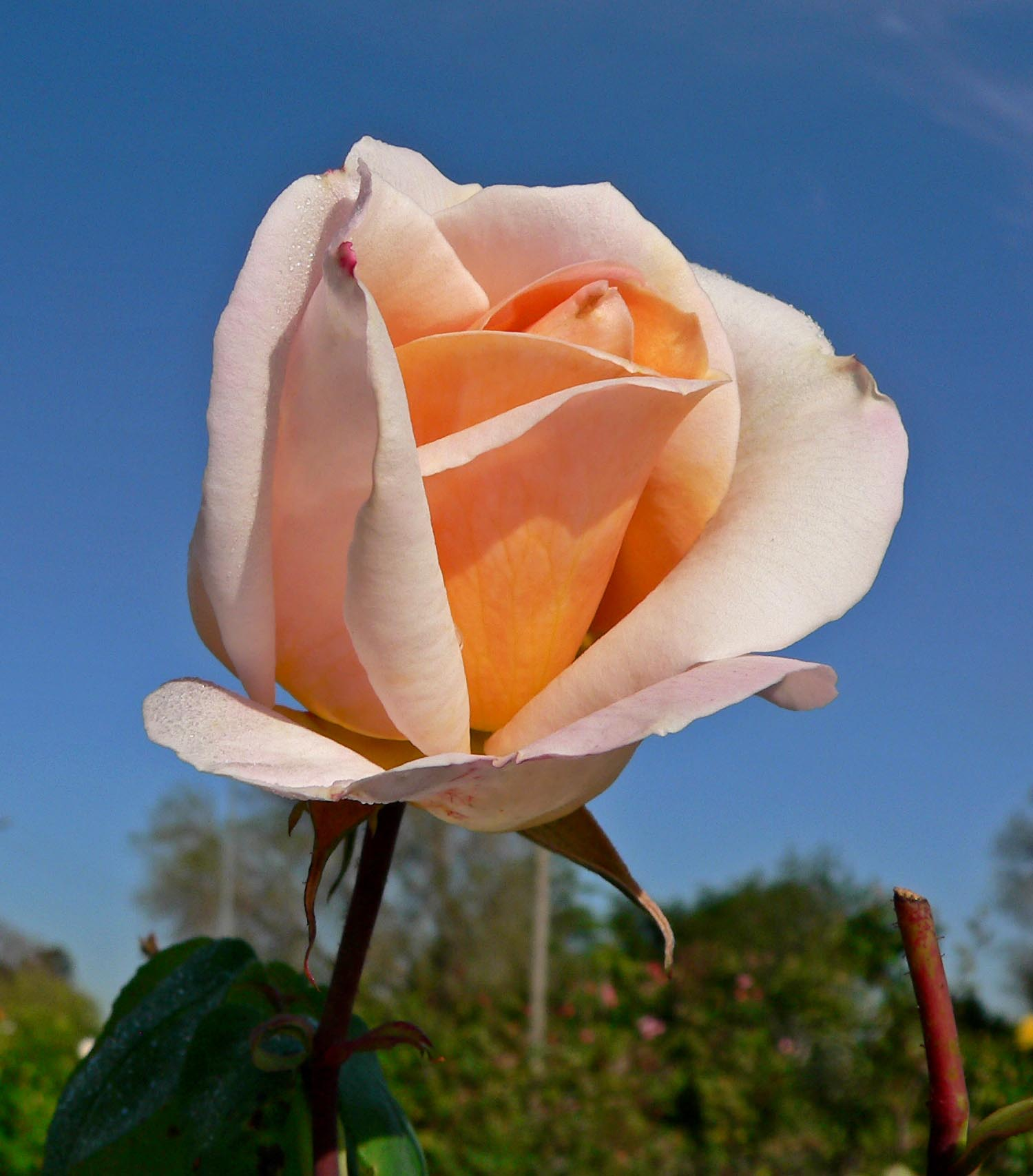
- Rosa 'Michele Meilland'
- Genus: Rosa hybrid
- Hybrid parentage: 'Joanna Hill' and 'Peace'.
- Cultivar group: Floribunda
- Breeder: Francis Meilland
- Origin: France, 1948

Rosa 'Michele Meilland' is a light pink Floribunda rose cultivar, bred by Francis Meilland in 1945. Meilland International introduced the rose in France in 1948. It was named for Meilland's daughter, Michele, who was born in 1943. It was named the most beautiful rose in France in 1945.

== Description ==
'Michele Meilland' is a medium bushy, upright hybrid tea rose, 3 to 5 ft (0.91–1.52 m)in height, with a 2 to 3 ft (0.61–0.91 m) spread. It has a double (17-25 petals) bloom form. Bloom size is 4 in (100 mm). The flowers are light pink with a hint of salmon or copper toward the center, and lighter transparent pink toward the edges. Beautiful and slender, yellow-orange buds, open to a pale pink rose with hints of orange. The flowers are elegantly shaped, both as slender buds and open blooms, and are their prettiest in the autumn. The plant does best in cooler climates. It has medium green, healthy leaves.

== History ==
=== Meilland International ===
The Meilland family is a multi-generational family of French rose breeders. The family's first rosarian was gardener, Joseph Rambaux, who first started breeding roses in 1850 in Lyon. He is best known for developing the Polyantha 'Perle d'Or'. His wife, Claudine and son-in-law, Francois Dubreuil, took over the nursery after Rambaux died in 1878. Dubreuil became a successful rose breeder and grower. In 1900, Dubreuil hired sixteen year old, Antoine Meilland, as a gardening assistant, where he met Dubreuil's daughter, Claudia. Antoine and Claudia married in 1909 and their son, Francis was born in 1912. The couple took over Dubreuil's nursery after his death in 1916.

After World War I, Antoine and Claudia bought property in Tassin-la-Demi-Lune, near Lyon and started a new nursery. Their son, Francis, married Marie-Louise (Louisette) Paolino, daughter of an Italian rose breeder in 1939. Francis expanded the rose business over time into a large, international company, and became the most famous and prolific rose breeder in the family. His legendary 'Peace' rose, brought the family international attention and great commercial success when it was introduced after World War II. The Meilland family merged their business with Francisque Richardier in 1946, so that Francis Meilland could focus solely on breeding roses. After Francis's early death in 1958, Louisette continued to breed roses, introducing many awarding winning new varieties. The new company, Meilland-Richardier grew into Meilland International (AKA House of Meilland), and is located in Le Luc en Provence, France. Francis and Louisette's children, Alain and Michele, are both successful rose breeders for the company. Meilland International continues to be 100% family owned and managed.

=== 'Michele Meilland' ===
'Michele Meilland' was developed by Francis Meilland in 1945 and was introduced in France by Meilland International in 1948. Meilland developed the rose cultivar by crossing hybrid teas, 'Joanna Hill' and 'Peace'. He named the rose after his daughter, Michele, who was born in 1943. 'Michele Meilland was named the most beautiful rose in France in 1945. The rose was used to hybridize six child plants: 'Confidence' (1951), 'Lido di Roma' (1968), 'Princess Margaret of England' (1968), 'Mitsouko' (1970), 'Puerta del Sol' (1971), and 'Grand Siecle' (1976). Francis Meilland introduced a climbing sport of 'Michele Meilland' in 1951, which he named 'Grampant Michele Meilland'.

== Sources ==
- Harkness, Jack (1985). The Maker of Heavenly Roses. ISBS. ISBN 978-0285626546.
- Quest-Ritson, Brigid; Quest-Ritson, Charles (2003). Encyclopedia of Roses. DK Publishing. ISBN 978-0756688684.
