= Rosa 'George Dickson' =

Red hybrid tea rose cultivar

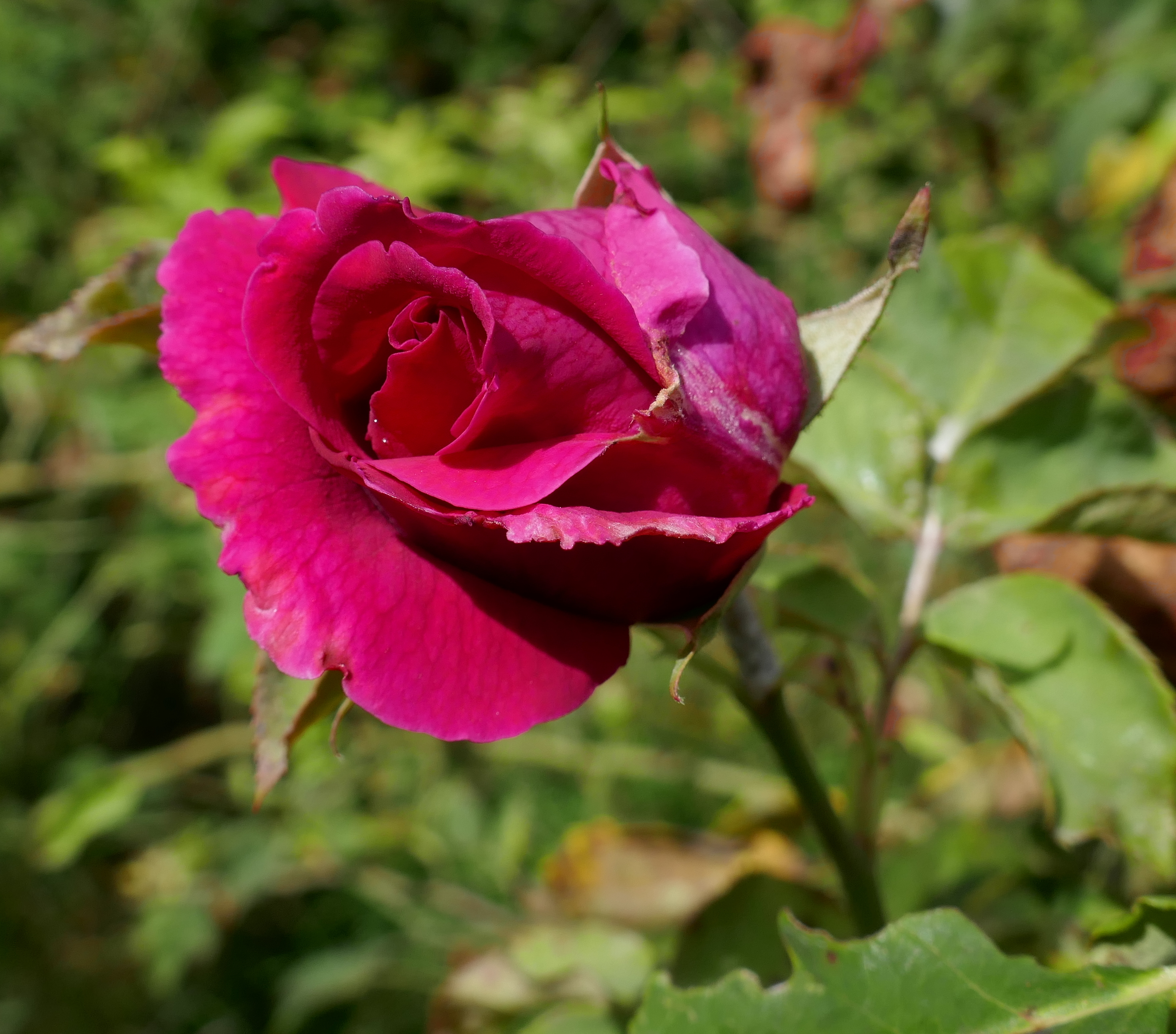
- Cultivar group: Hybrid Tea
- Cultivar: Rosa 'George Dickson'
- Breeder: Alexander Dickson II (1857-1949)
- Origin: Northern Ireland, 1912

Rosa 'George Dickson' is a medium red hybrid tea rose bred by Alexander Dickson II of Northern Ireland in 1912. It was one of the Dickson nursery's early commercial successes and was a popular rose with the public. It was awarded the Royal National Rose Society (RNRS) gold medal in 1911 and is an ancestor of the legendary 'Peace' rose.

== Description ==
'George Dickson' is a tall upright shrub, 5 to 7 ft (1.5–2.1 m) in height, with a 2 to 3 ft (0.61–0.91 m) spread. It has large 5 in (130 mm) petals and a strong, sweet fragrance. Flowers are cupped and cabbage-like when they first open, but later disintegrate into a mass of petals. Flowers are medium red with a dark red reverse. Blooms are borne singly or in small, condensed clusters. The plant has long stems and can be used as a short climber. Leaves are large and dull green and are prone to mildew.

== History ==
=== Dickson Roses ===
The Dickson family of Newtownards, County Down, Northern Ireland is the oldest rose breeding family in the UK. The family nursery was established in 1836 by Alexander Dickson (1801—1880). His son George (1832-1914) founded the rose nursery, Alexander Dickson and Sons and his son Hugh (1831—1904) established a separate rose nursery in 1869 called Royal Nurseries. George's sons, Alexander II (1857-1949) and George II took over the company from their father in 1872. George and sons, Alexander II and George II, began breeding roses in 1879. In 1886, Alexander II took the family's first rose cultivars to London, but early cultivars were not promising. Over time, Alexander II and George Ii developed a system of rose breeding that yielded better results. The family's first commercial success was the pink hybrid tea, 'Mrs. W.J. Grant' (1892) and this popular rose was followed by the dark red hybrid teas, 'Liberty' (1902) and 'George Dickson (1912). Alexander II retired in 1930. The family nursery continued until 2018, when the business stopped commercially breeding roses.

=== 'George Dickson' ===
Alexander II Dickson developed 'George Dickson' in 1912. He named the cultivar in honor of his father, George. Lineage is unknown. The rose has been popular with the public for over 100 years, because of its hardiness and profusion of flowers.. 'George Dickson' was awarded the Royal National Rose Society (RNRS) gold medal in 1911. 'George Dickson' is one of the ancestors of the legendary hybrid tea rose, 'Peace'. 'Peace', originally named 'Mme. A. Meilland', was developed from a multiple cross between ('George Dickson' x 'Souvenir de Claudius Pernet') x ('Joanna Hill' x 'Charles P. Kilham')) x 'Margaret McGredy'
