= Rosa 'Charles P. Kilham' =

Orange-red hybrid tea rose cultivar

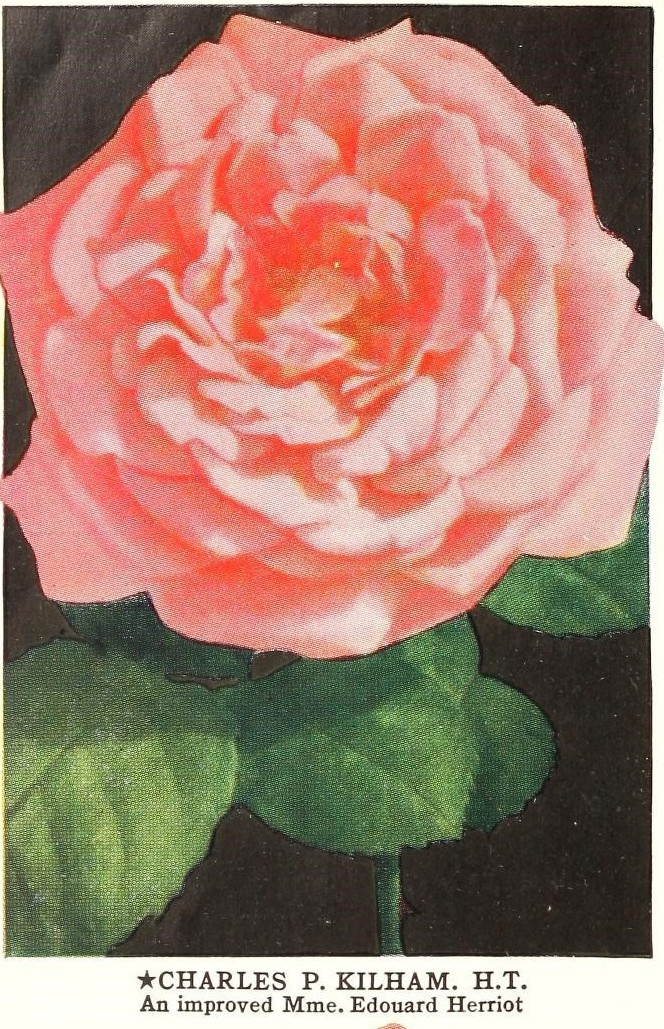
- Rosa 'Charles P. Kilham'
- Genus: Rosa hybrid
- Hybrid parentage: Unknown lineage
- Cultivar group: Hybrid tea
- Breeder: Samuel McGredy III
- Origin: Ireland, before 1926

Rosa 'Charles P. Kilham' is an orange-red hybrid tea rose, bred by Irish rose breeder, Samuel McGredy III before 1926. The rose was introduced in France in 1926 and Australia in 1927. It won the Royal National Rose Society (RNRS) gold medal in 1927. 'Charles P. Kilham' is one of the ancestors of the legendary hybrid tea rose, 'Peace'.

== Description ==
'Charles P. Kilham' is a vigorous, bushy, upright hybrid tea rose with large, full (26–40) petals, born mostly solitary. Buds open to flowers that are orange-red with yellow shading. The rose has a moderate tea fragrance and has dark green foliage. The rose has long, sturdy stems and is nearly thornless. It blooms continuously throughout the season. 'Charles P. Kilham' is disease resistant and does well in the rain.

== History ==
=== McGredy roses ===
The Sam McGredy family represents four generations of rose hybridizers from Northern Ireland. The first Samuel McGredy (1828 –1903), established the family nursery in Portadown, County Armagh. Originally, the head gardener at a large estate, in 1888, McGredy moved his family to Portadown, leased 10 acres with a greenhouse and established a nursery with his son, Samuel II (1861–1926). The nursery sold a variety of plants, but they were best known for their fruit trees and show pansies.

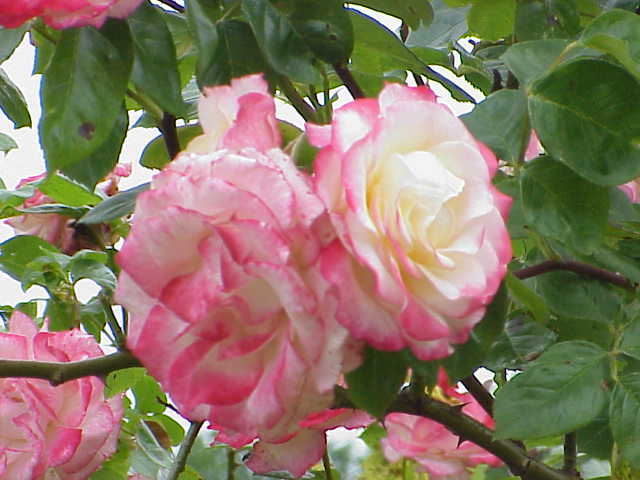
'Handel' 1960

Samuel McGredy II began breeding roses in 1895. He submitted his first roses at the National Rose Society in London in 1905, where he won his first gold medal, the salmon-pink, "Countess of Gosford" rose. He produced many award-winning roses during his career as a rose breeder. McGredy was awarded the National Rose Society's Dean Hole Medal in 1921. The business passed to his son, Samuel McGredy III (1897–1934), after Samuel II's death in 1926. Samuel III (Sam) expanded rose production at the company. He named many roses after family members. The nursery's rose breeding program declined after McGredy's early death of a heart attack at the age of 38 and the beginning of World War II. His son, Samuel IV was two years old at the time of his father's death.

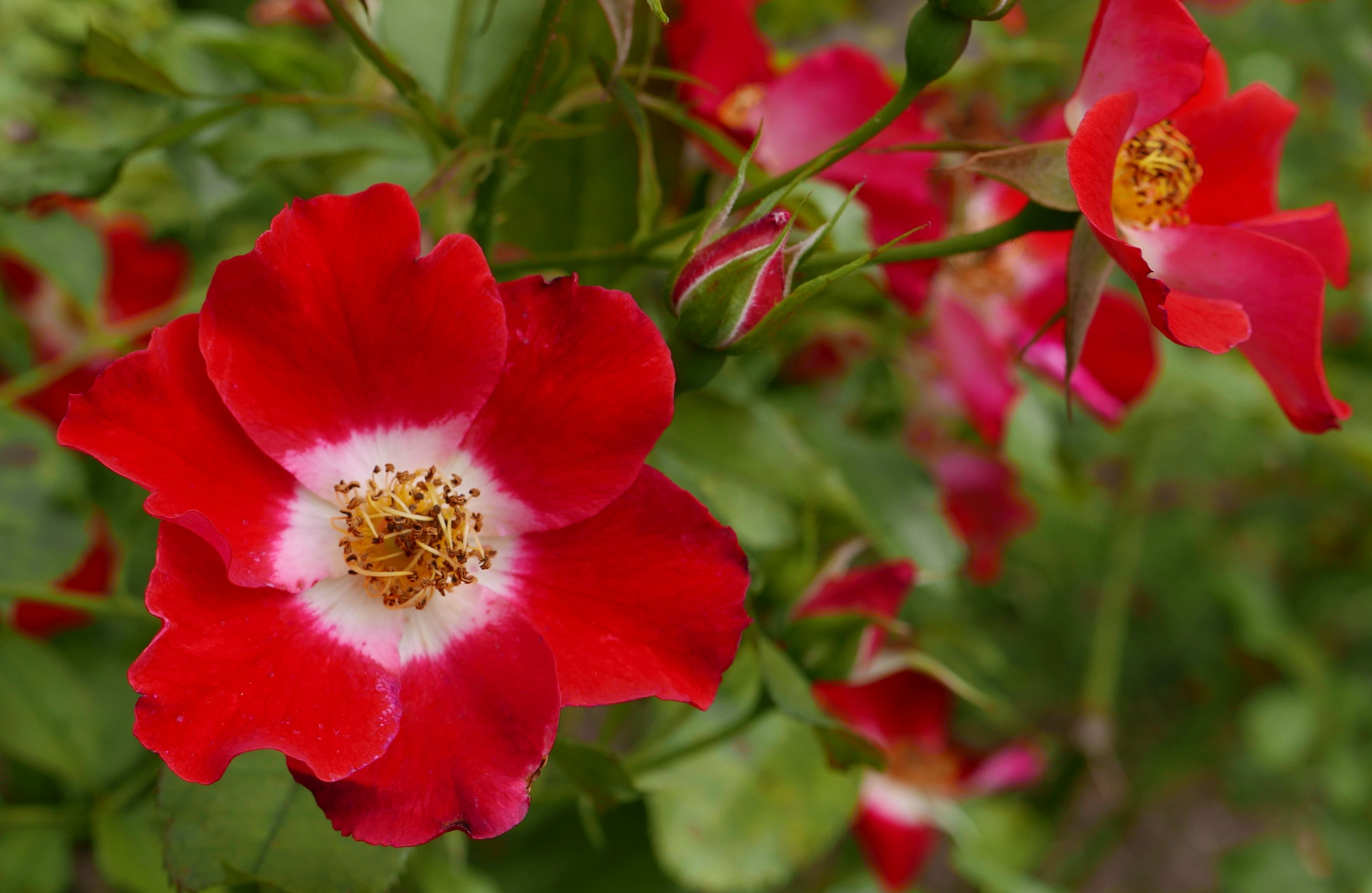
Rosa 'Eye Paint', 1976

When Samuel McGredy IV (Sam) (1931–2019) took over the family business in 1952, he knew very little about rose breeding. He sought out the renowned rose hybridizers at the time: Reimer Kordes from Germany, Eugene Boerner from the United States and Niels Poulsen from Denmark, in order to educate himself on modern rose hybridization. Soon after, he created a new rose breeding program at the nursery. McGredy's first commercial success was his Gold Medal winner, floribunda rose, 'Orangeade' in 1959. During the 1960s, McGredy was best known for his hybrid tea and floribunda roses.

In 1972, alarmed over the increasing political violence in Northern Ireland, McGredy and his family moved to Auckland, New Zealand. He transplanted his nursery stock and renamed the company, McGredy Roses International. New Zealand's climate, ideal for plant cultivation, allowed McGredy to breed roses outdoors without greenhouses. He soon introduced a new series of what he called 'hand painted' roses, brightly coloured striped roses and roses splashed with two or more colours. Some of his most popular rose cultivars include Rosa 'Dublin Bay, Rosa 'Sexy Rexy', Rosa 'Olympiad' and Rosa 'Handel'. When McGredy retired in 2007, he closed the nursery. He died in 2019.

=== 'Charles P. Kilham' ===
'Charles P. Kilham' was developed by Samuel McGredy III before 1926. The cultivar's lineage is unknown. It was introduced in the United States in 1928 and in Australia in 1930. It won the Royal National Rose Society (RNRS) gold medal in 1927. 'Charles P. Kilham' is one of the ancestors of the legendary hybrid tea rose, 'Peace'. 'Peace', originally named 'Mme. A. Meilland', was developed from a multiple cross between (('George Dickson' x 'Souvenir de Claudius Pernet') x ('Joanna Hill' x Charles P. Kilham)) x 'Margaret McGredy'

== Sources ==
- Phillips, Roger; Rix, Martyn (1993). The Quest for the Rose. New York: Random House. ISBN 978-0-679-43573-0.
- Harkness, Jack (1985). The Maker of Heavenly Roses. ISBS. ISBN 978-0285626546.
- McFarland, John (1958). Modern Roses Volume V. J. McFarland Co. p. 220.
- Quest-Ritson, Brigid; Quest-Ritson, Charles (1993). Encyclopedia of Roses. DK Publishing. ISBN 978-0756688684.
