= Alfred Conard =

Alfred Conard can refer to:

- Alfred Fellenberg Conard (1835 – 1906), horticulturalist and founder of Star Roses and Plants/Conard-Pyle
- Alfred F. Conard, professor of law at University of Michigan, great-nephew of Alfred Fellenberg Conard and son of Henry Shoemaker Conard
