= Rosa 'Peace' =

Hybrid tea rose cultivar

Rosa 'Madame A. Meilland' (Peace)
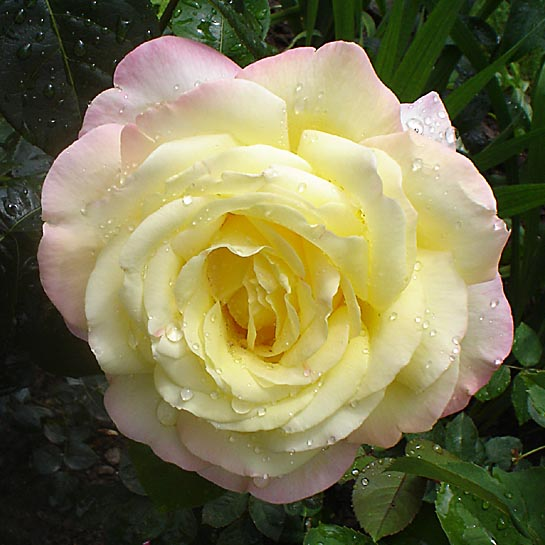
- Genus: Rosa
- Hybrid parentage: Unnamed seedling × 'Margaret McGredy'
- Cultivar group: Hybrid tea
- Cultivar: 'Peace'
- Marketing names: Gioia, Gloria Dei, Mme A. Meilland
- Origin: Francis Meilland, France, 1935 to 1939

The Peace rose, formally Rosa 'Peace', synonym Mme A. Meilland, is a well-known and successful garden rose. By 1992, over one hundred million plants of this hybrid tea had been sold. The cultivar has large flowers of a light yellow to cream color, slightly flushed at the petal edges with crimson-pink. It is hardy and vigorous and relatively resistant to disease, making it popular in gardens as well as in the floral trade.

It was developed by French horticulturist Francis Meilland, in the years 1935 to 1939. When Meilland foresaw the German invasion of France, he sent cuttings to friends in Italy, Turkey, Germany, and the United States to protect the new rose. It is said that it was sent to the US on the last plane available before the German invasion, where it was safely propagated by the Conard Pyle Co. during the war.

== Development ==
The cultivar was hybridized in 1935, receiving the number 3-35-40 (the third hybridization in 1935, and the 40th cultivar selected for test proliferation). As those first tests produced beautiful flowers in autumn of 1936, the first no. 3-35-40 were grown in Meilland's rose fields in June 1939. That summer, cuttings were sent to partners in other countries. According to Meilland's records, 'Madame A. Meilland' was hybridized from the hybrid tea 'Margaret McGredy' and an unnamed seedling.

'George Dickson'; Alexander Dickson II 1912
Unnamed seedling
'Souvenir de Claudius Pernet'; J. Pernet-Ducher 1920
Unnamed seedling
'Joanna Hill; Joseph H. Hill 1928
Unnamed seedling
'Charles P. Kilham'; Samuel McGredy III 1926
Rosa 'Madame A. Meilland'
'Margaret McGredy'; Samuel McGredy III 1927

== Naming ==
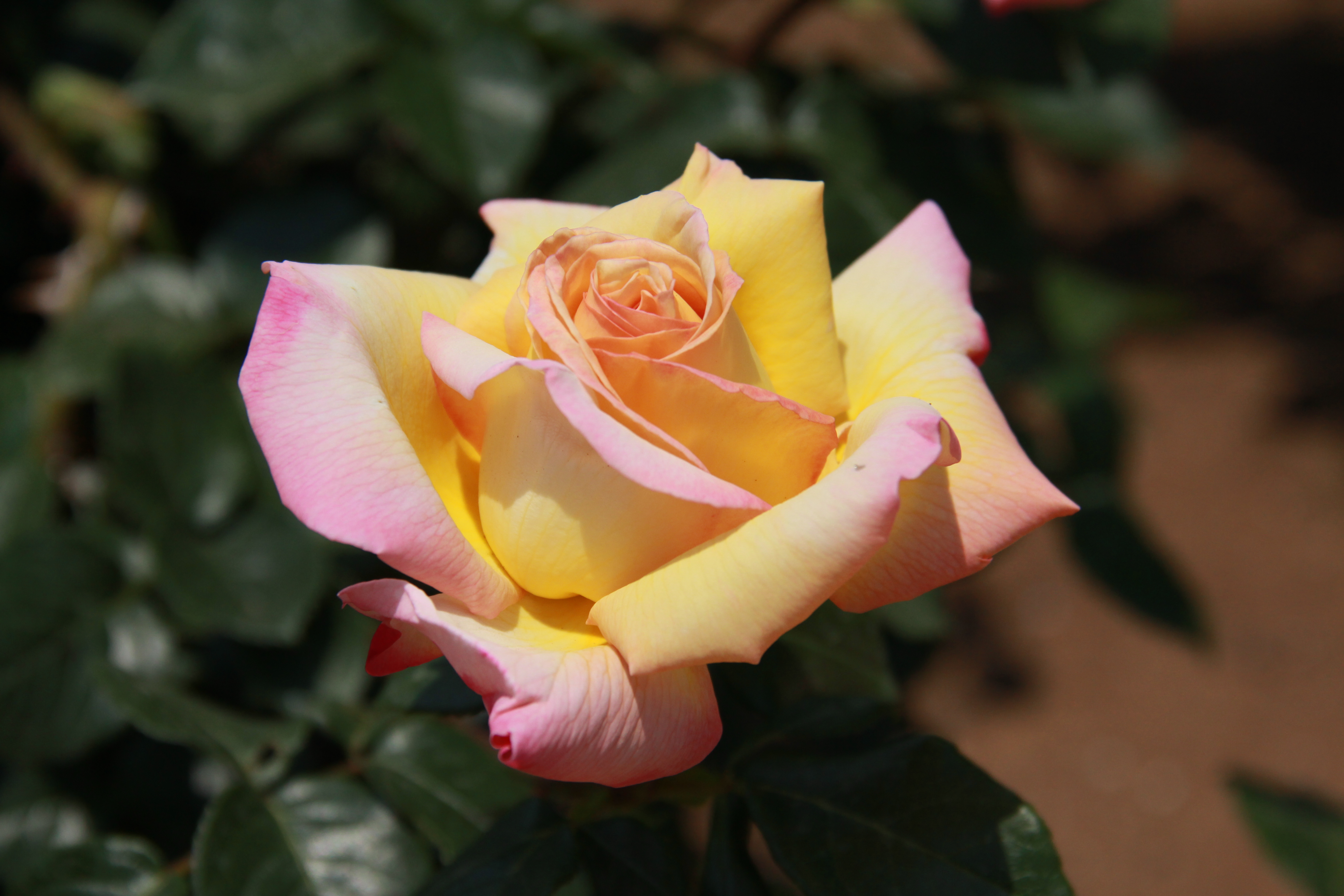
Rosa 'Madame A. Meilland' (Peace)

Because Meilland had sent out his cuttings just before the war, communication between the cultivators was not possible, which is why the rose received different names. In France, Francis and Alain Meilland decided to call the cultivar 'Madame A. Meilland', in honor of Francis' deceased mother, Antoine Meilland's wife, Claudia. This is the formal cultivar name. Other names are considered by the International Code of Nomenclature for Cultivated Plants as trade or selling names. In Italy it was called Gioia (Italian for "joy"), in Germany Gloria Dei (Latin for "glory of God") and in the US, Sweden, and Norway Peace.

The rose eventually became known as Peace. In early 1945 rose grower Meilland wrote to Field Marshal Alan Brooke (later Viscount Alanbrooke) to thank him for his key part in the liberation of France and to ask if Brooke would give his name to the rose. Brooke declined saying that, though he was honored to be asked, his name would soon be forgotten and a much better and more enduring name would be "Peace".

The adoption of the trade name "Peace" was publicly announced in the United States on 29 April 1945 by the introducers, Conard Pyle Co. This was the very day that Berlin fell, a day considered a turning point in the Second World War in Europe. Later that year Peace roses were given to each of the delegations at the inaugural meeting of the United Nations in San Francisco, each with a note that read:

"We hope the 'Peace' rose will influence men’s thoughts for everlasting world peace".

Peter Beales, English rose grower and expert, said in his book Roses:

"'Peace', without doubt, is the finest Hybrid Tea ever raised and it will remain a standard variety forever".

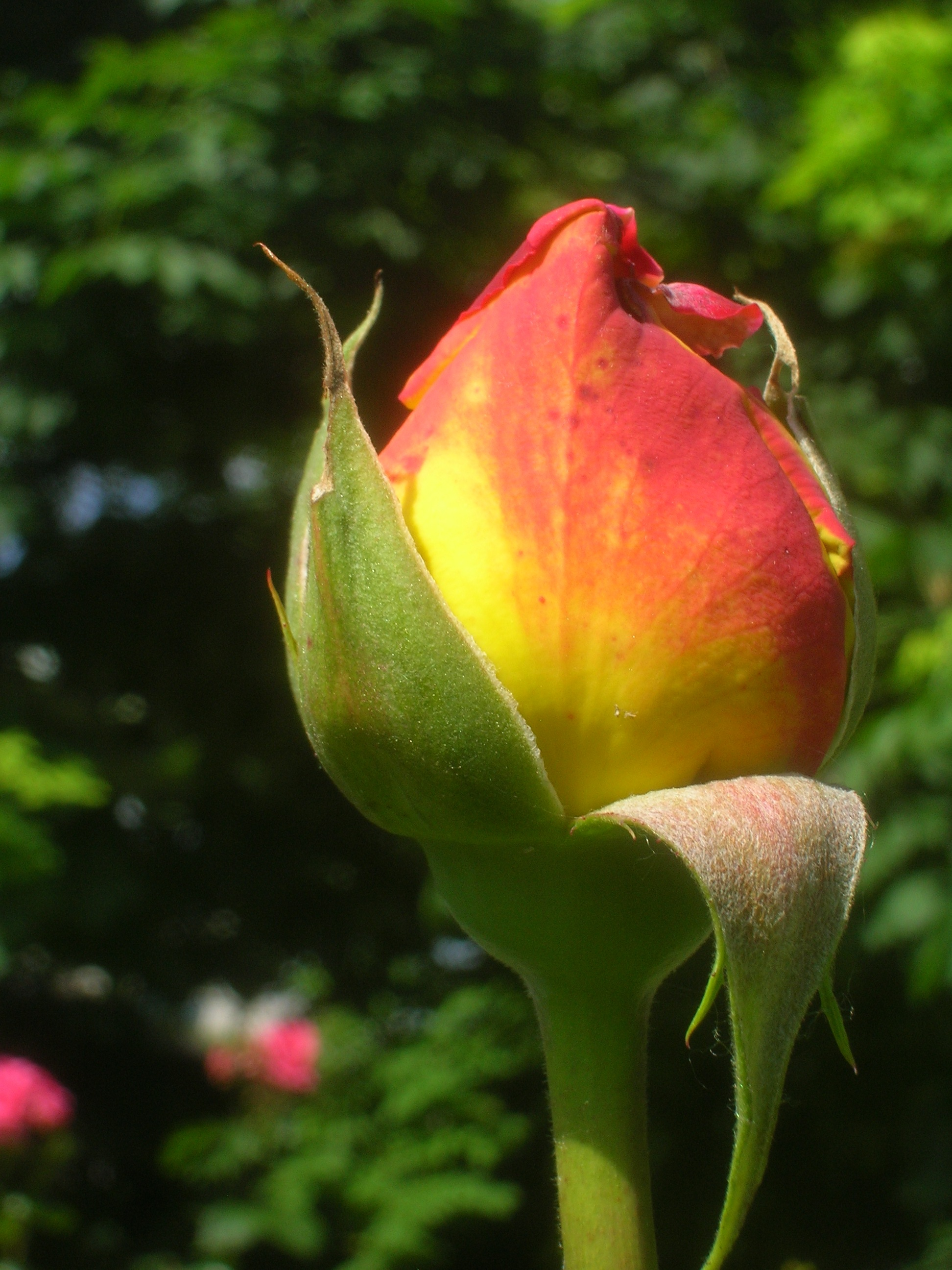
'Mme A. Meilland' bud

== Description ==
'Mme A. Meilland' forms elegant buds that open to large, cupped flowers with a high-centered form and an average diameter of 15 cm (5.9 in). Their color is a combination of pale yellow and crimson edges that depends on the location, the weather and changes as the flower fades. The durable flowers are very full, with 40 to 43 petals, survive rainy periods, and have a sweet and fruity fragrance that varies in its strength from mild to strong. The cultivar flowers continuously throughout the season up to the first frost.

The vigorous shrub grows 120 to 200 cm (4 to 6 1/2 ft) high and 90 to 125 cm (2 ft 11 in to 4 ft 1 in) wide, is winter hardy down to −23 °C or −9 °F (USDA zone 6), half-shade tolerant, and disease resistant. The large, glossy leaves are very dark and leathery. 'Mme A. Meilland' is very versatile—it is used as cut rose and as garden rose, solitarily or in groups, as standard rose to 90 cm (3.0 ft) high, or in containers.

== Awards ==
'Mme A. Meilland' has been granted numerous awards, starting with the selection as Most Beautiful French Rose in Lyon in 1942, gold medals in Lyon (1942), Portland (1944), The Hague (1965) and from the Royal National Rose Society in 1947. In 1944, it was included in the All-America Rose Selection.

In 1976, it was the first cultivar to be granted the highest award a rose can be granted when it was selected as World's Favorite Rose and included into the Rose Hall of Fame.

In 2018, the U.S. Postal Service issued a new Forever stamp celebrating the Peace Rose. The dedication ceremony was held at The Gardens of the American Rose Center in Shreveport, Louisiana.

== Sports and hybrid offspring ==
As an often cultivated plant, several sports of 'Mme A. Meilland' are known. 'Climbing Peace' (Kordes 1951) has slightly bigger flowers but flowers less well, 'Chicago Peace' (Johnston 1962) differs mainly in its richer colors with a mixture of crimson and apricot, while 'Kronenbourg' (syn. 'Flaming Peace', McGredy 1966) has red petals with yellow backs, creating an interesting contrast.

It is also used in the hybridization of new cultivars, and played a role in the development of well known cultivars such as 'Garden Party' (Swim, 1959), 'Super Star' (Tantau, 1960), and 'Love and Peace' (Lim & Twomey, 1991).

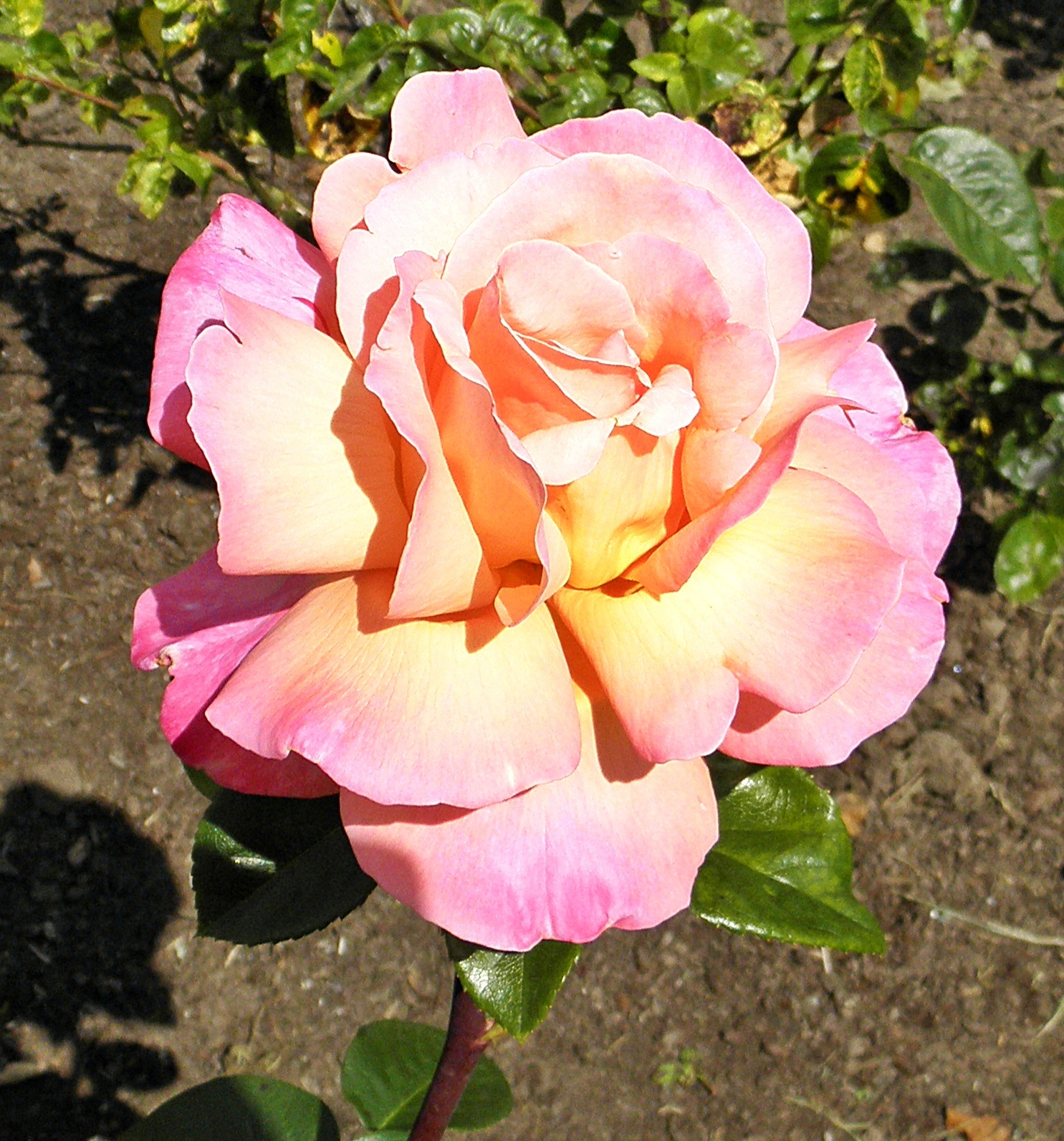
'Lucky Piece' (Gordon 1958)

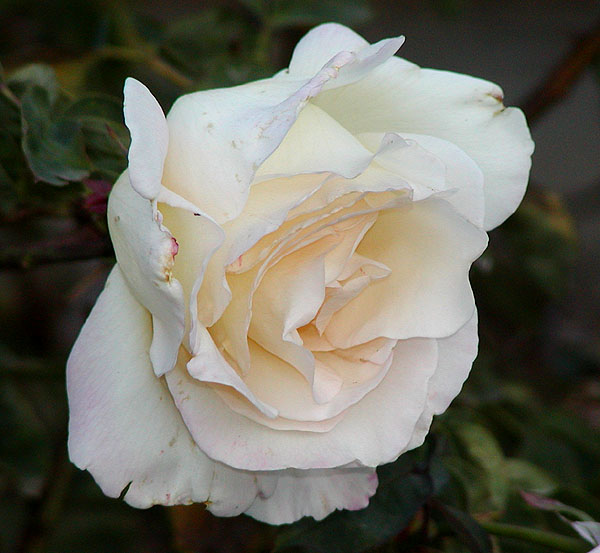
'Garden Party' (Swim 1959)

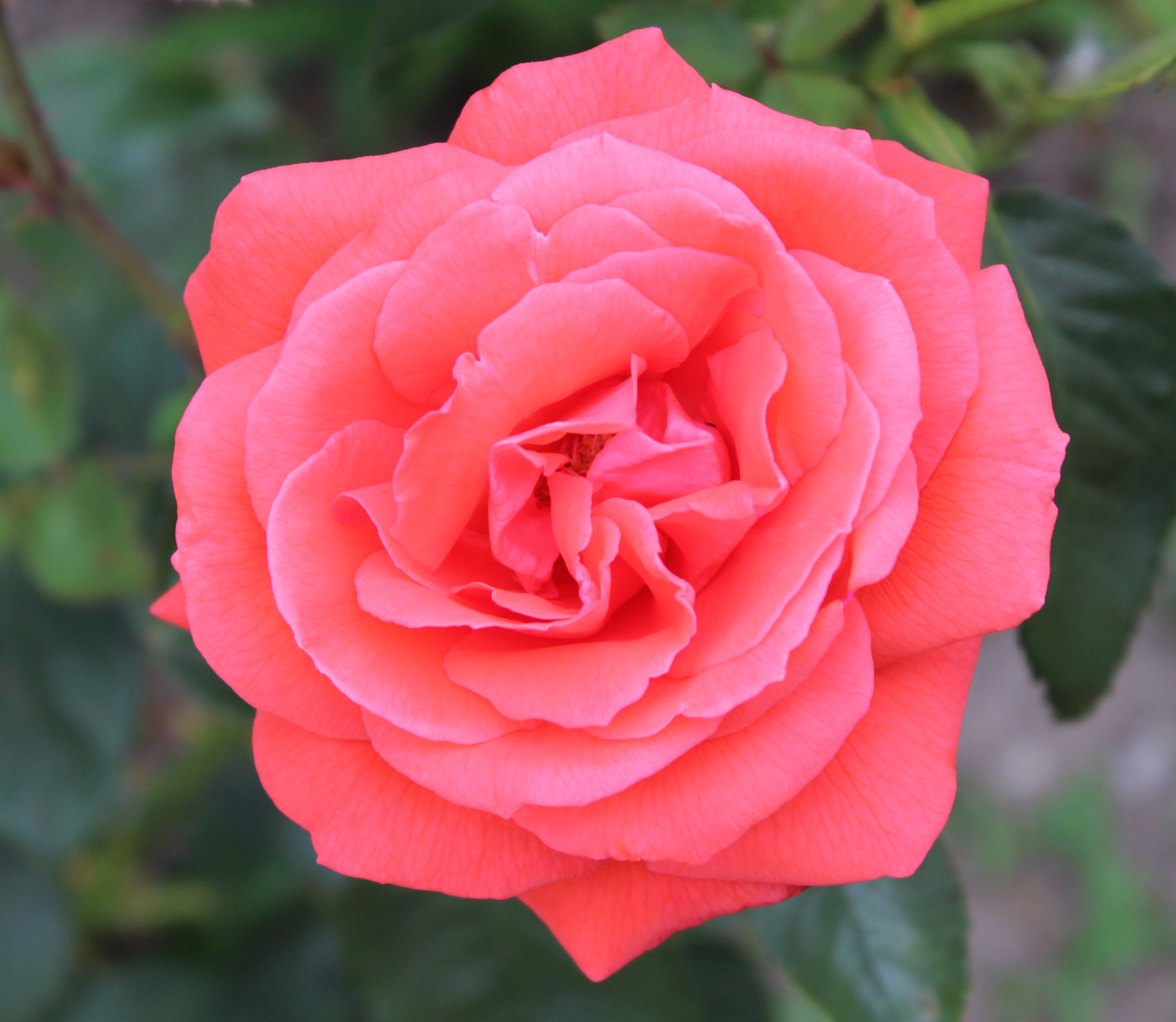
'Super Star'
(Tantau 1960)

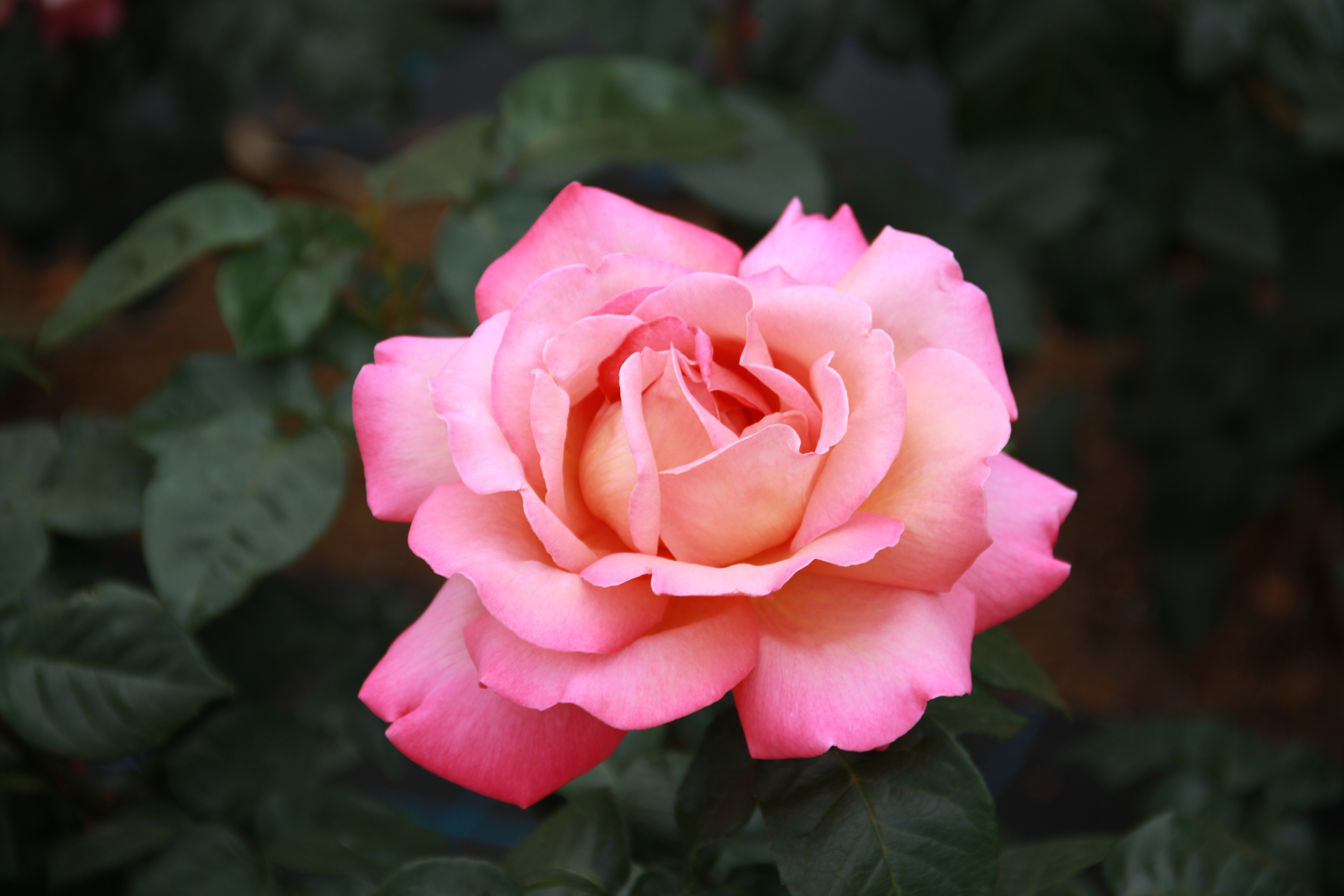
'Chicago Peace'
(Johnston 1962)

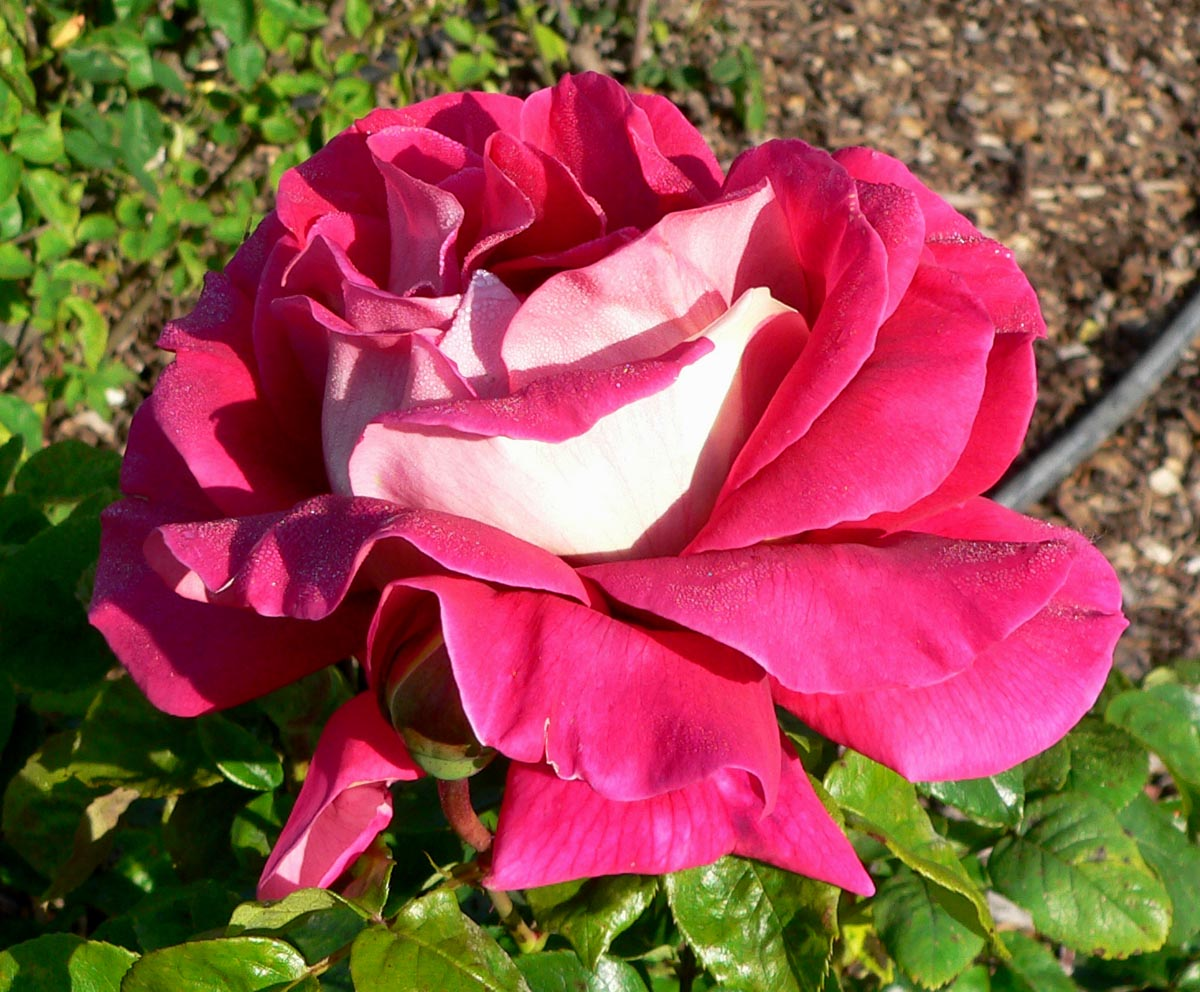
'Kronenbourg'
(McGredy 1966)

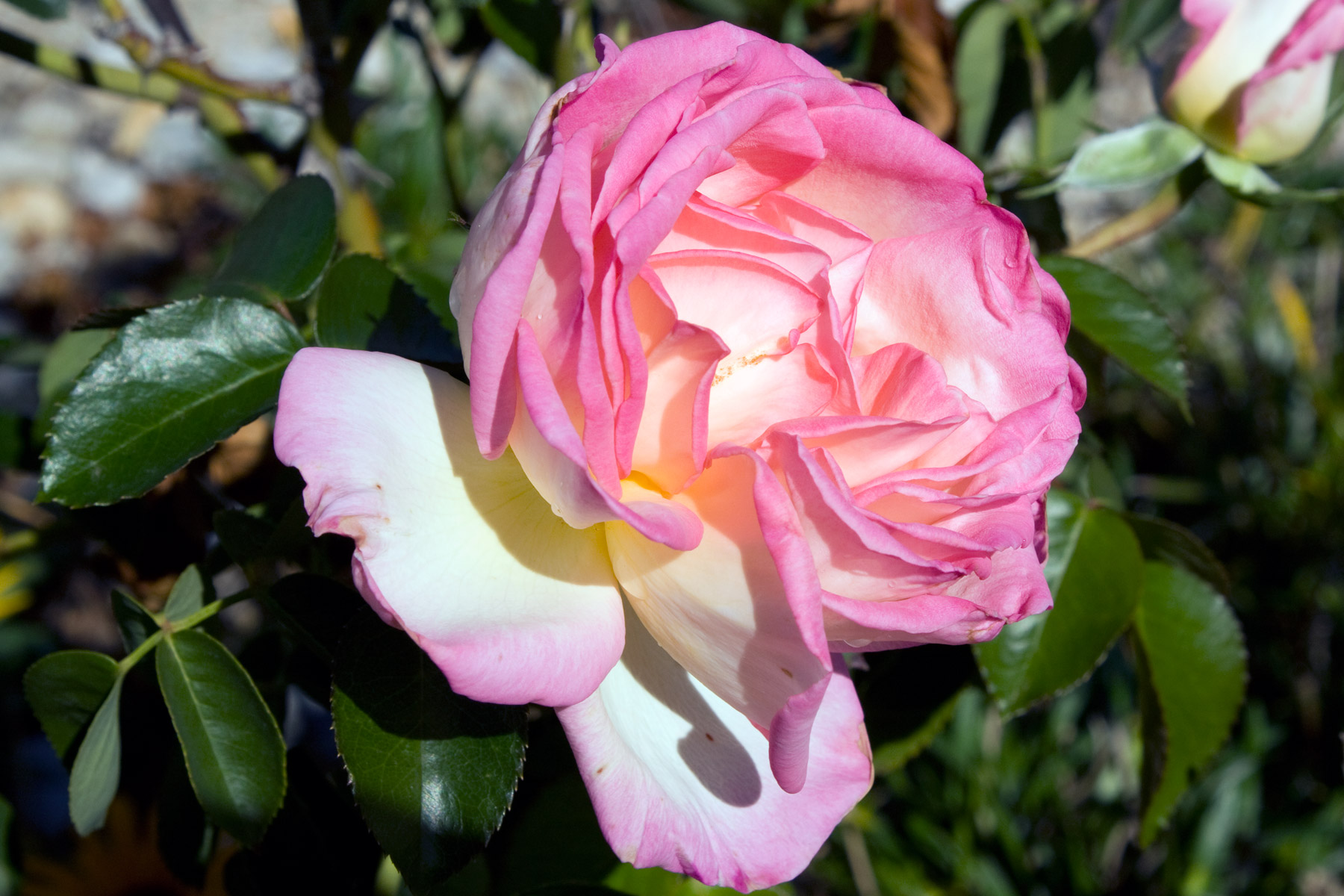
'Princesse de Monaco'
(Meilland 1981)

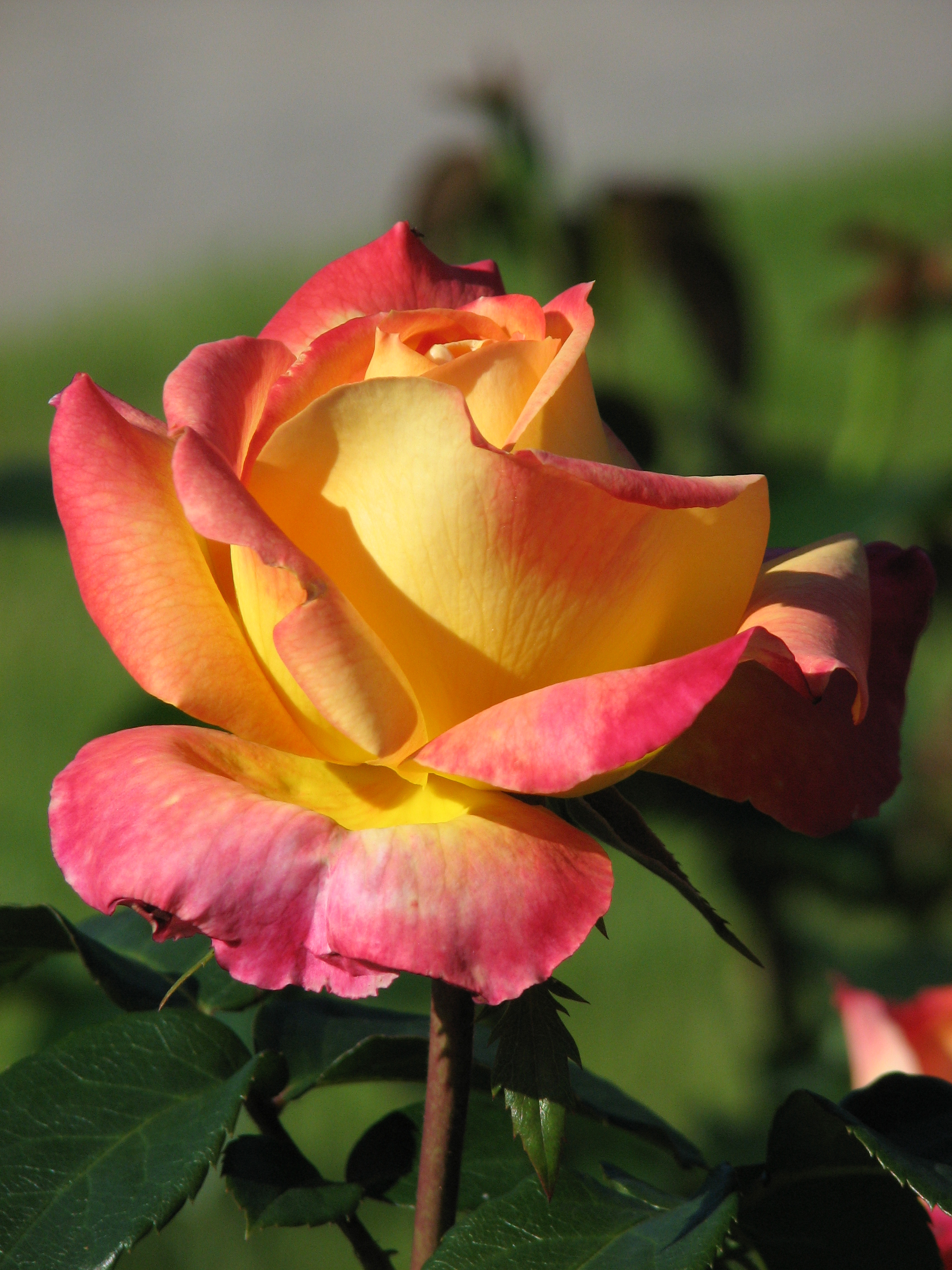
'Love and Peace'
(Lim & Twomey 1991)

== See also ==
- The Peace rose's 1942 US patent.
