= Fellenberg =

Fellenberg may refer to:

- Alfred Fellenberg Conard
- Philipp Emanuel von Fellenberg
