= Edward Gurney Hill =

American nurseryman and rose breeder

Edward Gurney (E. G.) Hill (1847–1933) was a nurseryman and rose breeder from Richmond, Indiana. He and his father, Joseph, established the Hill and Company nursery business in 1881. Hill later joined with his son, Joseph Herbert, to hybridize roses and produced many successful and popular rose varieties.

== Hill's family nurseries ==
=== Early years ===
Edward Gurney (E.G.) Hill was born in Rochdale, England 1847. His family emigrated to America in 1851, taking up residence in New York state. Hill's father, Joseph worked as a nurseryman, as did Hill when he became old enough to work. In 1870, Joseph took a job at Cascade Gardens Nursery in Richmond, Indiana. His family later joined him in Richmond.

=== Hill and Company ===
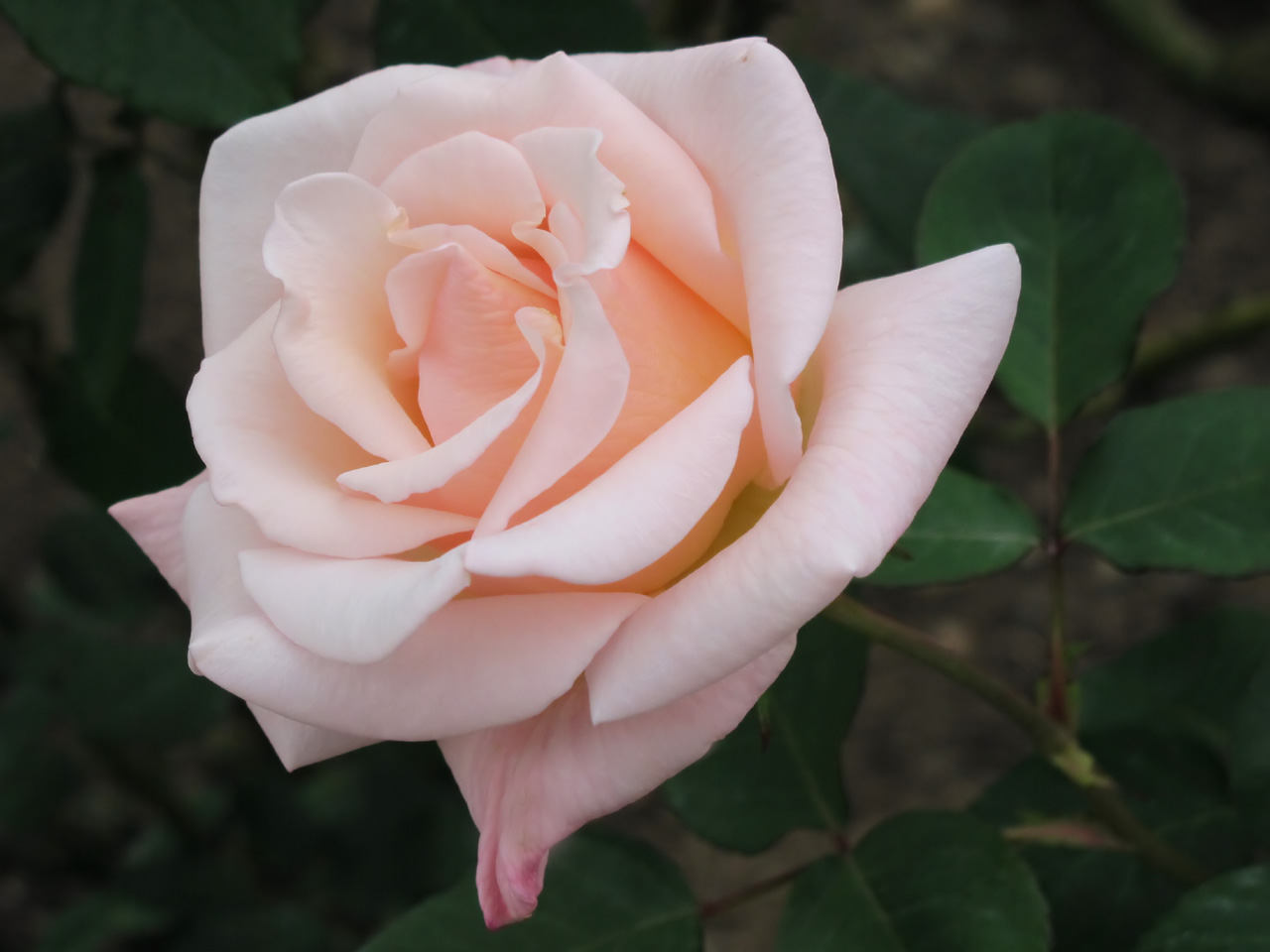
Rosa 'Madame Butterfly'

In 1881, E.G. and his father established a new nursery business, Hill and Company. with two greenhouses. By the 1890s, Hill and Company had moved its business to a larger location and incorporated as the E.G. Hill Co. The nursery produced many flowers, including roses, carnations, chrysanthemums and geraniums. E.G. began introducing European roses, and later began a rose hybridization program with his son Joseph Herbert. While visiting nurseryman William Paul in Waltham Cross, England in 1912, E.G. discovered an interesting seedling in Paul's rose fields. That seedling was later introduced by Paul as 'Ophelia' and became an important part of the Hill family's rose breeding program. In their nursery's rose fields, 'Ophelia' produced a sport, which the company introduced in 1918 as 'Madame Butterfly' and used the award-winning rose in their breeding program, producing a number of best selling roses, including 'Columbia' and 'Joanna Hill.

Hill was the first American rosarian to judge the annual Paris Rose Show. Known primarily for his best selling roses, E.G. also won awards for carnations, chrysanthemums, and geraniums during his long career. He was co-founder and president of the Society of American Florists, and he served as a president of the American Rose Society, the American Carnation Society, and the American Chysanthemum Society. He died in 1933. The city of Richmond built a fountain in E.G. Hill's honor in the Rose Garden at Glen Miller Park.

=== Joseph H. Hill ===
Joseph H. Hill joined Hill and Company at the age of 21. In 1916, he decided to start his own nursery business. He built greenhouses near Hill and Company's rose fields and named his new business, the Joseph H. Hill Co. Hill developed many successful and popular commercial roses during his career. In 1925, Joseph H., his father E.G. and two other relatives, Fred Lemon and Earl Mann, established a nursery wholesale distribution company, which they named the Hill Floral Products Company. The floral industry struggled during the Great Depression. Joseph introduced a new red rose in 1934, a sport of 'Columbia', that he named the 'Better Times' rose. This new cultivar, a beautiful red, thornless rose, made an excellent cut rose and proved to be a great commercial success for Hill and many florists nationwide. The Hill family businesses thrived during the 1940s, when the nursery grounds covered 1000 acres. After Hill's death in 1958, the two companies were managed by extended family, and continued until 2007 when both businesses permanently closed.

== Selected roses ==
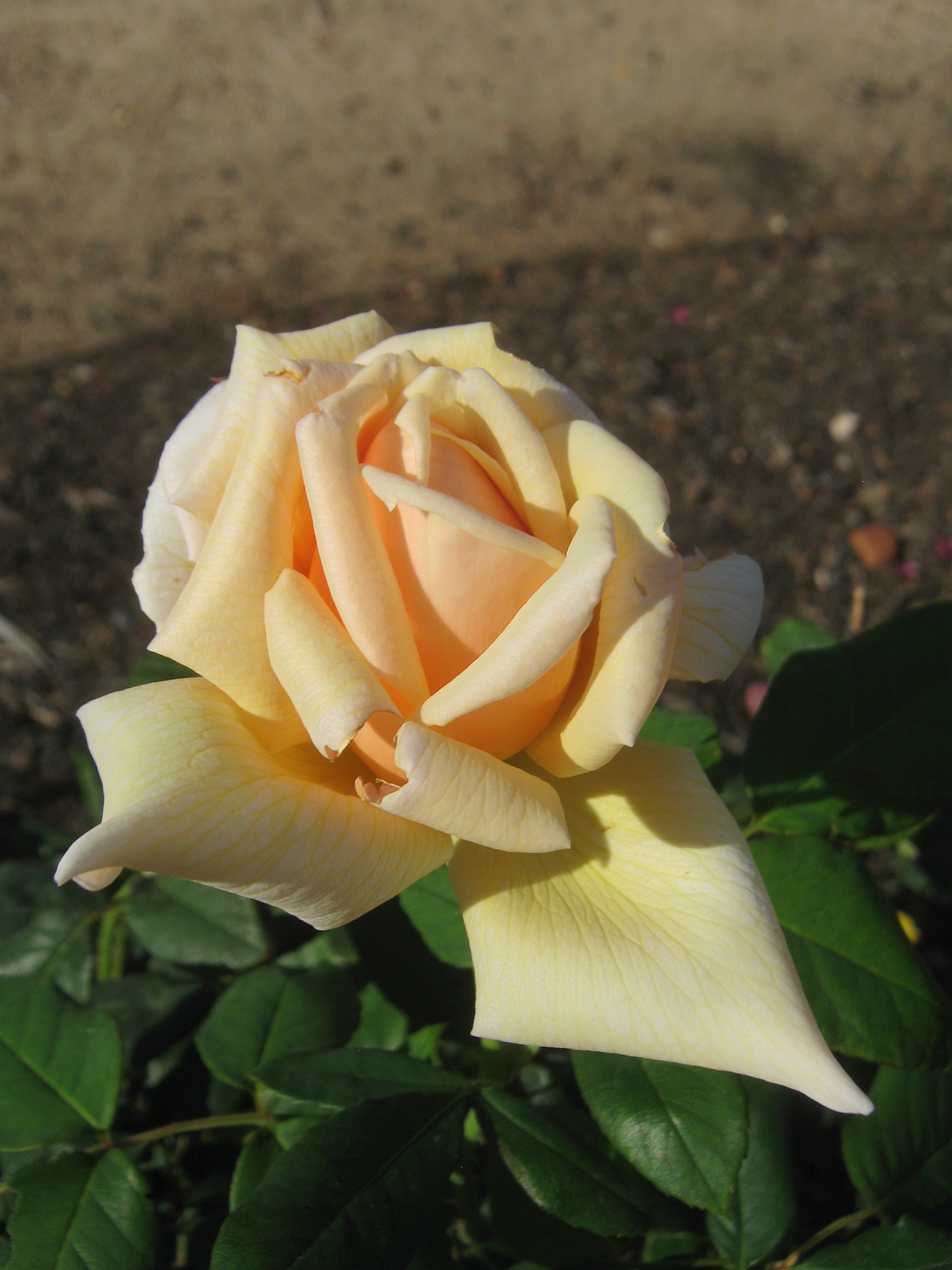
Rosa 'Joanna Hill'

- Rosa 'General McArthur' (E.G. Hill, 1901)
- Rosa 'Mark Twain' (E.G. Hill, 1902)
- Rosa 'Richmond' (E.G. Hill, 1904)
- Rosa 'Columbia' (E.G. Hill, 1917)
- Rosa 'Madame Butterfly' (E.G. Hill, sport, 1918)
- Rosa 'Premier' (E.G. Hill, 1918)
- Rosa 'Sensation' (Joseph H. Hill, 1922)
- Rosa 'Gold Mine' (Joseph H. Hill, 1925)
- 'Joanna Hill' (Joseph H. Hill, 1928)
- Rosa 'Blushing Bride' (Joseph H. Hill, 1930)

== Sources ==
- Lewis, Griffin (1931). Book of the Roses. Richard Badger. ASIN B000KFV95U.
- McCann, Sean (1993). The Rose: An Encyclopedia of North American Roses, Rosarians, and Rose Lore. Stackpole Books. ISBN 978-0811714907.
