= Rosa 'Love and Peace' =

Hybrid tea rose cultivar

Rosa 'Love & Peace'
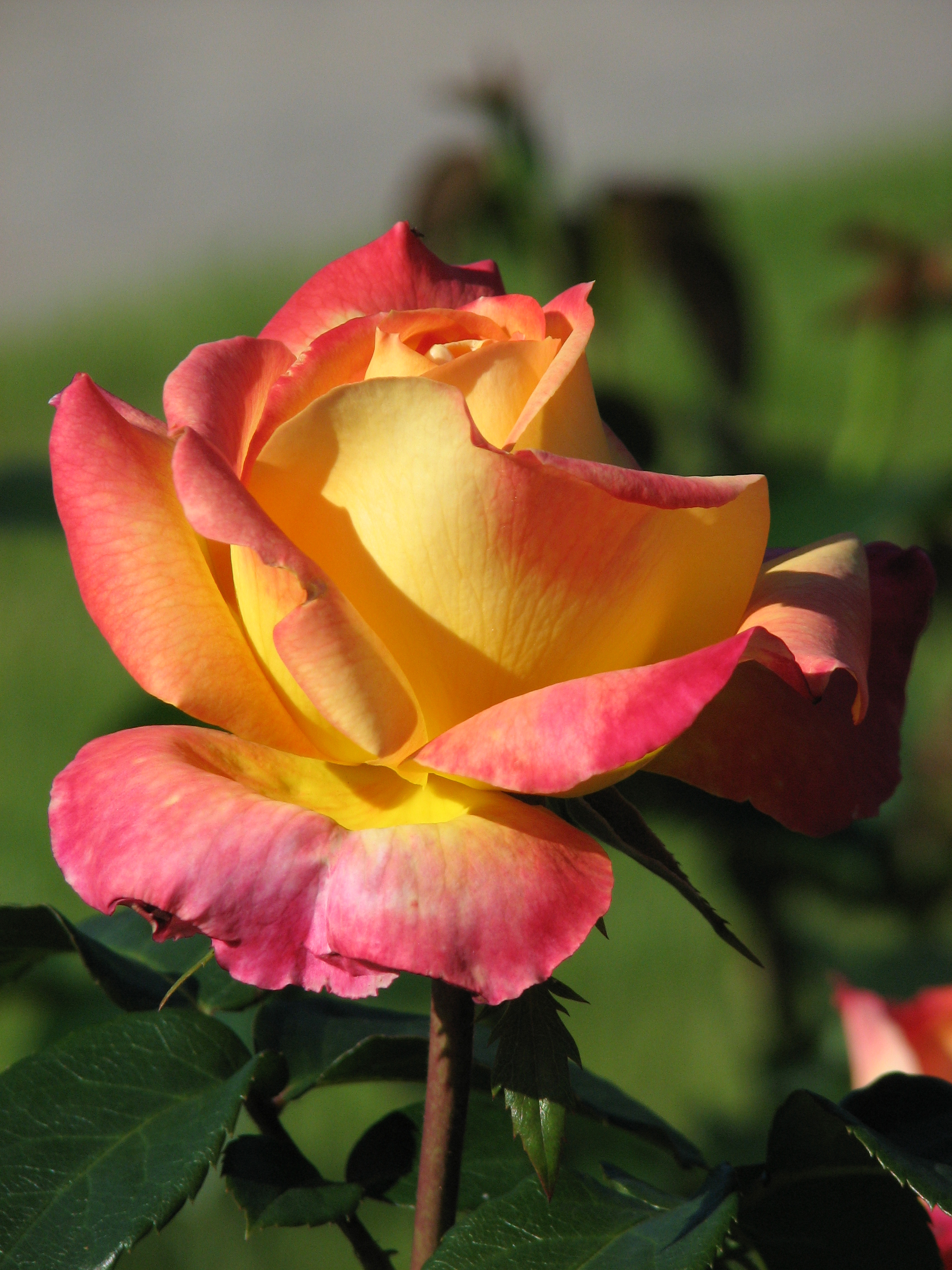
- Genus: Rosa hybrid
- Hybrid parentage: 'Unnamed seedling' x 'Mme. A. Meilland'
- Cultivar group: Hybrid tea rose
- Cultivar: BAIpeace
- Marketing names: 'Love & Peace' 'Pullman Orient Express'
- Breeder: Lim and Twomey
- Origin: United States, 1991

Rosa 'Love & Peace', (aka BAIpeace), is a hybrid tea rose cultivar bred in the United States by Ping Lim and Jerry Twomey in 1991. The rose was named an All-America Rose Selections winner in 2002.

== Description ==
'Love & Peace' is a medium-tall upright shrub, 4 to 6 ft (121—182 cm) in height with a 2 to 3 ft (60—90 cm) spread. Blooms are large, 6 in (15 cm) in diameter, with a high-centered bloom form. Flowers are lemon yellow with dark pink edges, and are typically borne singly, and more rarely in small clusters. The rose has a medium, fruity fragrance and large, dark green foliage. 'Love & Peace' is an outstanding exhibition rose as well as a good garden rose. It blooms in flushes from spring through fall. The plants does well in USDA zone 7 and warmer.

'Love & Peace' was used by Alain Meilland, in France, to hybridize, the hybrid tea Rosa, 'Mademoiselle Meilland', (2006). The cultivar's stock parents are: ('Christopher Columbus x 'Graham Thomas') x 'Love & Peace'.

== Awards ==
- All-America Rose Selections (AARS) winner, USA, (2002)

== See also ==
- Garden roses
- Rose Hall of Fame
- List of Award of Garden Merit roses
