= Rosa 'Elina' =

Rose cultivar

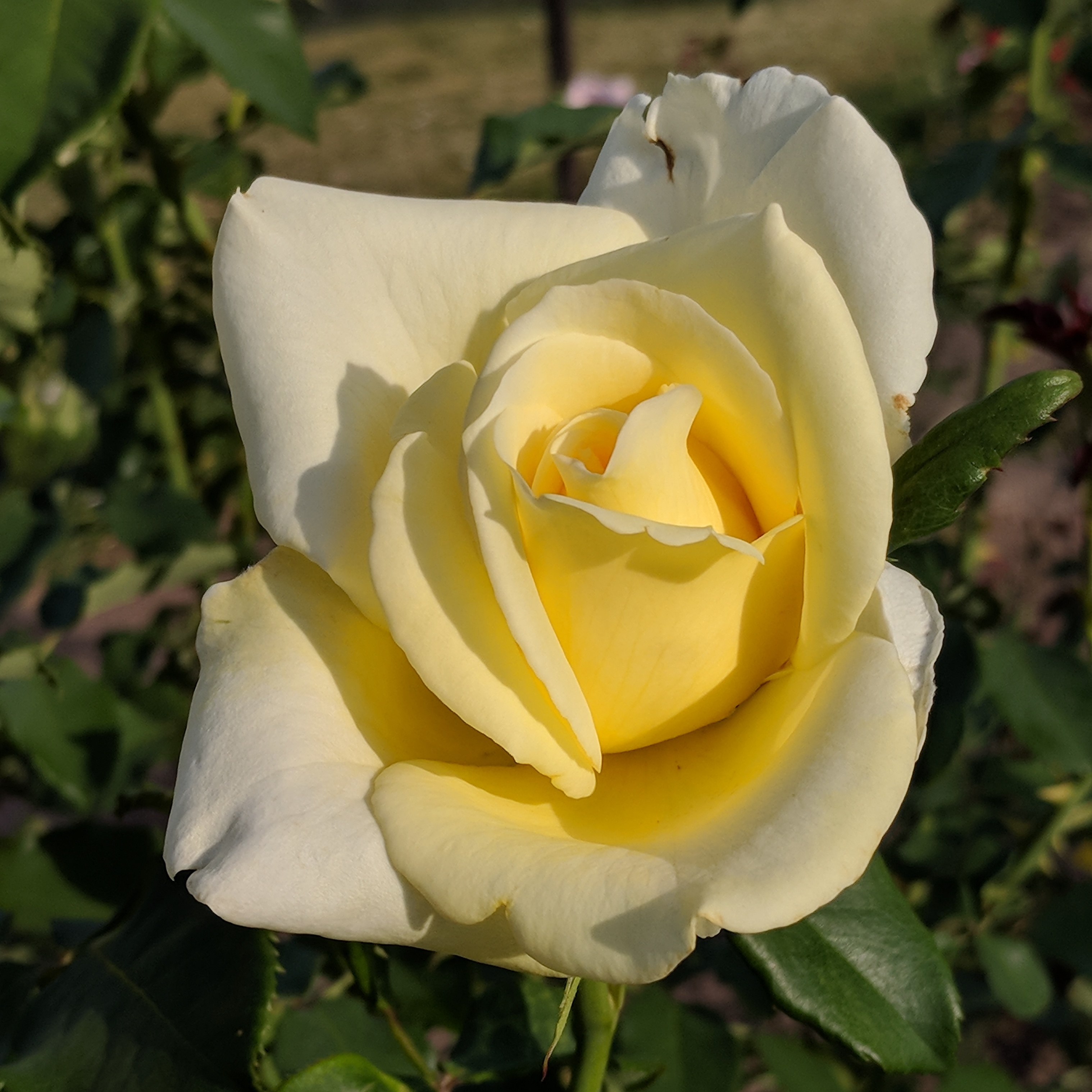
- Hybrid parentage: 'Nana Mouskouri' × 'Lolita'
- Cultivar group: Hybrid Tea
- Cultivar: 'DICjana'
- Marketing names: 'Elina', 'Peaudouce'
- Breeder: Patrick Dickson
- Origin: United Kingdom, 1983

Rosa 'Elina' (AKA 'DICjana') is a light yellow hybrid tea rose bred by Patrick Dickson of Northern Ireland in 1983. The variety was developed from the white floribunda 'Nana Mouskouri' (Dickson, 1975) and the apricot hybrid tea 'Lolita' (Kordes, 1972).

== History ==
Dickson Nurseries is a family owned rose company in Newtownards, County Down, Northern Ireland. The nursery was established in 1836 by Alexander Dickson (1801—1880). His son George (1832-1914) founded the rose nursery, Alexander Dickson and Sons and his son Hugh (1831—1904) established a separate rose nursery in 1869 called Royal Nurseries. George's sons, Alexander II (1857-1949) and George II took over the company from their father in 1872. Alexander II began breeding roses in 1879. The firm's name changed to Dicksons of Hawlmark and later became Dickson Nurseries in 1969.

Alexander Patrick (Patrick) Dickson (1926—2012), grandson of Alexander II, began working for Dickson Nurseries in 1957 and began hybridizing roses in 1958. During his career, Dickson developed many successful rose cultivars, including Rosa Sea Pearl, Rosa Irish Gold, Rosa 'Red Gold' (AARS) and Rosa 'Red Devil'. Dickson created the new rose cultivar, 'Elina' from the white floribunda 'Nana Mouskouri' (Dickson, 1975) and the apricot hybrid tea 'Lolita' (Kordes, 1972). The rose was later used to hybridize one child plant, floribunda Rosa Whisper.

== Description ==
'Elina' is a medium-sized bushy shrub, 4 to 5 ft (121–152 cm) in height, with a 2 to 3 ft spread (60–91 cm). Its mildly fragrant flowers are high centered, have 17 to 35 petals and an average diameter of 15 cm (6"). Bloom colour is weather dependent and can reach from lemon to ivory. The pointed, ovoid buds open to very large flowers with an elegant, opulent bloom form. They grow mostly solitary on long firm stems and appear quite late, but then almost continuously throughout the season. The bushy rose shrub has dense, glossy foliage.'Elina' is only moderately winter hardy (USDA zone 6b), a thrips favourite, but excepting mildew in humid conditions very disease resistant. Barlage recommends the plantation in groups or hedges.

== Awards ==
- ADR 1987
- New Zealand Gold Star of the South Pacific 1987
- James Mason Medal 1994
- The World's Favourite Rose 2006
