= Dickson Roses =

Rose nursery in Northern Ireland

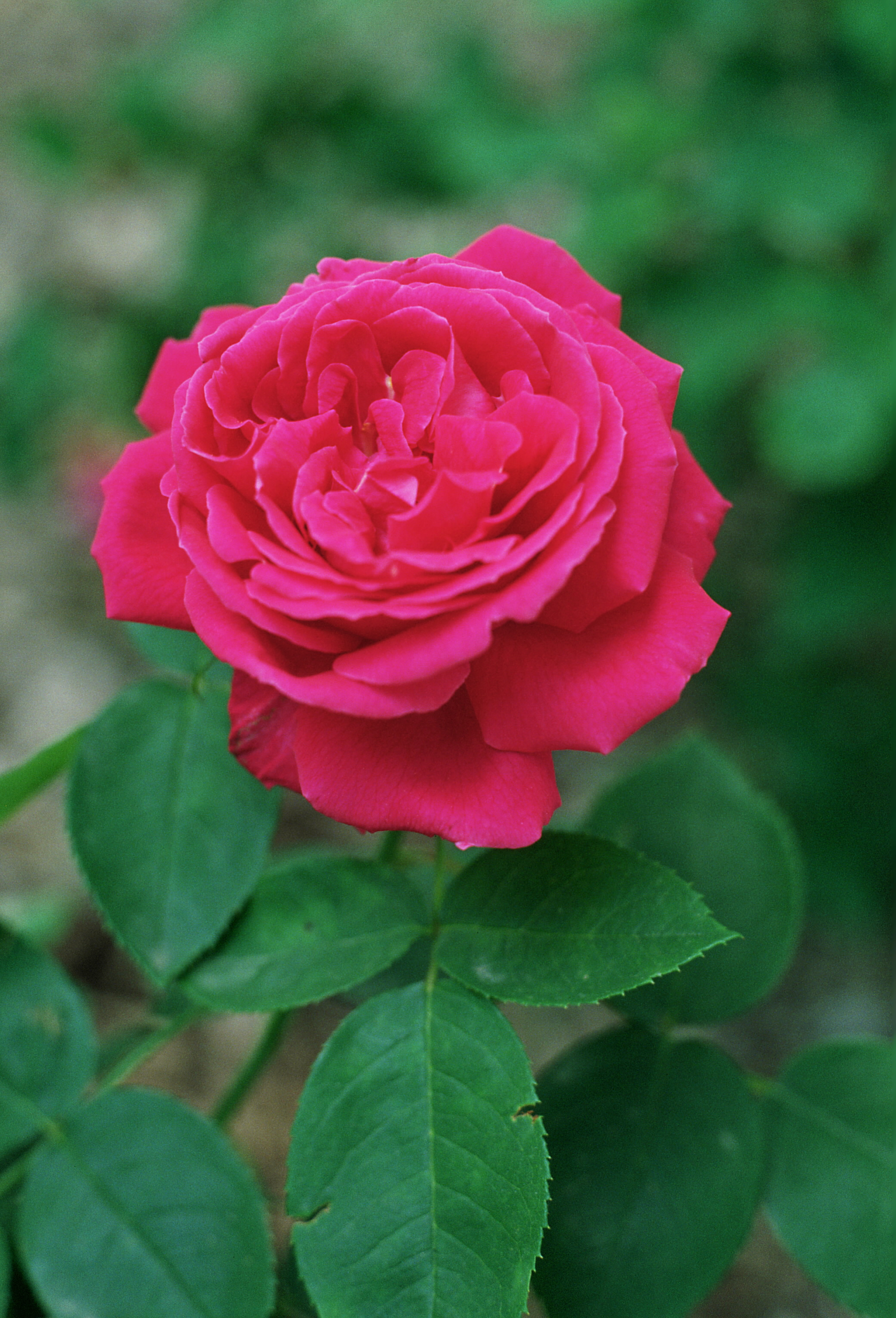
'Tom Wood', Hybrid Perpetual 1896

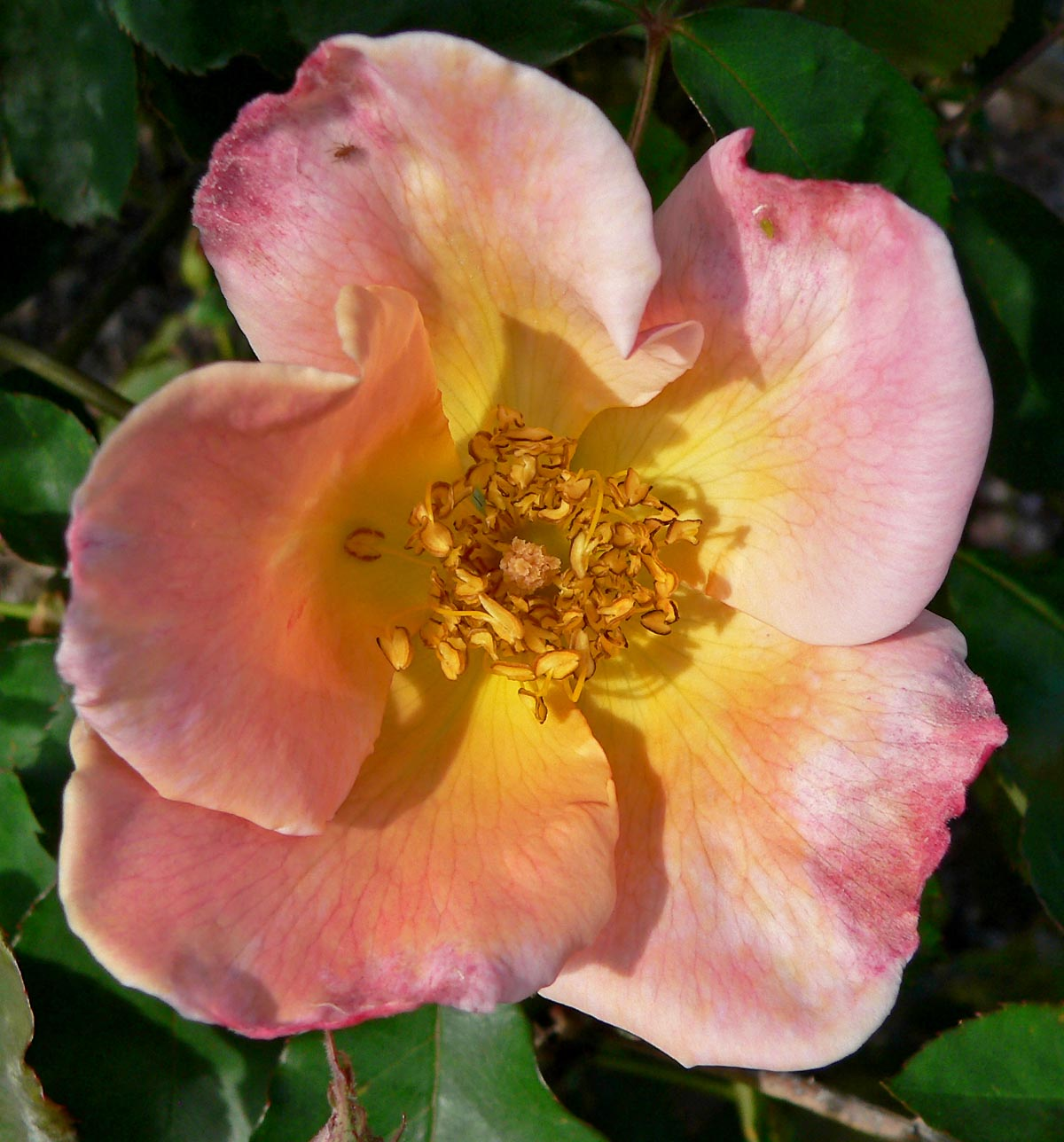
'Irish Elegance', 1905

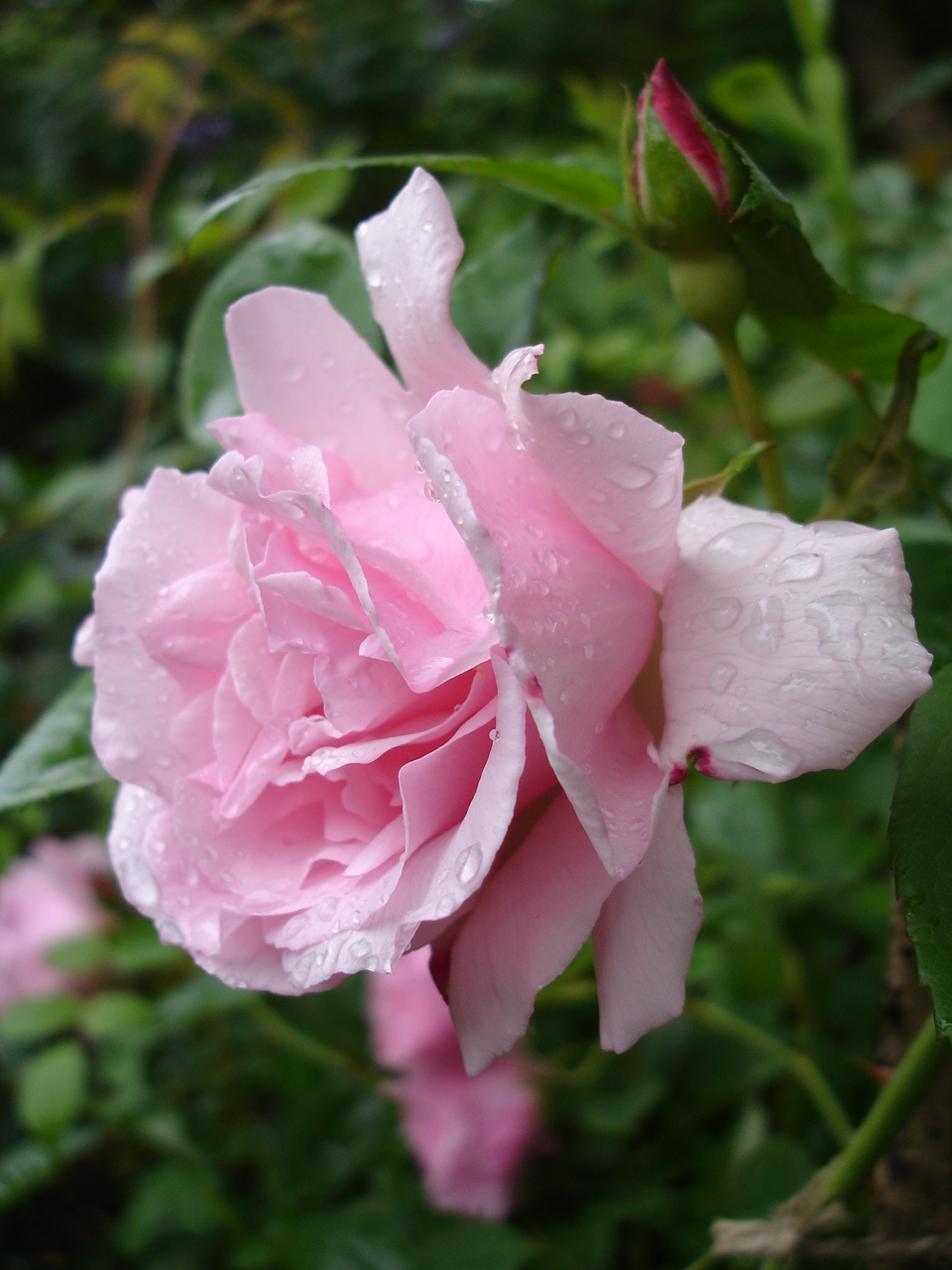
'Kathleen Harrop', 1919

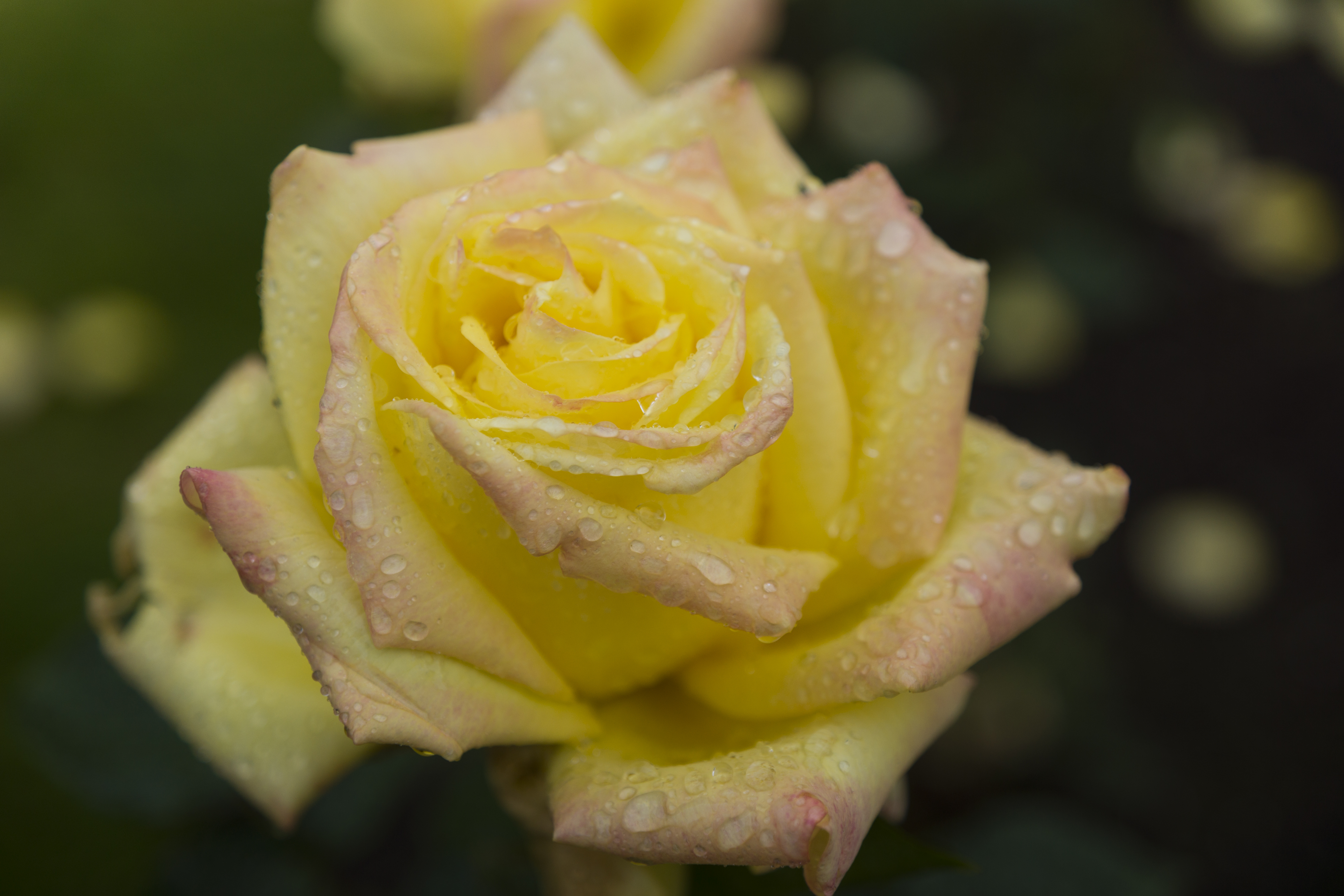
'Grandpa Dickson' 1966

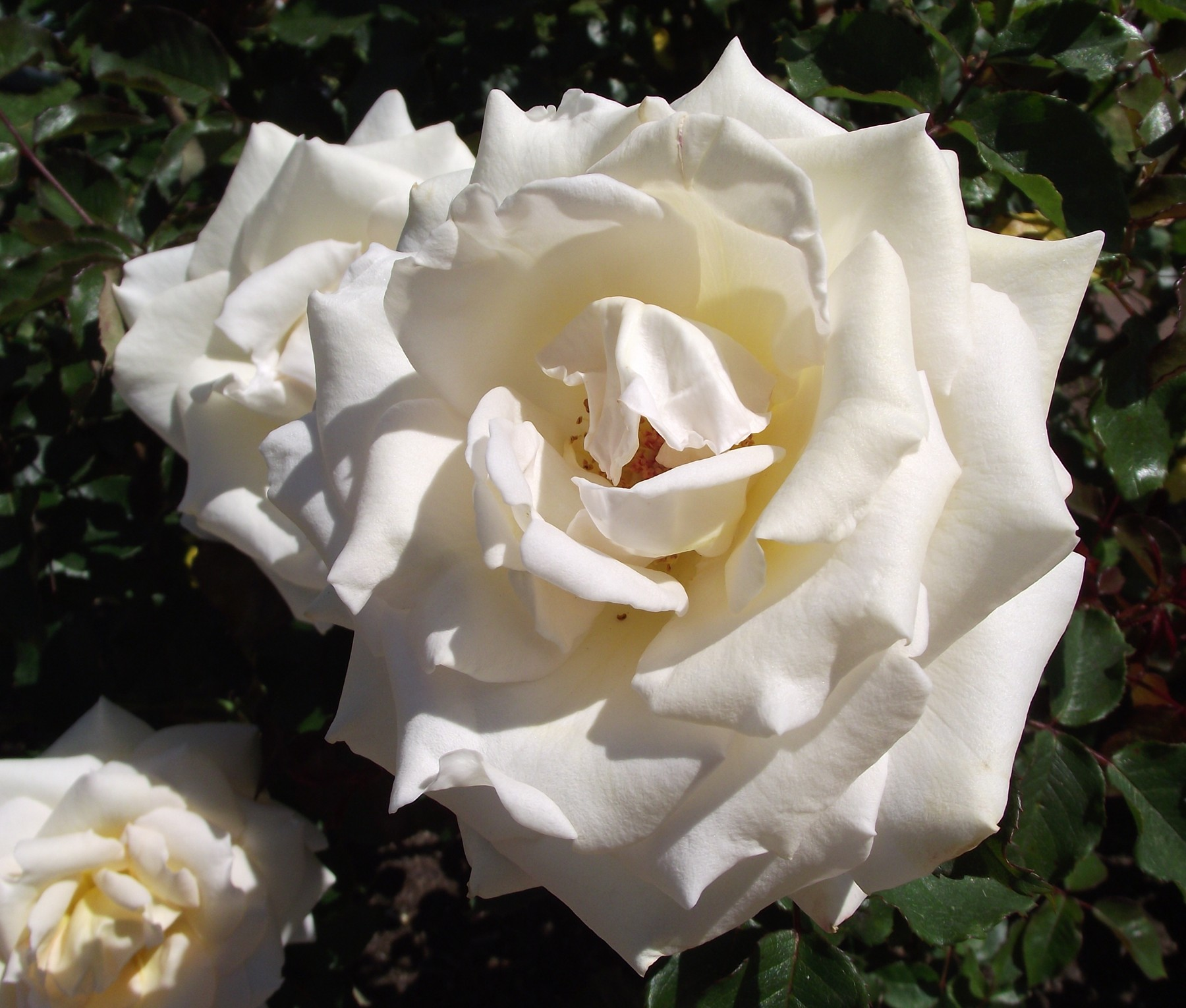
'Whisper', 2002

Dickson Nurseries is a family owned rose nursery, notable for some of the cultivars it developed, and based in Newtownards, County Down, Northern Ireland.

== The firms ==
The nursery was founded by Alexander Dickson I (1801–1880) in 1836. His sons Hugh (c. 1831–1904) and George I (1832–1914) both became interested in roses. The firm became Alexander Dickson and Sons. A separate firm, Royal Nurseries, was founded by Hugh in 1869. With the help of George's sons Alexander II (20 December 1857 – 1949) and George II they started breeding roses in the late 1870s. The main firm later changed its name to Dicksons of Hawlmark and finally became Dickson Nurseries when it moved from Hawlmark to Milecross Road, Newtownards, in 1969.

The BBC reported that the business might close in 2019.

== The breeders ==
Introducing themselves as breeders at the National Rose Society Show in London in 1886, the Dicksons exhibited two Hybrid Perpetuals and a Tea Rose ('Earl of Dufferin', 'Lady Helen Stewart' and 'Ethel Brownlow'). Later came cultivars like George I's famous pink Hybrid Tea 'Mrs. W.J. Grant' (1892) or his cherry red Hybrid Perpetual 'Tom Wood' (1896).

Alexander II worked for the nursery between 1872 and 1930. He became the most prolific of Dickson breeders (242 roses), most notably of the 'Irish' series of single Hybrid Teas issued between 1900 and 1914 (e.g. 'Irish Elegance' in 1905); of 'George Dickson (1912); of 'Kitchener of Khartoum' and 'Kootenay' (1917); of 'Kathleen Harrop' (1919); and of 'Dame Edith Helen'.

Many rose names such as Hugh's 'Ulster Gem' (1917) — and the name Royal Nurseries itself – show that the family regarded itself as part of the United Kingdom, not of a separate Ireland.

Alexander II was followed by his son, Alexander III (1893–15 October 1975), whose 57 named roses include 'Sir Winston Churchill' (1955), 'Red Devil' (1965) and 'Nana Mouskouri' (1975), though his career was inhibited by the Second World War.

From 1957 Alexander Patrick (1926–2012), called Patrick, bred 156 roses for the company, introducing varieties such as 'Sea Pearl' (1964), 'Grandpa Dickson' (1966), 'Redgold' (1967) and 'Elina' (1983).

Since 1977 Colin Dickson (1956– ), rosarian of the sixth generation, has been the main rose breeder. Cultivars created include 'Beautiful Britain' (1983), 'Sweet Magic' (1996), 'Irish Eyes' (2000) and 'Whisper' (2002).

== Awards ==
Many cultivars created by the Dickson family are known worldwide and were granted several rose awards. The following table shows a selection:

GM - Gold Medal; PIT - President's International Trophy (Great Britain)

Name	Form	Colour	Date	Awards	Photo
Elina	Hybrid tea	pale yellow	1984	New Zealand Gold Star of the South Pacific 1987; World's Favourite 2006	
Freedom	Hybrid Tea	yellow	1984	RNRS GM 1983; The Hague Gold Medal 1992	
Kitchener of Khartoum	Hybrid Tea	red	1917	RNRS GM 1916	
Red Devil	Hybrid Tea	red	< 1965	Japanese GM 1967; Belfast GM 1969; Portland GM 1970	
Red Planet	Hybrid Tea	red	1970	PIT & RNRS GM 1969	
Grandpa Dickson	Hybrid Tea	yellow	1966	PIT & RNRS GM 1965; The Hague GM 1966; Belfast GM 1968; Portland GM 1970	
Benita	Floribunda	yellow	1944	Dublin GM 1990; Breeder's Choice 1995	
Whisper	Hybrid Tea	white	2002	All-America Rose Selection 2003	

== See also ==
Roses by Dickson, rose photos sorted by breeder

== Literature ==
- Quest-Ritson, Charles & Brigid (2011). Encyclopedia of roses. New York: Dorling-Kindersley. ISBN 9780756688684.. See especially page 120, "Dickson Roses".
