= Star Roses and Plants/Conard-Pyle =

Horticultural products company in Pennsylvania

Star Roses and Plants/Conard-Pyle, is a horticultural products company, based in West Grove, Pennsylvania since 1855. The company introduced the Peace rose to America from Europe, and always specialized in rose production, but at one time, they were the leading Canna grower and hybridizer in the United States. Star Roses and Plants/Conard-Pyle is best known for introducing the Knock Out Family of Roses and Drift Roses.

== History ==
- 1725s: Ann (1677–1732) and Isaac (1665–1750) Jackson purchased the land for Harmony Grove Farm, where the company would eventually be situated.
- 1770s: John Jackson, grandson of Ann and Isaac Jackson, established a botanic garden on part of the land.
- 1850: Isaac Jackson, grandson of John Jackson, establishes Harmony Grove Nurseries on 30 acres of the original property with stock from nurseryman Thomas M. Harvey, in partnership with Charles Dingee, his sister Elizabeth's husband.
- 1855: Everard Conard (husband of Mary Jackson, sister of Isaac Jackson) formed the firm of Conard & Brother. He later purchased Harmony Grove Nurseries from Isaac Jackson.
- 1862: Conard started a nursery business with Charles Dingee under the name Dingee & Conard. The business had two greenhouses and the establishment was known as the Harmony Grove Nursery.
- 1867: Dingee & Conard began propagating roses under a new system introduced by Antoine Wintzer, the head nurseryman, and a world-class hybridiser. Conard conceived the idea of disposing of their rose stock through the mail. Their first catalog offered bedding plants, shrubbery, bulbs, seeds, and roses.
- 1888: Howard Preston sold his farm (a dairy farm and regional creamery) to S. Morris Jones, who continued to operate the creamery.
- 1892: Conard separated from Dingee and along with Antoine Wintzer joined with S. Morris Jones. The new company continued with the growing and distribution of roses and flowering plants. Much of the farmland acquired by Jones became part of Conard-Pyle, the house was eventually provided to the head nurseryman, Antoine Wintzer, as his residence.
- 1895: Antoine Wintzer worked on the improvement of the canna.
- 1897: The company's name became Conard & Jones Co.
- 1898: Robert Pyle joined the company and purchased control in it after Conard's death on December 15, 1906.
- 1930: After Antoine Wintzer died, he was succeeded by Sydney Hutton, of New Jersey, as head nurseryman.
- 1950: After Robert Pyle died, Sydney Hutton purchased Conard-Pyle. Three generations of Huttons have owned and operated the company ever since, living in the house at West Grove until 1997 when the house was sold to a private individual.
- 2012: The current owner Steven Hutton launched a new house brand, Star® Roses and Plants/Conard-Pyle, with a new focus on royalties licensing and plant breeding.

== Horticulturists ==
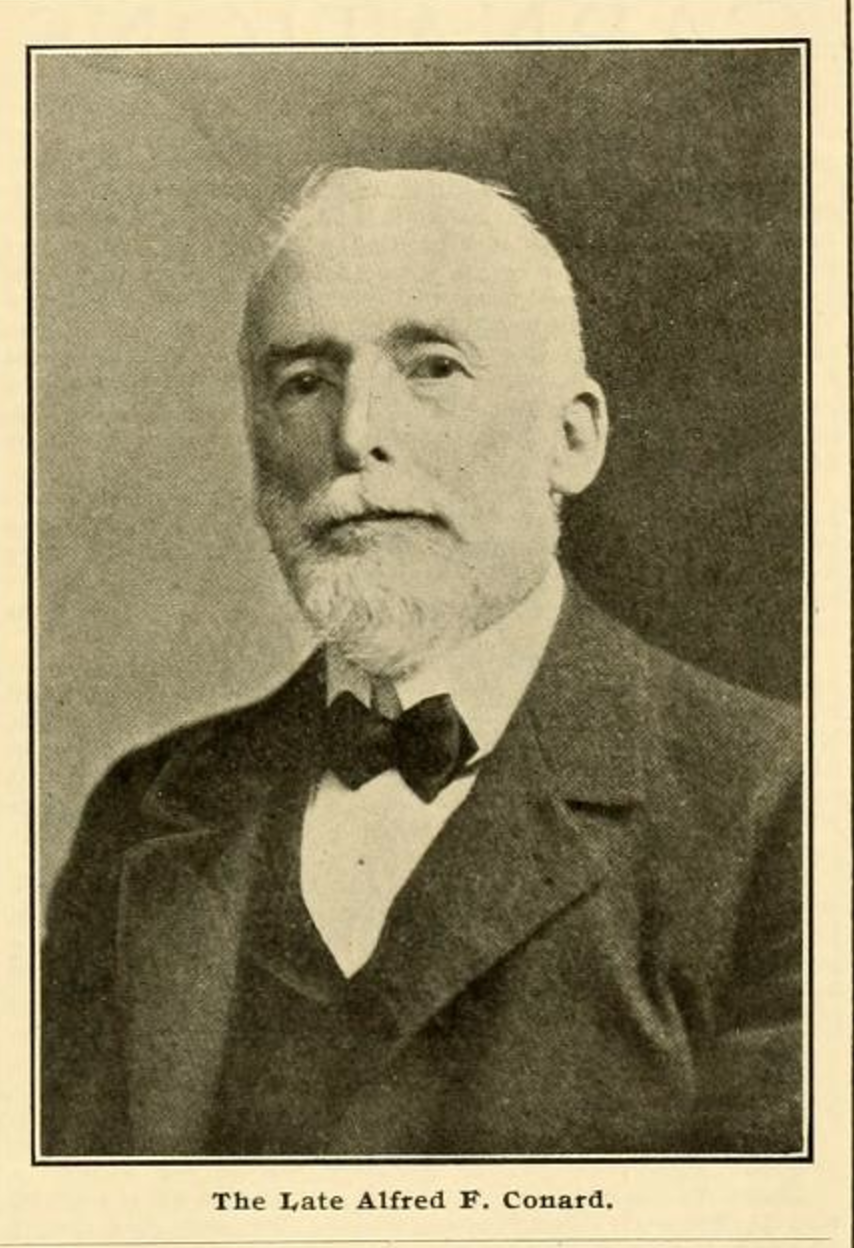
Alfred F. Conard

=== Alfred Fellenberg Conard ===
- Alfred Fellenberg Conard (1835–1906) of West Grove, Pennsylvania, USA was born in Philadelphia, Pennsylvania in 1835. He descended from German Quakers who were part of William Penn’s Colony in 1683. He worked on his father’s farm and learned the nursery business from Thomas M. Harvey.

=== Charles Dingee ===
- Charles Dingee was a member of the Dingee seeds family.

=== Antoine Wintzer ===
- Antoine "Leon" Wintzer was born in Alsace, France, emigrating to the USA at an early age, died at West Grove, PA in 1930. The head-nurseryman before becoming the company's Vice-President.

=== S. Morris Jones ===
- S. Morris Jones, no more information available.

=== Robert Pyle ===
- Robert Pyle rapidly developed the business with the popular sale of two-year-old field-grown rose plants on grafted roots, which brought higher prices and yielded plants that would bloom in the first year of purchase.
- Pyle became an internationally known nurseryman and authority on roses, serving in leadership positions in the American Rose Society, the National Association of Plant Patent Owners, the American Association of Botanical Gardens and Arboretums, the American Horticultural Society, and other organizations.
- One of the most famous roses of all time, the Peace rose, was introduced by Pyle patented in 1943 from the work of the French hybridizer Francis Meilland. The Peace Rose was sent To J. Horace McFarland on the last flight out of France before the Nazis invaded.

=== Steve Hutton ===
- Steve Hutton is the former President/CEO of Star® Roses and Plants/Conard-Pyle.
- Hutton is a third-generation nurseryman.
- Hutton is a past president of All America Rose Selections, president of the National Association of Plant Patent Owners, member of the Pennsylvania Horticultural Society’s Gold Medal Award Committee, member of the board of the Wholesale Nursery Growers of America, and member of the International Plant Propagators' Society.

== Cultivars created ==
=== Cannas ===
The creation of new Canna cultivars appears to have been the passion of Antoine Wintzer, the head nurseryman of the company. He produced many new cultivars, amongst them:
- Canna 'American Flag' 1902
- Canna 'California'
- Canna 'Louisiana'
- Canna 'Shenandoh'
- Canna 'Venus'
- Canna 'West Grove'
- Canna 'Wintzer's Colossal'
- Canna 'Wyoming'

=== Roses ===
- Rosa 'Peace'
- Rosa 'Mister Lincoln'
- Sunblaze®
- Meidiland®
- Carefree®
- Romantica®
- Knock Out®
- Drift®

=== Perennials ===
- Caryopteris Grand Bleu® Bluebeard
- Coreopsis Crème Caramel™ Tickseed
- Echinacea Purple Fantasy™
- Echinacea Panther Pink™
- Eupatorium 'Little Joe'
- Nepeta Junior Walker™
- Salvia 'Bright Eyes'
- Salvia 'Dancing Dolls'
- Salvia 'Fire Dancer'
- Salvia 'Golden Girl'
- Salvia 'Orchid Glow'
- Salvia 'Shell Dancer'
- Veronica 'Tickled Pink'

=== Woody Plants ===
- Arctic Emerald Boxwood
- Buxus 'Franklin's Gem' Boxwood
- Buxus 'Highlander' Boxwood
- Buxus Gordo™
- Buxus Green Ice®
- Chamaecyparis 'Golden Mop'
- Chamaecyparis Night Light™
- Eleagnus Olive Martini™
- Hydrangea 'Annie's Blue'
- Ilex 'Drops of Gold'
- Lonicera Edmee Gold™
- Lonicera Ophelia™
- Microbiota Fuzzball™
- Photinia Pink Marble™
- Prunus 'Chestnut Hill'
- Spiraea Lightning Strike™
- Thuja Fire Chief™
- Weigela French Lace™

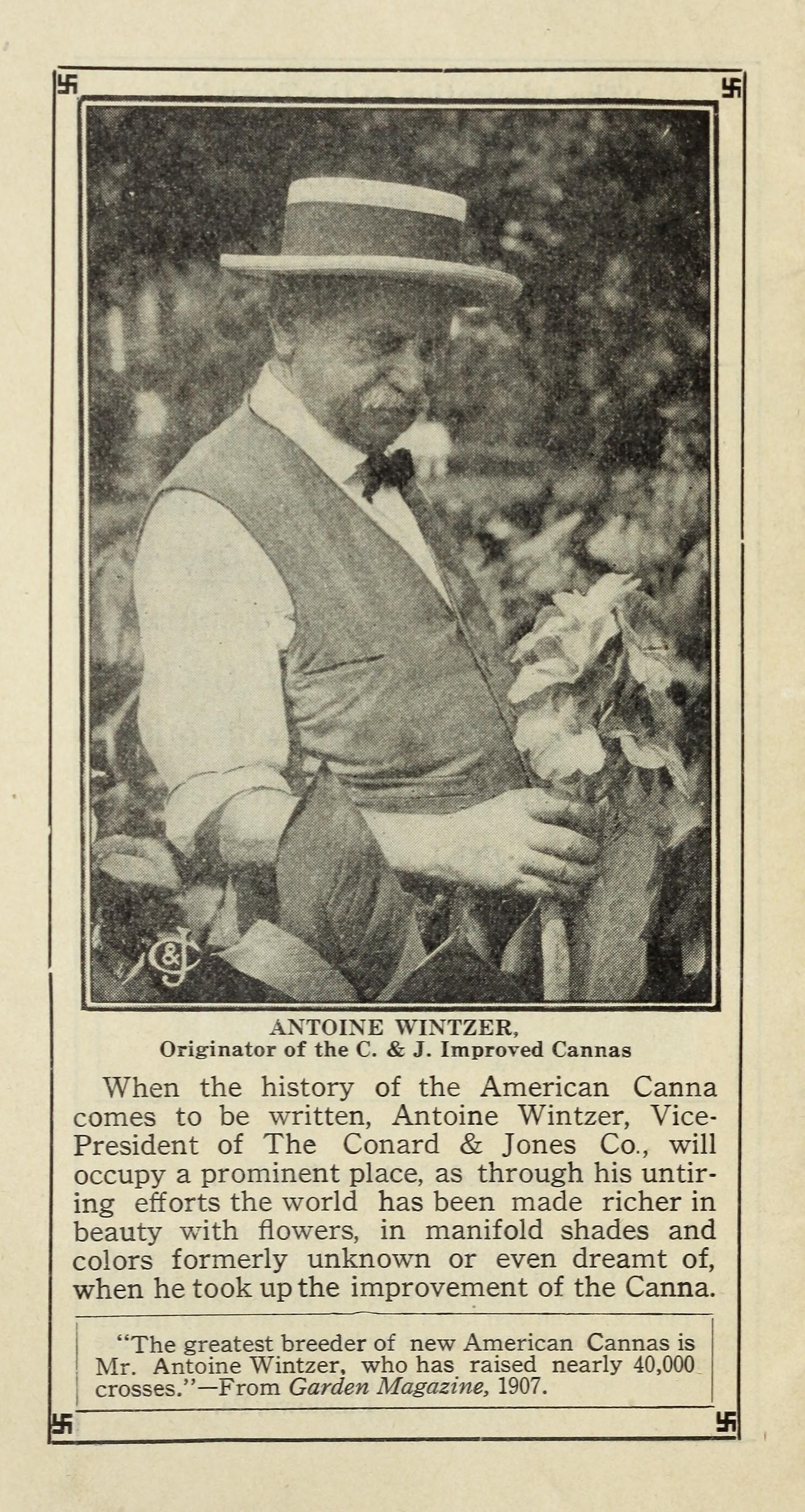
Antoine Wintzer, originator of the C. & J. Improved Cannas.

== Roses bred by Conard & Jones Co. ==
- Belle d'Orléans, Noisette 1902
- Canadian Belle, Tea 1907
- Climbing Mosella, Polyantha 1909
- Eastern Gem, Tea 1905
- Eugene Jardine, Noisette 1898
- Henry Irving, Hybrid Perpetual 1903
- Kaiserin Goldifolia, Hybrid Tea 1909
- Little Gem, Polyantha 1898
- Madame Bessemer, Hybrid Tea 1898
- Palo Alto, Tea 1898
- Peach Blossom, Tea 1898
- Royal Cluster, Hybrid Multiflora 1899
