= William Paul (horticulturalist) =

William Paul (1822–1905) was an English horticulturalist and writer, known for his book The Rose Garden.

== Life ==
Born at Churchgate, Cheshunt, Hertfordshire, on 16 June 1822, he was second son of Adam Paul who came to London from Aberdeenshire towards the close of the 18th century and purchased the Cheshunt nursery in 1806. After education at a private school at Waltham Cross, he joined his father's business. On Adam Paul's death in 1847 the business was carried on as A. Paul & Son by William and his elder brother George. In 1860 this partnership was dissolved. William Paul & Son carried on the Waltham Cross nursery, which he had founded a year before, while George established the firm of Paul & Son at Cheshunt.

Paul served on the committee of the National Floricultural Society from 1851 until it was dissolved in 1858, when the floral committee of the Royal Horticultural Society was established. In July 1858 he joined the National Rose Society, which Samuel Reynolds Hole had just founded, and in 1866 he was one of the executive committee of twenty-one members for the major International Horticultural Exhibition. He also acted as a commissioner for the Paris Exhibition of 1867.

Paul was elected a fellow of the Linnean Society in 1875, and received the Victoria Medal of horticulture when it was first instituted in 1897. In addition to The Rose Annual, which he issued from 1858 to 1881, Paul was associated with his friends Dr. Robert Hogg and Thomas Moore in the editorship of The Florist and Pomologist from 1868 to 1874. The practical knowledge with which he wrote of varied types of plant life impressed Charles Darwin.

== Death and legacy ==
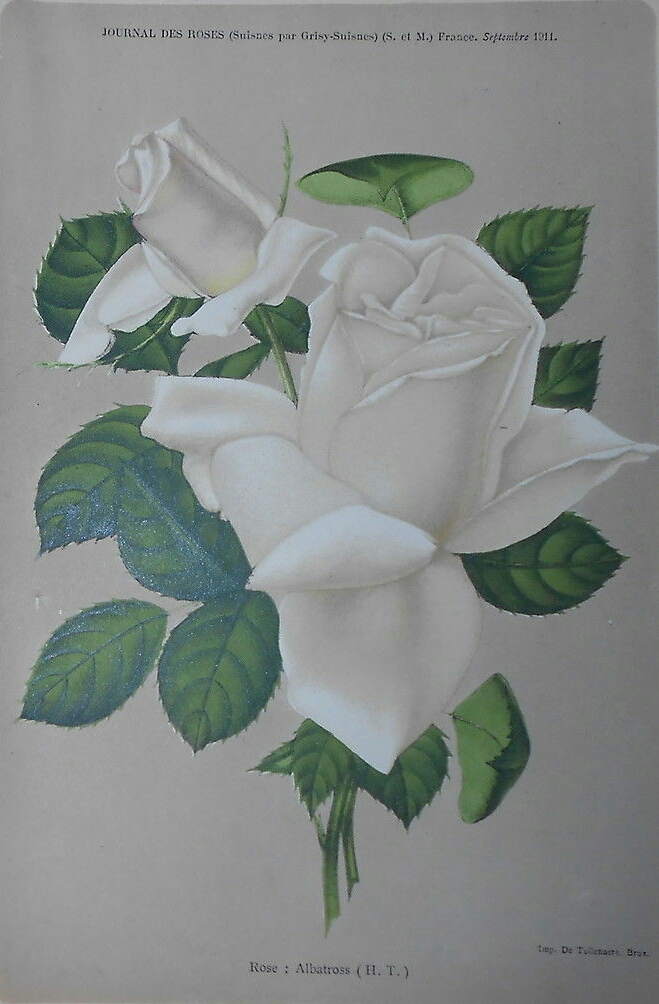
Rose 'Albatross' (William Paul 1908).

Paul died of a paralytic seizure on 31 March 1905, and was buried in the family vault at Cheshunt cemetery. The library of old gardening books and general literature, which he collected at his residence Waltham House, was sold at Sotheby's after his death, but many volumes were bought by his son.

== Works ==
John Claudius Loudon discovered Paul's literary abilities, and for him Paul did early literary work. He then helped John Lindley for whom in 1843, he wrote articles in the Gardeners' Chronicle on "Roses in Pots",' which were issued separately the same year, and reached a ninth edition in 1908. Paul's book, The Rose Garden, which was first published in 1848, reached its tenth edition in 1903, retaining its authority for sixty years. It is a practical treatise, to which Paul gave a literary character.

Although best known as a rosarian, Paul devoted attention to the improvement of other plants, such as hollyhocks, asters, hyacinths, phloxes, camellias, zonal pelargoniums, hollies, ivies, shrubs, fruit-trees, and Brussels sprouts. He dealt with these subjects in American Plants, their History and Culture (1858), the Lecture on the Hyacinth (1864), and papers on An Hour with the Hollyhock (1851) and on Tree Scenery (1870–2). He contributed papers on the varieties of yew and holly to the Proceedings of the Royal Horticultural Society (1861, 1863).

Paul was also author of:

- Villa Gardening, 1865; 3rd revised edit. 1876.
- Roses and Rose-Culture, 1874, brochure; 11th edit. 1910.
- The Future of Epping Forest, 1880.

One of Paul's lectures, Improvements in Plants, at Manchester in 1869, was included in his Contributions to Horticultural Literature, 1843–1892 (1892).

== Family ==
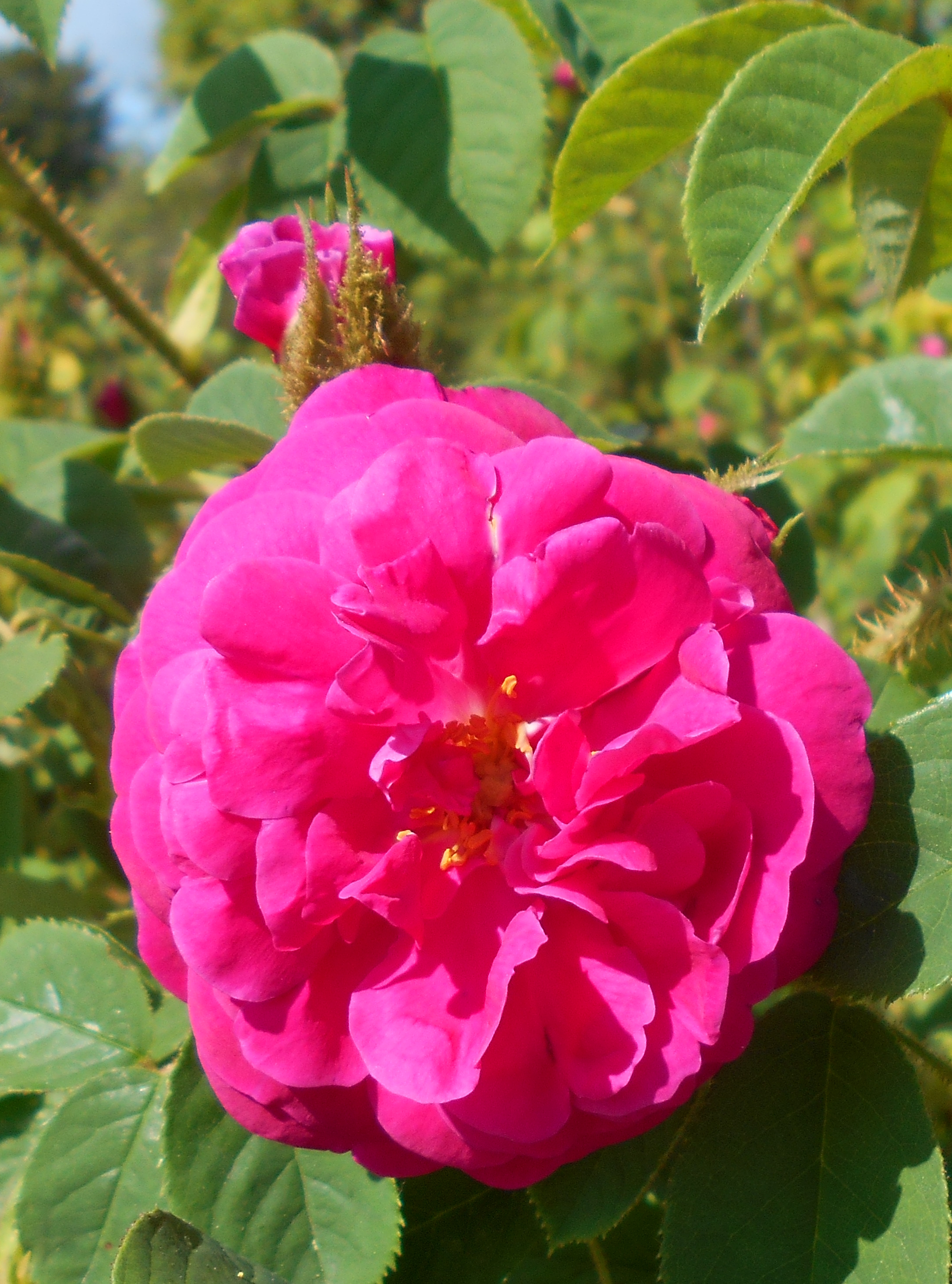
Rosa "Madame William Paul"

Paul's wife, Amelia Jane Harding, predeceased him. His business was carried on by his son, Arthur William Paul.

== Legacy ==
- Although Paul's Nursery no longer exists, the name lives on in Paul's Nursery Road in Epping Forest, where the nursery once was.
- Paul's is known today for varieties such as 'Paul's Lemon Pillar' and 'Paul's Scarlet Climber (a rose which was cultivated by William Paul -the son- in 1915).
