= Rosa 'Joanna Hill' =

Yellow hybrid tea rose cultivar

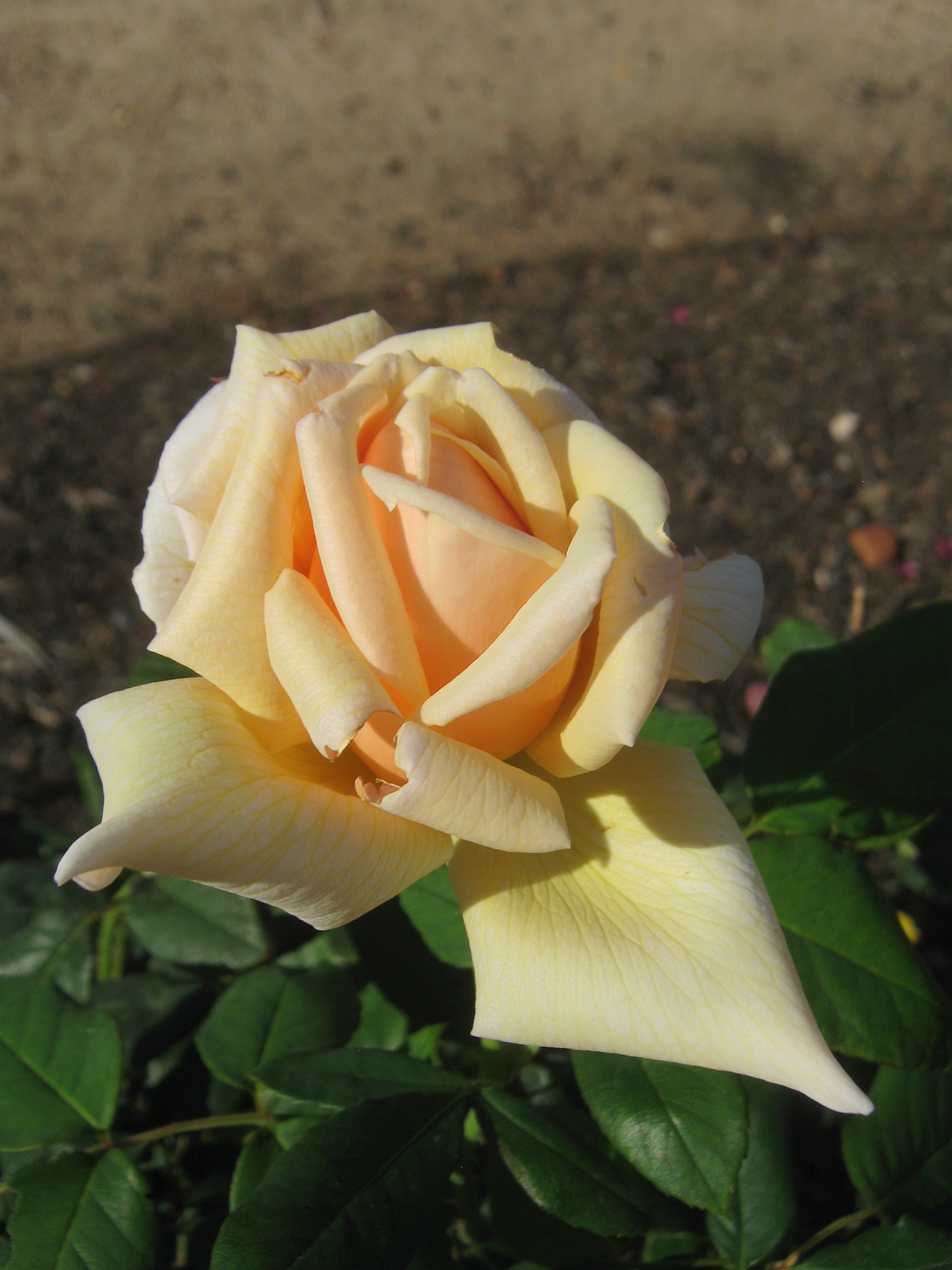
- Rosa 'Joanna Hill'
- Genus: Rosa hybrid
- Hybrid parentage: 'Madame Butterfly' x 'Amelia Gude'
- Cultivar group: Hybrid tea
- Breeder: Joseph H. Hill Co.
- Origin: United States, 1928

Rosa 'Joanna Hill' is a yellow hybrid tea rose, bred by American rose breeder, Joseph H. Hill in 1928. 'Joanna Hill is one of the ancestors of the legendary hybrid tea rose, 'Peace'.

== Description ==
'Joanna Hill' is a medium, upright hybrid tea rose with large, full, high-centered petals, born mostly solitary or in small clusters. It ranges in height from 3 to 4 ft (0.91–1.22 m), with a 2 ft (0.61 m) spread. Long pointed buds open to flowers that are a medium or creamy yellow color with a dark yellow center. The rose varies in fragrance from mild to strong. It is nearly thornless and has leathery, medium green foliage. The plant blooms continuously throughout the season.

== History ==
=== Hill family nurseries ===
Edward Gurney Hill and his father, Joseph, established the family nursery business, Hill and Company, in Richmond, Indiana in 1881. By the 1890s, The Hill Company had moved its greenhouses to a larger location and incorporated as the E.G. Hill Co. Hill began introducing European roses, and later began a rose hybridization program with his son Joseph Herbert. While visiting nurseryman William Paul in Waltham Cross, England in 1912, E.G. discovered an interesting seedling in Paul's rose fields. That seedling was later introduced by Paul as 'Ophelia' and became an important part of the Hill family's rose breeding program. In the nursery's rose fields, 'Ophelia' produced a sport, which the company introduced in 1918 as 'Madame Butterfly' and used the award-winning rose in their breeding program, producing a number of best selling roses, including 'Columbia' and 'Joanna Hill.

=== 'Joanna Hill' ===
The rose cultivar was bred by Joseph H. Hill by crossing pink hybrid tea, 'Madame Butterfly' with 'Amelia Gude'. The rose cultivar was introduced in the United States in 1928 and in Australia in 1930. 'Joanna Hill is one of three parents of the legendary hybrid tea rose, 'Peace'. Besides the Peace rose, 'Joanna Hill' was used to hybridize 7 child plants, including 'Eclipse' (1935), 'Fritz Nobis' (1940), 'Joanna Hill Cl.' (sport, 1935), 'Michelle Meilland' (1945), 'Shepherd's Delight' (1956), 'Show Girl' (1945) and 'Swantje' (1936).

== Sources ==
- Phillips, Roger; Rix, Martyn (1993). The Quest for the Rose. New York: Random House. ISBN 978-0-679-43573-0.
- Quest-Ritson, Brigid; Quest-Ritson, Charles (1993). Encyclopedia of Roses. DK Publishing. ISBN 978-0756688684.
