= Rosa 'Margaret McGredy' =

Orange-red hybrid tea rose cultivar

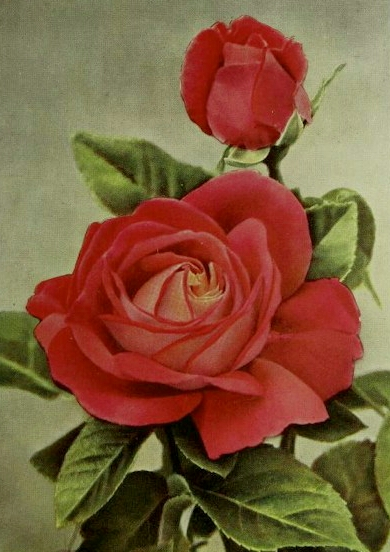
- Rosa 'Margaret McGredy'
- Genus: Rosa hybrid
- Hybrid parentage: seedling of Rosa 'Queen Alexandra' (McGredy, 1918)
- Cultivar group: Hybrid tea
- Breeder: Samuel McGredy III
- Origin: Ireland, before 1925

Rosa 'Margaret McGredy' is an orange-red hybrid tea rose, bred by Irish rose breeder Sam McGredy III before 1925. The new rose was awarded the Royal National Rose Society (RNRS) Gold Medal in 1925, but was never commercially successful. 'Margaret McGredy, along with an unnamed seedling, was used to hybridize the legendary hybrid tea rose, 'Peace'.

== Description ==
'Margaret McGredy' is a vigorous, upright hybrid tea rose with large, full, high-centered petals, born mostly solitary or in small clusters. Long buds open to orange-scarlet flowers with shades of yellow and a pink reverse. Flower colours fade quickly after blooming. The rose has a mild fragrance and has leathery, thick leaves that are dark olive green in colour. The plant blooms continuously throughout the season.

== History ==
=== McGredy roses ===
The Sam McGredy family represents four generations of rose hybridizers from Northern Ireland. The first Samuel McGredy (1828 –1903), established the family nursery in Portadown, County Armagh. Originally, the head gardener at a large estate, in 1888, McGredy moved his family to Portadown, leased 10 acres with a greenhouse and established a nursery with his son, Samuel II (1861–1926). The nursery sold a variety of plants, but they were best known for their fruit trees and show pansies.

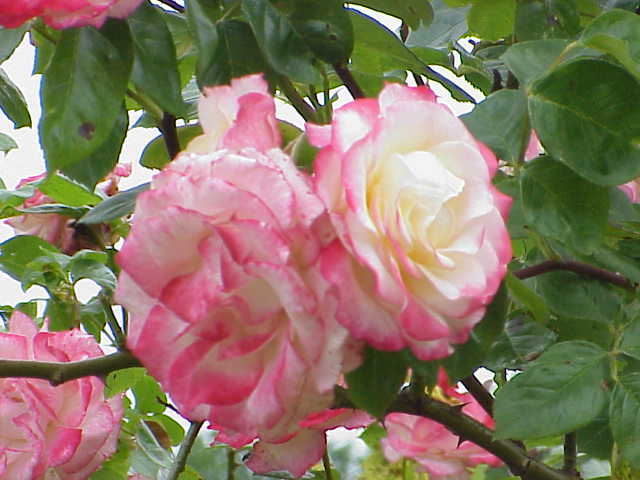
'Handel' 1960

Samuel McGredy II began breeding roses in 1895. He submitted his first roses at the National Rose Society in London in 1905, where he won his first gold medal, the salmon-pink, "Countess of Gosford" rose. He produced many award-winning roses during his career as a rose breeder. McGredy was awarded the National Rose Society's Dean Hole Medal in 1921. The business passed to his son, Samuel McGredy III (1897–1934), after Samuel II's death in 1926. Samuel III (Sam) expanded rose production at the company. He named many roses after family members. The nursery's rose breeding program declined after McGredy's early death of a heart attack at the age of 38 and the beginning of World War II. His son, Samuel IV was two years old at the time of his father's death.

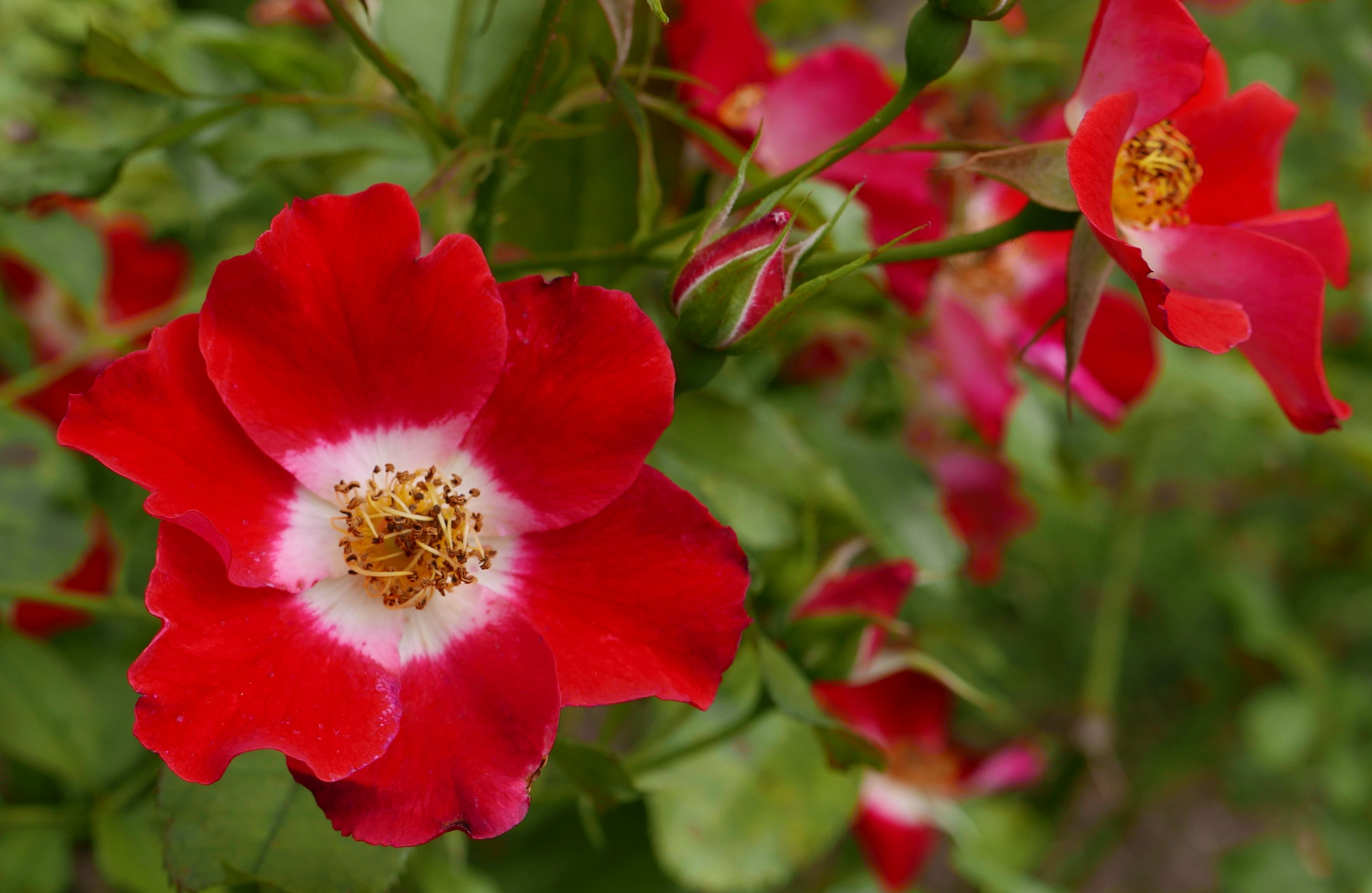
Rosa 'Eye Paint', 1976

When Samuel McGredy IV (Sam) (1931–2019) took over the family business in 1952, he knew very little about rose breeding. He sought out the renowned rose hybridizers at the time: Reimer Kordes from Germany, Eugene Boerner from the United States and Niels Poulsen from Denmark, in order to educate himself on modern rose hybridization. Soon after, he created a new rose breeding program at the nursery. McGredy's first commercial success was his Gold Medal winner, floribunda rose, 'Orangeade' in 1959. During the 1960s, McGredy was best known for his hybrid tea and floribunda roses.

In 1972, alarmed over the increasing political violence in Northern Ireland, McGredy and his family moved to Auckland, New Zealand. He transplanted his nursery stock and renamed the company, McGredy Roses International. New Zealand's climate, ideal for plant cultivation, allowed McGredy to breed roses outdoors without greenhouses. He soon introduced a new series of what he called 'hand painted' roses, brightly coloured striped roses and roses splashed with two or more colours. Some of his most popular rose cultivars include Rosa 'Dublin Bay, Rosa 'Sexy Rexy', Rosa 'Olympiad' and Rosa 'Handel'. When McGredy retired in 2007, he closed the nursery. He died in 2019.

=== 'Margaret McGredy' ===
'Margaret McGredy' was bred by Sam McGredy III before 1925 from a seedling of hybrid tea rose, 'Queen Alexandra' (McGredy, 1918). McGredy named his new rose cultivar after his mother, Margaret. The rose was introduced in France in 1927 and Australia in 1928, as 'Margaret McGredy'. Although the rose was awarded the Royal National Rose Society (RNRS) Gold Medal on 17 September, 1925, the rose was never commercially successful or popular with the public. 'Margaret McGredy, along with an unnamed seedling descended from the roses: 'George Dickson' (1912), 'Souvenir de Claudius Pernet' (1920), 'Johanna Hill' (1928) and 'Charles P. Kilham (1926), was used to hybridize the legendary hybrid tea rose, 'Peace'.

== Sources ==
- Harkness, Jack (1985). The Maker of Heavenly Roses. ISBS. ISBN 978-0285626546.
- McFarland, John (1958). Modern Roses Volume V. J. McFarland Co. p. 220.
- Quest-Ritson, Brigid; Quest-Ritson, Charles (1993). Encyclopedia of Roses. DK Publishing. ISBN 978-0756688684.
