= Rosa 'Korschwill' =

Floribunda rose cultivar

KORschwill
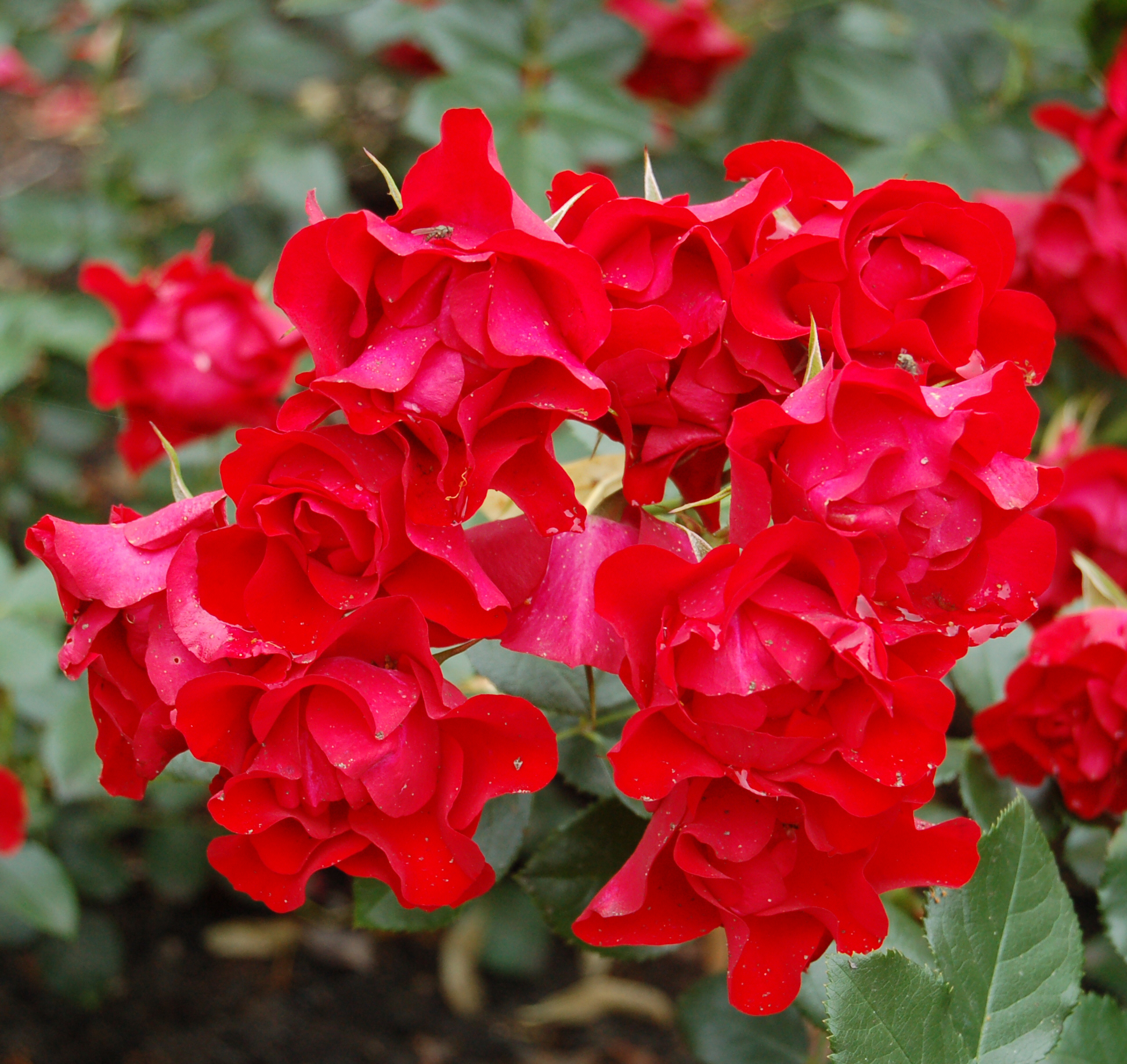
- Hybrid parentage: seedling × seedling
- Cultivar group: Floribunda rose
- Cultivar: 'KORschwill'
- Marketing names: 'Black Forest', 'Göte Haglund', 'Schloss Trauttmansdorff', 'Trauttmansdorff Castle'
- Origin: W. Kordes Söhne, Germany

Rosa 'Korschwill' (also written KORschwill and KORSCHWILL) is a rose cultivar (variety) of medium height used for landscaping, introduced in 2010. In addition to the cultivar name Rosa ‘Korschwill’ and the registration name (code name) KORschwill, the cultivar has the registered commercial synonyms Black Forest, Göte Haglund, Schloss Trauttmansdorff and Trauttmansdorff Castle, and the American Exhibition Name (AEN) Black Forest Rose.

== Origin ==
KORschwill was bred by Tim‑Herman Kordes of W. Kordes’ Söhne, Germany. The registered parentage is seedling × seedling, which means the ancestry of the not well known.

== Description ==
KORschwill is a floribunda rose (American Rose Society horticulture class). The medium‑sized flower is medium red, with double petals, petal count 17–25, and no (or slight) fragrance. The bloom habit of the flowers is small clusters and the foliage is glossy dark green. KORschwill is very disease‑resistant.

== Awards ==
In 2019 KORschwill was awarded a gold medal and the Marion de Boehme Award (Best Rose of the Trial and Australian Rose of the Year) by the National Rose Society of Australia at the National Rose Trial Garden of Australia. It has been awarded The Rose Hill Perpetual Challenge Bowl for the "Best Floribunda of the Trial" in the United States. It was selected as an ADR rose in 2011 (recognized at the Allgemeine Deutsche Rosenneuheitenprüfung trials for pesticide‑free health combined with aesthetic qualities and hardiness.
