= Rosa 'Pink Flamingo' =

Pink Grandiflora rose cultivar

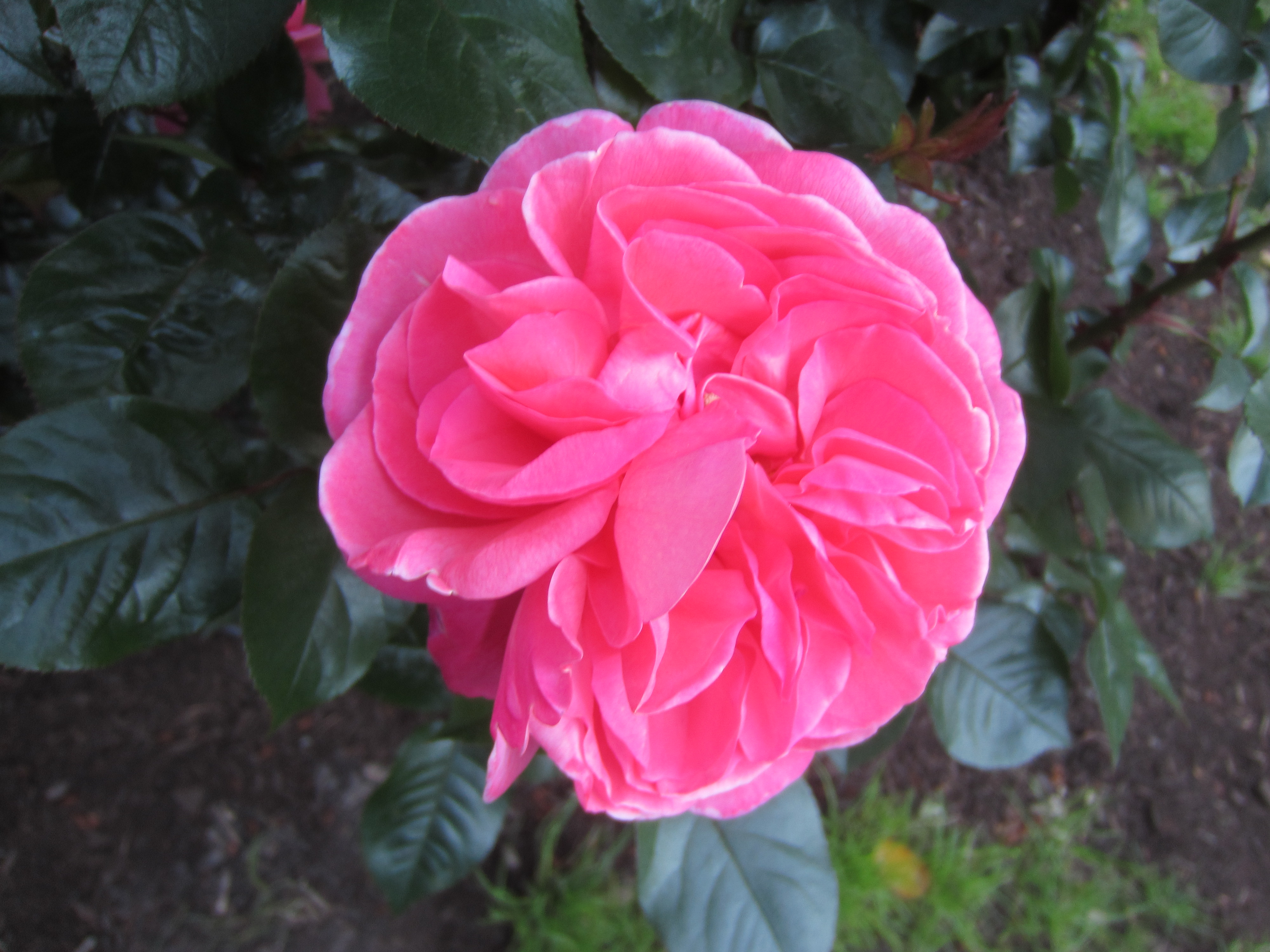
- Rosa 'Pink Flamingo'
- Genus: Rosa hybrid
- Cultivar group: Grandiflora, hybrid tea
- Cultivar: 'MEIkolyma'
- Marketing names: 'Pink Flamingo', 'Candy Love'®
- Breeder: Alain Meilland
- Origin: France, before 2006

Rosa 'Pink Flamingo' (aka MEIkolyma) is a deep pink Grandiflora rose cultivar, bred by Alain Meilland before 2006. Meilland International introduced the rose in France after 1997 as 'Candy Love'®. It was introduced in the U.S. by Meilland–Star Roses Inc. as 'Pink Flamingo' in 2010. In 2014, the rose was awarded Best Grandiflora Rose at the Portland Rose Trials, in Portland, Oregon.

== Description ==
'Pink Flamingo' is a medium-tall, upright rose, 4 to 5 ft (1.2–1.5 m) in height, with a 2 to 3 ft (0.61–0.91 m) spread. Its flowers are large, 4 to 5 in (100–130 mm) in diameter, with a very full (40+ petals) cupped, globular bloom form. Flower color is a blend of deep pink with hints of salmon. The rose has a moderate fragrance and foliage is glossy and dark green. 'Pink Flamingo' is more winter hardy and disease resistant than most Grandiflora roses.

== History ==
=== 'Pink Flamingo' ===
'Pink Flamingo' was developed by Alain Meilland before 2006 by crossing the hybrid teas, ('Christopher Columbus' x 'Yakimor') x ('Shannon'). Meilland International introduced the rose in France after 1997 as 'Candy Love'. It was introduced in the U.S. by Meilland–Star Roses Inc. as 'Pink Flamingo' in 2010. In 2014, 'Pink Flamingo' was awarded Best Grandiflora Rose at the Portland Rose Trials, in Portland, Oregon.
