= Rose registration name =

Unique names that distinguish rose varieties from each other

A rose registration name is a unique name that distinguishes a rose variety (cultivar) from every other rose variety. All rose registration names are registered by the American Rose Society.

A registration name is either a buyer‑friendly name consisting of one or more words from natural language, or a code name, where the first three letters signify the breeder, and the other letters are more or less meaningless, e.g. the rose KORschwill bred by Kordes. The defined term is "registration name"; rose is added for clarity.

== Properties and regulation of rose registration names ==
A rose registration name can be a commercially viable "fancy" name such as "Silver Anniversary" or "Birthday Girl", or a seemingly nonsensical code name such as "Ausjive" (which can be written AUSjive). Many older varieties and some new ones have one or more words or proper nouns from everyday language such as "Peace" as registration names. Code names were introduced in 1970s and 1980s.

If a variety has a well known name as well as a code name, the code name is often the official registration name. But in some cases, for example Betty Boop, the buyer‑friendly name Betty Boop is the registration name, and the code name is a registered synonym.

Naming of rose cultivars is guided by the International Code of Nomenclature for Cultivated Plants. The code stipulates, amongst other things, that registration names must

- be different from other names of varieties
- not be a translation of the name of any other rose variety or plant
- not contain technical terms such as "hybrid" or "mutant"
- not be longer than 10 syllables or 30 characters
- be possible to pronounce. Code names such as RADrazz or WEKcisbako are nonsensical but pronounceable.

Since 1955, the American Rose Society (ARS) is the International Cultivar Registration Authority for Roses (ICRAR or IRAR), appointed by the International Horticulture Congress of the International Society for Horticultural Science. Rose registration names can only be registered through application to the American Rose Society.

== Code name ==
The most important rose cultivars bred by major breeders have code names as registration names. A code name or ICRAR code is a unique code, consisting of letters of the 26‑letter Roman alphabet, given to a new registered rose variety, to distinguish it from other varieties (cultivars) of roses.

Rose registration names that do not have the structure of three‑letter breeder code plus additional letters are also allowed, but are not called “codes”. Hence some of the existing code names constitute a subset of the registration names of roses, but not all code names are registration names.

=== History and use of code names ===
In 1978, the Convention of the International Union for the Protection of New Plant Varieties in Geneva, Switzerland voted that each new rose variety registered be given a unique descriptor, the code name.

The reason is that every rose plant sold to the public should be identifiable, whatever the commercial names given the rose for sale to the public in different countries and by different retailers. The code name also protects the breeders’ rights to the cultivar. The code name makes it easy to identify the breeder. The code name is often written on the labels or tags of roses sold by retailers, or in catalogues, below a more buyer‑friendly commercial name. All rose code names are registered with the American Rose Society, as the rose registration name of the cultivar, or as one of the synonyms.

There are a few variations of the designation for rose code names, such as “(rose) breeder code”. The different usages have in common that they include the word “code”.

=== Structure of code names ===
Code names are typically a combination of the first three letters of the breeder's name or company followed by additional letters that make each code name unique. The three‑letter breder code is usually in upper‑case letters. However, the International Code for the Nomenclature for Cultivated Plants (9th edition) does not stipulate that the breeder code should be in upper‑case letters. Examples include MEIclusif, a variety created by Meilland International SA, or BEAdonald, bred by Amanda Beales, working for Peter Beales Roses. BEAdonald is marketed under these names:

- In the United States: Flamenco (BEAdonald)
- In the United Kingdom: Ivor’s Rose (BEAdonald)

Breeder codes consisting of four or five letters exist,) but the current application process only allows three‑letter breeder codes. Sometimes a code name is written with all letters upper‑case (MEICLUSIF) or the first letter upper‑case (Meiclusif). All breeders, also amateurs, are required to request a three‑letter breeder code from the American Rose Society before their varieties can be registered under a code name of this type with a leading breeder code.

== Overview of terminology ==
The four terms defined by the American Rose Society are:

1. registration name: the main registered name, which may or may not be a code name
2. code name: a word with a leading three‑letter breeder code
3. synonym: any registered name that is not the registration name; in some cases a code name
4. American Exhibition Name (AEN): one of the buyer‑friendly names (either the registration names or a synonym, if the registration name is a code name); in rare cases (for example KORschwill) the AEN is not exactly identical to one of the other names
