= Rosa 'Meiclusif' =

Hybrid tea rose cultivar

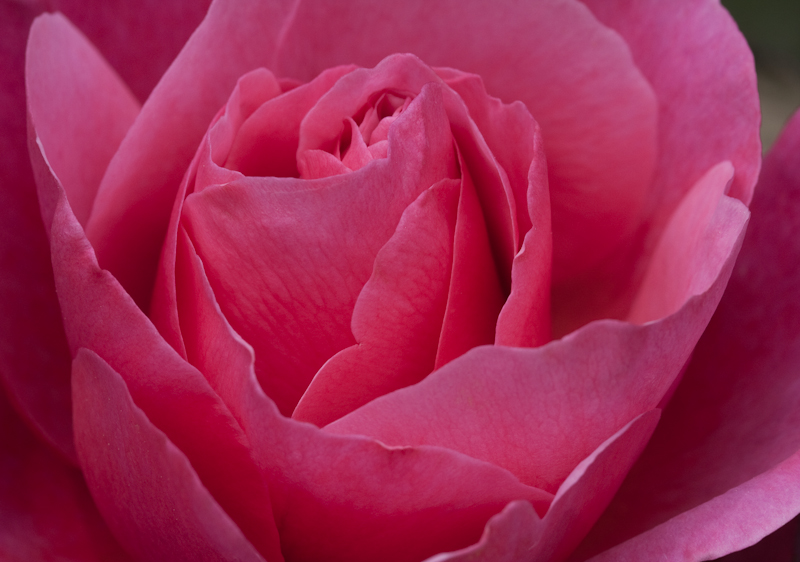
- Close-up of flower
- Hybrid parentage: Rosa hybrid 'Aachener Dom' × ('Louis de Funès' × 'Graham Thomas')
- Cultivar group: Hybrid tea rose
- Cultivar: 'Meiclusif'
- Marketing names: Dee-Lish, Elbflorenz, Forget-Me-Not, Line Renaud, Sweet Parfum de Provence, Tchekhov
- Origin: Meilland, France

Rosa 'Meiclusif', often written Rosa 'MEIclusif' (see Rose code name), sold under the marketing names Line Renaud, Dee‑lish and at least five other names, is a hybrid tea rose cultivar bred in France by Meilland International SA and introduced in 2006. It was given the commercial name Line Renaud (formally a synonym to the rose registration name Meiclusif) after the French actress. Meiclusif is both the official Rose registration name and the rose code name (breeder code). The American Exhibition Name (AEN) is Dee‑Lish.

Meiclusif was developed at the Meilland-Richardier research center in Le Cannet-des-Maures. It is the result of a crossing in the year 1997, germinated in 1998 and was successively selected from thousands of seedlings in several stages. Its combination of fragrance and health was described as rare by Andreas Barlage. Klaus Körber described the citrus fragrance as superb and popular with customers.

The cultivar grows shoots up to 120 centimetres (47 in) high with medium-sized very double flowers that are pink to pink red and have a very strong fragrance. The rose flowers repeatedly beginning in May or June in the northern hemisphere. The rose grows one to four flowers per stem that are 9 to 10 centimetres (3.5 to 3.9 in) in diameter. The bloom has been described as pink, dark pink, or fuchsia-colored in the style of old roses or resembling a peony. The petals are firm, which allows the flower to stay in shape in rain, the inner petals are sometimes whirled or quartered, and petals often have a thin light border and are sometimes crenated. The shrub is very thorny, branches only below flowers, and has large green to dark green foliage. Its habit is upright and bushy.

Meiclusif does not develop hips and does not self-clean in cold or damp weather. Bauer and Grothe suggest planting the rose in small groups and near to seats because of its fragrance. Barlage suggests a combination with garden heliotrope, sweet alyssum, and trumpet lilies. Bauer and Grothe propose combining the rose with rose mallow. Cut flowers of Meiclusif last for a week. The cultivar can grow excessive shoots and gives a middling appearance in a container.

Meiclusif won the Golden Rose of the City Hradec Králové in 2007, became an ADR rose in 2007, won a Silver Medal and Most Fragrant Rose at the 2008 Australian National Rose Trials, and won the 2009 Grand Prix de la Rose in all categories by the National Horticultural Society of France.
