= Rose show =

Horticultural exhibition focused on roses

A rose show is a horticultural exhibition focusing exclusively on roses.

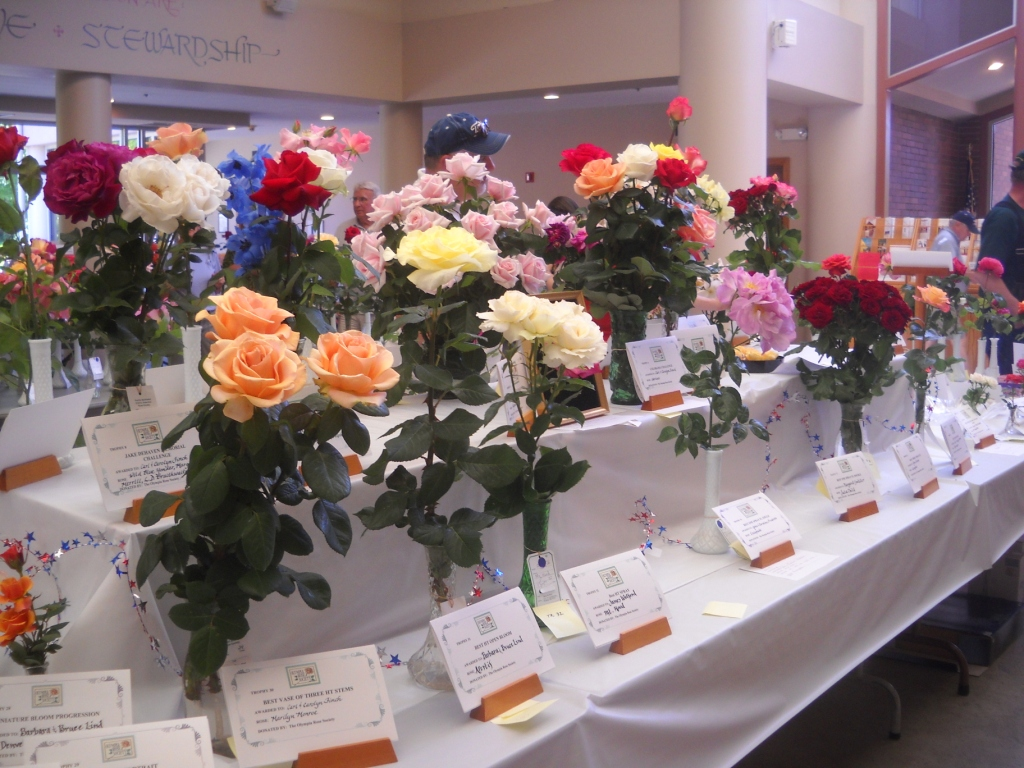
The trophy winners at a local rose show (ARS affiliated rose society)

== History ==
=== United Kingdom ===
Initially in the UK roses were exhibited in general flower shows such as those run by the Royal Horticultural Society. Judges were appointed by whoever sponsored the show, and were not necessarily rosarians themselves. The first Grand National specialty rose show was held July 1, 1858, in St. James Hall, London. It was organized by S. Reynolds Hole, Dean of Rochester Cathedral and a prominent rosarian, Thomas Rivers, a nurseryman and publisher of the first catalog of roses (1834) in the UK, Charles Turner, a rosarian, and William Paul, a writer and nurseryman. Exhibitors were divided into three classes: nurserymen, amateur rosarians with hired gardeners, and amateur rosarians without hired gardeners (avid exhibitors included many working-class men and farmers). Prizes were 36 silver cups engraved with roses. John Edwards was in charge of setting up the show, which entailed clearing away the chairs and benches from the previous night's concert, and constructing tables for the exhibits. Subscription fee for exhibitors was 5 pounds, admission for the general public was 1 shilling. More than 2000 people attended the first Grand National Rose-Show. Music was provided by a brass band, which proved to be too loud for the venue.

Exhibition-form roses were exhibited as cut specimens grouped in a box, and the entire collection was judged on the quality of the individual specimens and on the composition of the whole. Duplicate cultivars were not allowed. Collections were to be in multiples of 6, up to 72 for nurserymen. Most exhibitors put their rose stems in vases or bottles nestled in moss inside a box of some kind, but some exhibitors inserted their cut stems into potatoes in straw to keep the roses hydrated. Wiring of stems and flowers was allowed – Tea roses were popular at that time, and the flowers of many Tea roses do not stand upright on their own. Garden roses, those not possessing exhibition form, were exhibited in bouquets. Judges worked in teams of three.

The second Grand National Rose-Show was held June 23, 1859, in the Hanover Square Rooms. In addition to cut roses in boxes, bouquets, and baskets, potted roses were exhibited. Boxes for the cut rose collections were required to be standardized, with metal vases embedded in moss – no potatoes or straw or beer bottles. The boxes were required to have a cover for transporting the roses to the show. Exhibitors travelled by either train or horse-drawn vans at the time, and roses needed a sturdy box in transportation. Box with cover was only 14" tall, so the specimens inside the box had to be shorter than that. Music was provided by a strings and reeds band instead of brass. After this second show, it was decided that London did not provide rooms big enough for the crowds attending the rose show.

Accordingly, the third Grand National Rose-Show was held July 12, 1860, in the Crystal Palace in Sydenham. 16,000 people attended.

In 1861, the Royal Horticultural Society hosted the Fourth Grand National Rose-Show in Kensington on July 10. The rose show was held here every year through 1877. At that time the newly formed National Rose Society (founded 1876) took over the Grand National Rose-Show. The Very Reverend Reynolds Hole was the first president of the (Royal) National Rose Society.

The (Royal) National Rose Society set the standards for exhibition and judging of roses for the Grand National Rose-Show and for rose shows sponsored by affiliated local rose societies.

=== United States ===
The American Rose Society was founded in 1892. Initially, in contrast to the (Royal) National Rose Society in Great Britain, ARS membership was limited to professional nurserymen and florists. Amateur rosarians formed local rose societies, such as Portland (Oregon) in 1889, and Tacoma (Washington State) and Syracuse (New York State) in 1911. Tacoma had hosted rose shows as early as 1895.

The first ARS sponsored rose show was held in March 1900, in New York City. At that time the ARS was a trade organization of professional nurserymen and florists. A second show, allowing amateurs, was held that June. Roses were displayed as 25 stems or more of the same variety. Single-stem exhibits became standard by about 1938. Show classes were divided by color. Judging was left to the tastes and inclinations of individual judges up until standards started to be developed in the 1940s. The first ARS judging school was held in 1950, and the first published judging standards appeared in 1959. The first edition of the current Guidelines for Judging Roses was published in 1971.

The ARS first allowed amateur rosarians and local societies to join as affiliates in 1914. The Syracuse Rose Society, with 300 members, was the first local rose society to join the ARS, in May 1914.

Since 1974, the American Rose Society's headquarters and gardens have been located at the American Rose Center in Shreveport, Louisiana.

=== World Federation of Rose Societies ===
The World Federation of Rose Societies is an organization of national rose societies. It facilitates a world conference with a rose exhibition every three years, sponsored by a national society. It was founded in 1968. Founding member national societies were Australia, Belgium, Israel, New Zealand, Romania, South Africa, Great Britain and the US. Canada, India, Japan and Switzerland joined at the first conference in 1971 in New Zealand. Exhibitors bring roses from all over the world to exhibit at the World Conferences.

== Exhibition and judging standards ==
The American Rose Society sets guidelines and standards for rose shows in the US (and for Canadian rose societies affiliated with the ARS) and is the International Cultivar Registration Authority for Roses by appointment of the International Society for Horticultural Science. The Rose Society UK sets the guidelines and standards and organises rose shows in the UK. Many Canadian and Australian rose societies were affiliated with the RNRS in addition to their own national societies. Rose shows using ARS guidelines use cultivar classifications assigned by the ARS, for instance Hybrid Tea or Gallica. The ARS also assigns one of 18 official color classes to cultivars, for instance Light Yellow, Medium Yellow, Deep Yellow, and Yellow Blend. There is no color class for blue. Rose shows are hosted by local societies and may be organized as a local show, an ARS District show, or an ARS National show. Local shows generally require no registration or entry fees, while District and National shows do. All three levels of rose show generally offer three divisions: Challenge Classes, Horticulture, and Arrangements. Other divisions may be offered, for instance Rose Photography or Rose Crafts. Rose-themed Quilts have been included at rose shows. The Challenge Classes available vary between the local, District, and National levels.

The Horticulture division of a rose show consists of (usually) single specimens of roses – one 'Peace' rose in a vase, for instance. A few Horticulture classes call for multiple specimens, for instance 3 Stems Hybrid Tea, One Variety. In US shows, the Horticulture classes can be organized either alphabetically by name, i.e. 'Peace' would be exhibited under Hybrid Teas N-R; or by ARS color classes, i.e. 'Peace' would be exhibited under Hybrid Tea Yellow Blends. In some larger shows, popular varieties with many entries, such as 'Peace', may get their own class. The Challenge Classes division imposes special criteria on the exhibit, for instance Five Floribunda Sprays, Five Varieties, judged on both individual bloom quality and composition of the whole. There are five kinds of Challenge classes: multiple stems of multiple varieties of the same class; multiple stems of one variety; multiple stems of multiple classes; bloom progression (3 stems: bud, exhibition bloom, and open bloom with stamens showing); and English-style box (6 roses). Other popular Challenge classes include Most Fragrant, Rose in a Photo Frame, Rose in a Bowl, and Artist's Palette (5 roses, different colors). The Arrangements division consists of floral arrangements in which roses predominate.

The ARS offers a series of named Challenge classes, ranging in size from a single Grandiflora in an "appropriate" container, to 5 Old Garden roses in separate containers, to 6 All-American Rose Selection winners in separate containers, to 12 Miniature roses in a clear container.

Rose shows using ARS guidelines and standards are judged by ARS-accredited judges working in teams of three. Accreditation requires experience exhibiting, working as a show clerk, attending a judging school, and passing an exam and an apprenticeship. Judging schools in the US are held by the ARS Districts and are required to use the ARS-published Guidelines for Judging Roses as the text. The exam is a standardized national exam. Judges are required to audit the judging school every three years. The ARS has established standard certificates for awards at local society rose shows, for instance Queen, King, Princess; Classic Shrub, Modern Shrub. Local societies are free to use any or all of these certificates, plus other categories as desired.

Various publications are used by exhibitors to enter their roses in the right show category. The ARS publishes the Handbook for Selecting Roses, mailed to members annually, which lists most roses in commerce in North America and gives the official Exhibition Name, color class, petal count, year of introduction, and classification. The Combined Rose List is published annually and is used by exhibitors and judges as a reference for official cultivar names and unofficial synonyms, color category and classification, and year of introduction. It includes all roses known to be in commerce worldwide. The Guidelines for Judging Roses is published by the ARS and gives the standards by which roses are to be judged: Form, Color, Substance, Stem and Foliage, Balance and Proportion, and Size.

=== Exhibition form ===
Rose flowers come in different forms. Flowers may be cupped, globular, flat, imbricated (like a camellia) or high-centered. Exhibition flower form is defined by the ARS as a high-centered flower with a circular outline and petals that spiral outwards from the center in a symmetrical manner. In profile, the flower should form a cone. Most cultivars are exhibited at a stage from one-half to three-quarters open – enough to show the pointed center, with no stamens showing. Exhibition form roses must also produce long stems. Some rose cultivars are capable of producing flowers of exhibition form, while many others are not. These latter cultivars may be referred to as ‘garden’ or ‘decorative’ roses. A few cultivars may produce exhibition form flowers under certain weather conditions but not others. Rose shows may have special classes for the decorative roses separate from the exhibition roses. Queen of Show, the highest award, is generally reserved for roses of exhibition form. In 19th century rose shows, exhibition cultivars were mostly Hybrid Perpetuals and Teas. These have now fallen out of favor as exhibition roses and are relegated to separate classes for Old Garden Roses, not eligible for Queen of Show. Hybrid tea roses were developed early in the 20th century, with even higher-centered flowers and more symmetrical spiralling than the Hybrid Perpetuals were capable of producing, and quickly became the favored exhibition roses.

== Other exhibition types ==
Roses in the US are also shown at garden club shows and county fairs. These shows are generally not judged by ARS-accredited judges or by ARS judging standards. The National Council of State Garden Clubs trains and certifies judges for these shows, including sections on the judging of roses.

ARS-affiliated local rose societies may host rose shows that do not use the ARS guidelines or standards; these are often called Rose Displays and often are not judged at all, merely admired. Heritage rose groups, independent of the ARS, host non-judged Celebrations of Old Roses, as well as garden tours.

== See also ==
- Rose
  - List of Rosa species
- Garden roses
- List of rose cultivars named after people
- Rose garden
- Rose trial grounds
