= The Gardens of the American Rose Center =

Rose garden in Shreveport, Louisiana

The American Rose Center
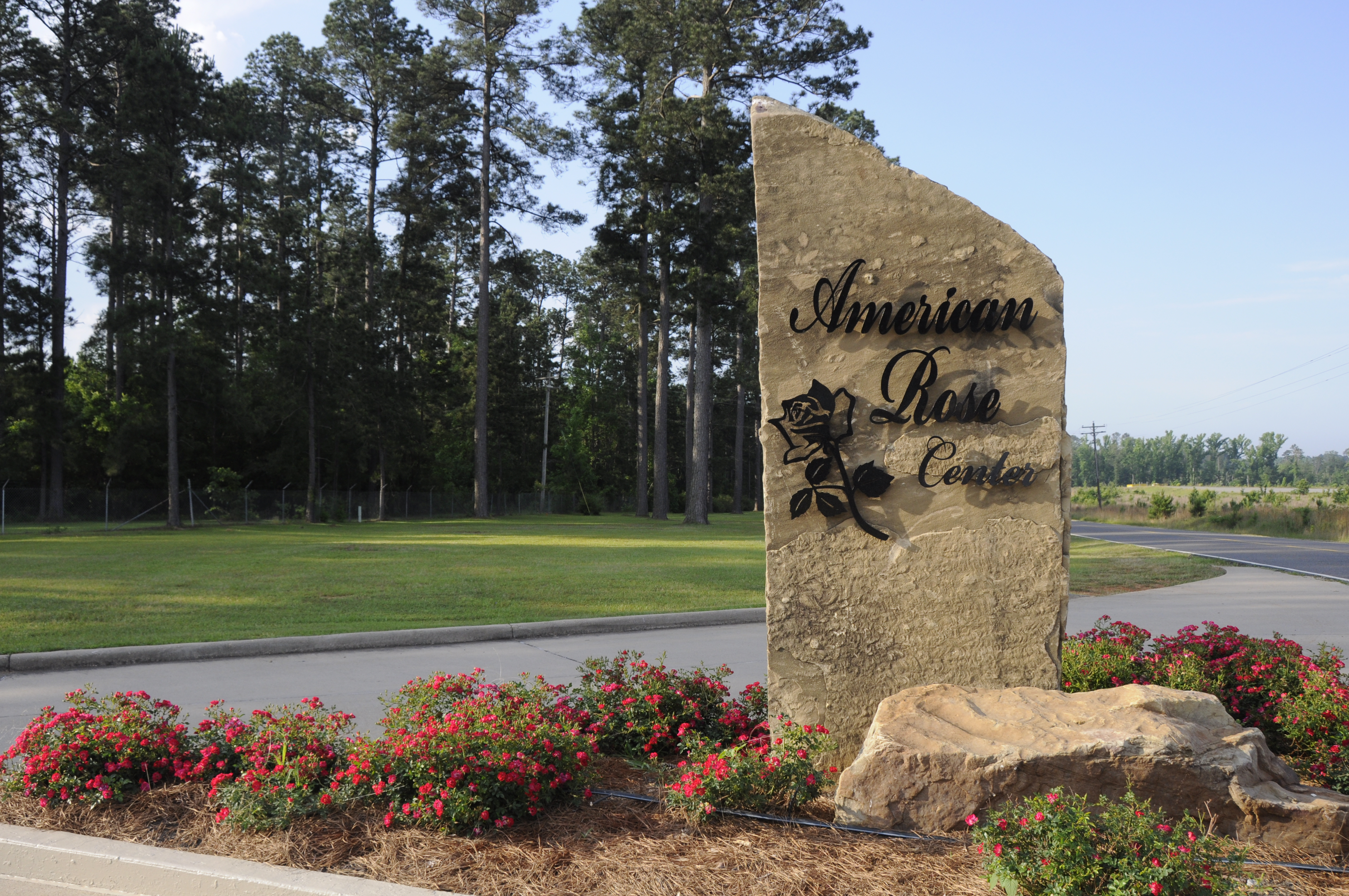

- Location within Louisiana
- Type: Rose garden
- Location: Shreveport, Louisiana
- Coordinates: 32.459545°N 93.950717°W
- Area: 118 acres (48 ha)
- Created: 1974
- Designer: Jackson & Perkins
- Operator: The American Rose Society
- Open: April 1 – October 31
- Plants: 20,000
- Species: 100
- Collections: 65 individual rose gardens
- Website: rose.org

The American Rose Center is a rose garden in Shreveport, Louisiana owned and operated by The American Rose Society. There are over 20,000 rose bushes of 100 varieties in 65 separate rose gardens on 118 acres of pine forests and woodlands.

== America's Rose Garden ==
The center's Mission & Vision statement is "Presenting the Rose, America's National Floral Emblem, in a natural setting of majestic pines and companion plants - for pleasure, education, and for the preservation and understanding of the beauty and significance of our favorite flower, the Rose."

The gardens feature roses of all types: the most modern hybrid tea roses, miniature roses, single petaled roses, heritage roses and species. The gardens are recognized as the largest park in the United States dedicated to roses.

The American Rose Center has supported the development and use of sustainable growing practices that do not degrade the environment; the grounds include a test garden for disease-resistant Hybrid Tea roses to demonstrate that exhibition-form roses can be grown without chemical intervention.

Annual events include an Easter Egg Hunt, Evening of Wine & Roses, horticulture symposiums, Green Thumb seminars, Spring Bloom, Angel of Hope Candlelight and Healing Ceremony annually on December 6, and Christmas in Roseland. Christmas in Roseland has been held every December since December 1983.

Rosie, a working dog and designated member of the staff, was used for several years to keep wildlife out of the gardens, particularly deer which can cause a lot of damage to the plants.

In 2016, the center dropped their fees for commercial and professional photographers, actively promoting the use of the gardens for proms and wedding photography.

In 2018, the gardens hosted the dedication ceremony for the U.S. Postal Service's newly issued Forever stamp celebrating the Peace Rose.

== American Rose Society ==
The American Rose Society (ARS) is a nonprofit corporation in Louisiana (formerly of Ohio and Pennsylvania) which owns the property of The American Rose Center. The gardens have been the home and national headquarters of the American Rose Society since 1974, when the non-profit organization moved from Columbus, Ohio, and before that, from Harrisburg, Pennsylvania. The Society was founded in 1892 in Harrisburg.

According to the ARS bylaws, their objectives are:

"to encourage amateur and professional rose culture; to provide rose horticulture education for ARS members and for the public; to increase the general understanding of and interest in all aspects of roses, including but not limited to the history of roses, hybridization, growing, exhibiting, artistic designing and judging, research, and thereby to improve the standard of excellence of the rose for all people; to record, publish and establish priority on rose cultivar names, and rose cultivar ratings."

ARS held its first rose show in 1900, and accredits judges for rose shows. Accreditation requires experience with growing roses, successful exhibition of roses, working as a show clerk, completing an accredited judging school, passing an exam, and apprenticing under an accredited judge.

ARS publishes several periodicals including American Rose magazine and American Rose Annual, and has published or co-authored several books such as Encyclopedia of Roses, Handbook for Selecting Roses: A Rose Buying Guide, A Guide to Creating Rose Arrangements, Standardized Rose Names, Guidelines and Rules for Judging Roses, Guidelines for Judging Rose Arrangements, and Consulting Rosarian Reference Manual.

Since 1955, the American Rose Society has been the designated International Cultivar Registration Authority for the Rosa genus, and maintains an online database called the Modern Roses Database. Guided by the International Code of Nomenclature for Cultivated Plants, the registration process prevents duplicate use of cultivar names, and ARS is charged with ensuring that new names are formally established.

== Restoration project ==
In 2017, ARS created a five-year master plan for the total restoration of the gardens called the Great Garden Restoration project. The project is a complete makeover for the gardens, consolidating the rambling multiple gardens into one core garden suitable for visitors. The project calls for the cutting back some of the encroaching pine forest and installing deer fencing.

The design for the garden layout resembles the gears of a vintage watch and the theme is "The History of the Rose in America". The design includes the stories of great roses such as Peace which has been the parent of many roses through hybridization, and Yellow Rose of Texas which traversed the country with early settlers of America. The story of the Grandiflora and Miniflora classes will be told, and the mission of "Rose Rustlers" who locate and preserve old lost roses found in cemeteries and old homesteads.

Part of the garden is dedicated to the "Father of the American Rose Society" J. Horace McFarland, an early leader, editor and publisher for the organization. This area of the gardens was named "McFarland Plaza" and a rose was named in his honor.

The American Rose Society will name the new garden America's Rose Garden, home of America's national floral emblem, the rose.

Other parts of the master plan include reaching botanical garden status, becoming recognized on the National Register of Historic Places, and becoming established internationally as a rose trial garden.

== Gallery ==
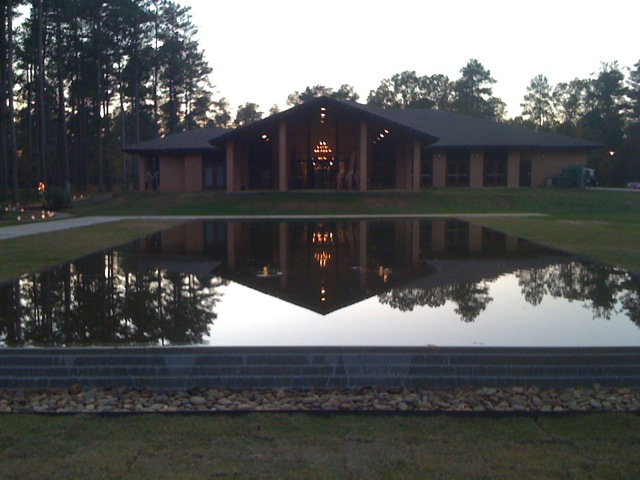
Klima and Watkins Pool at night

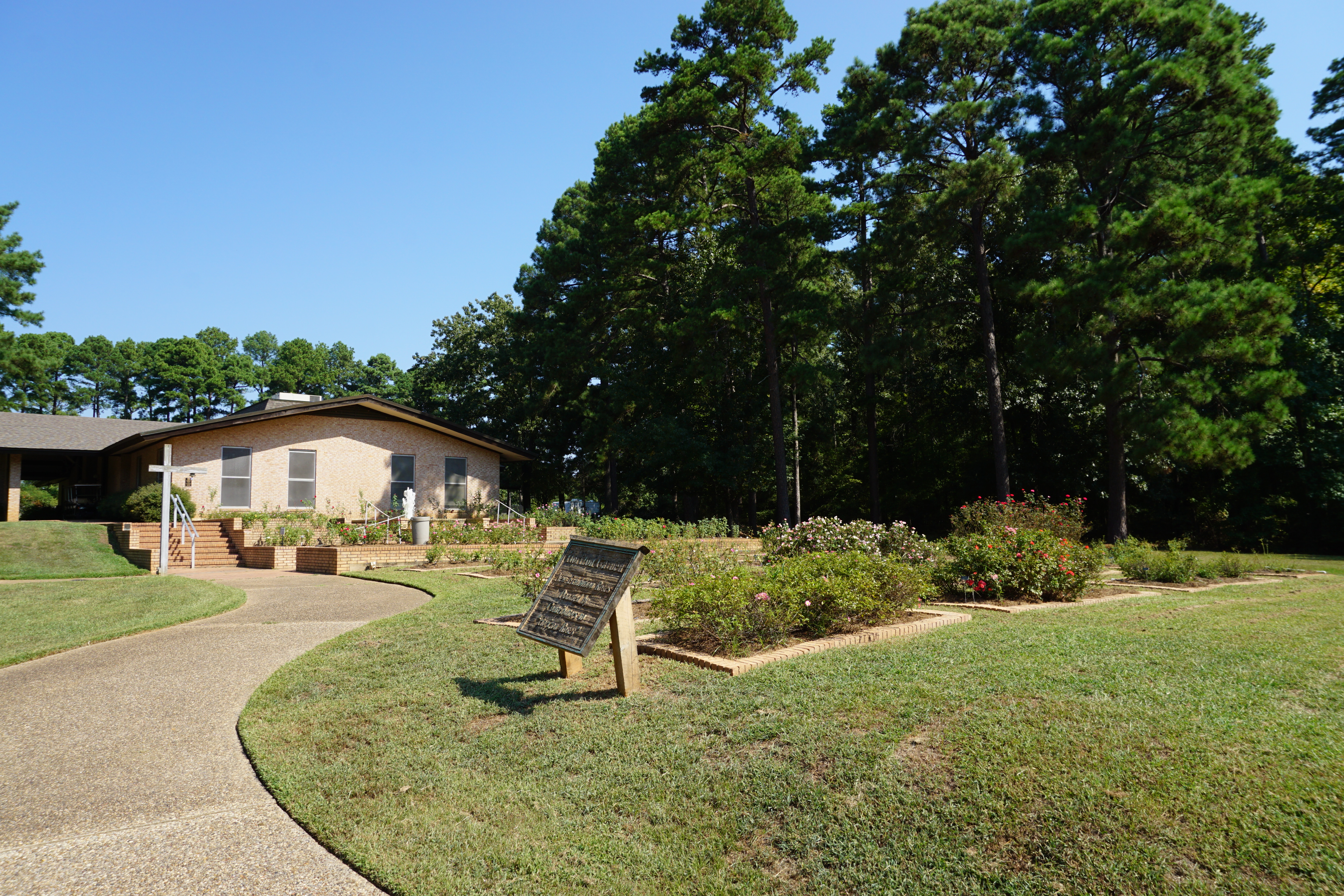

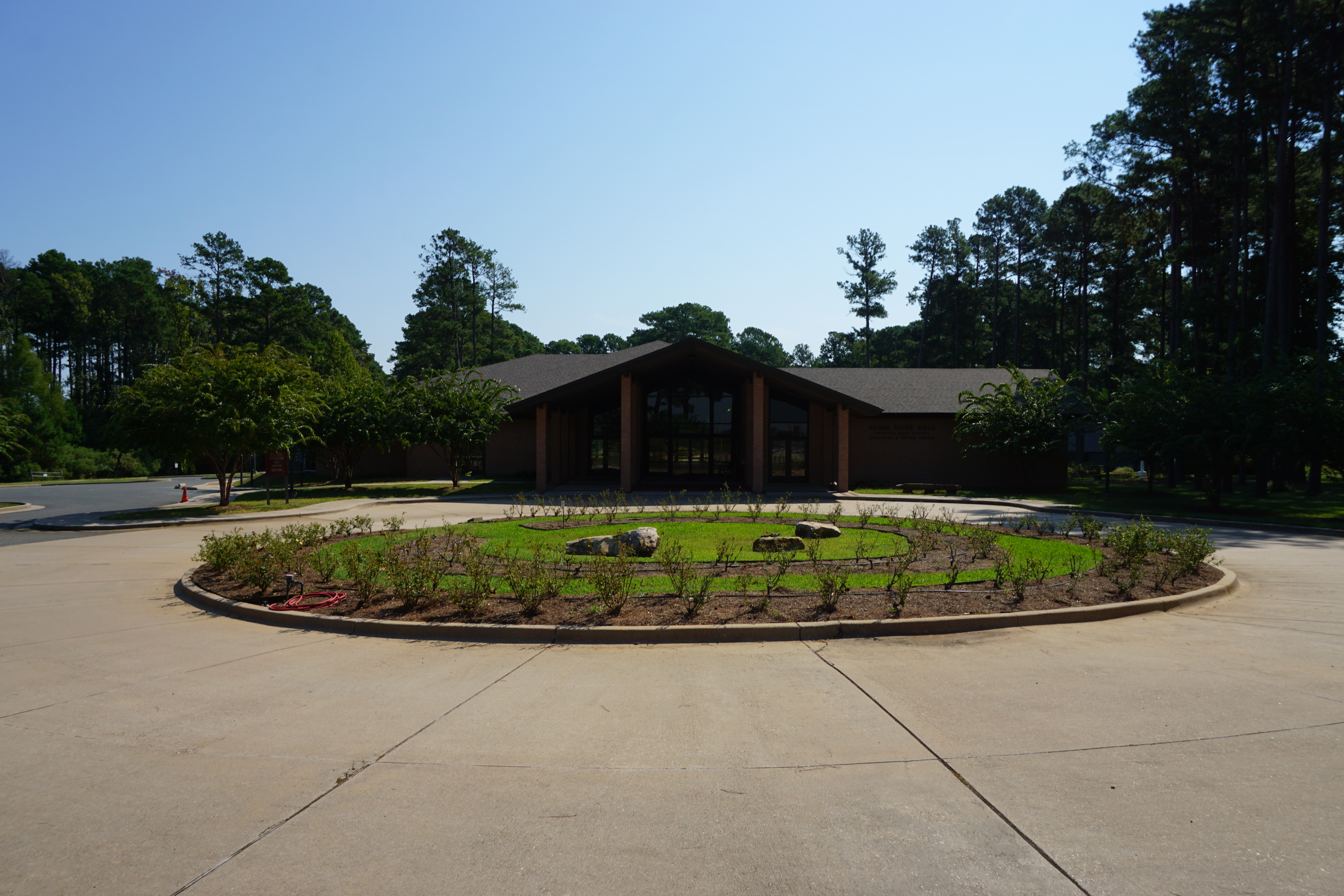

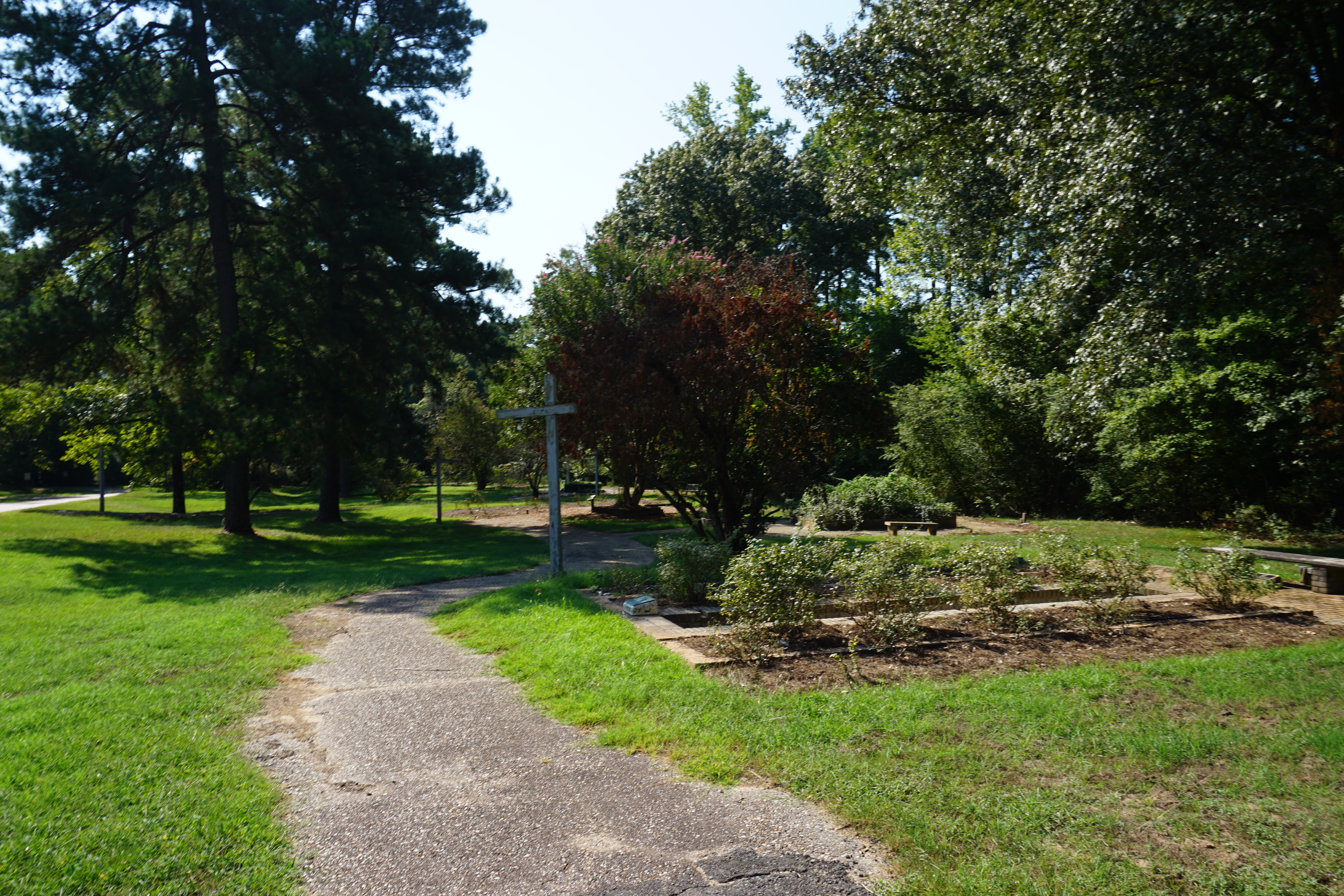

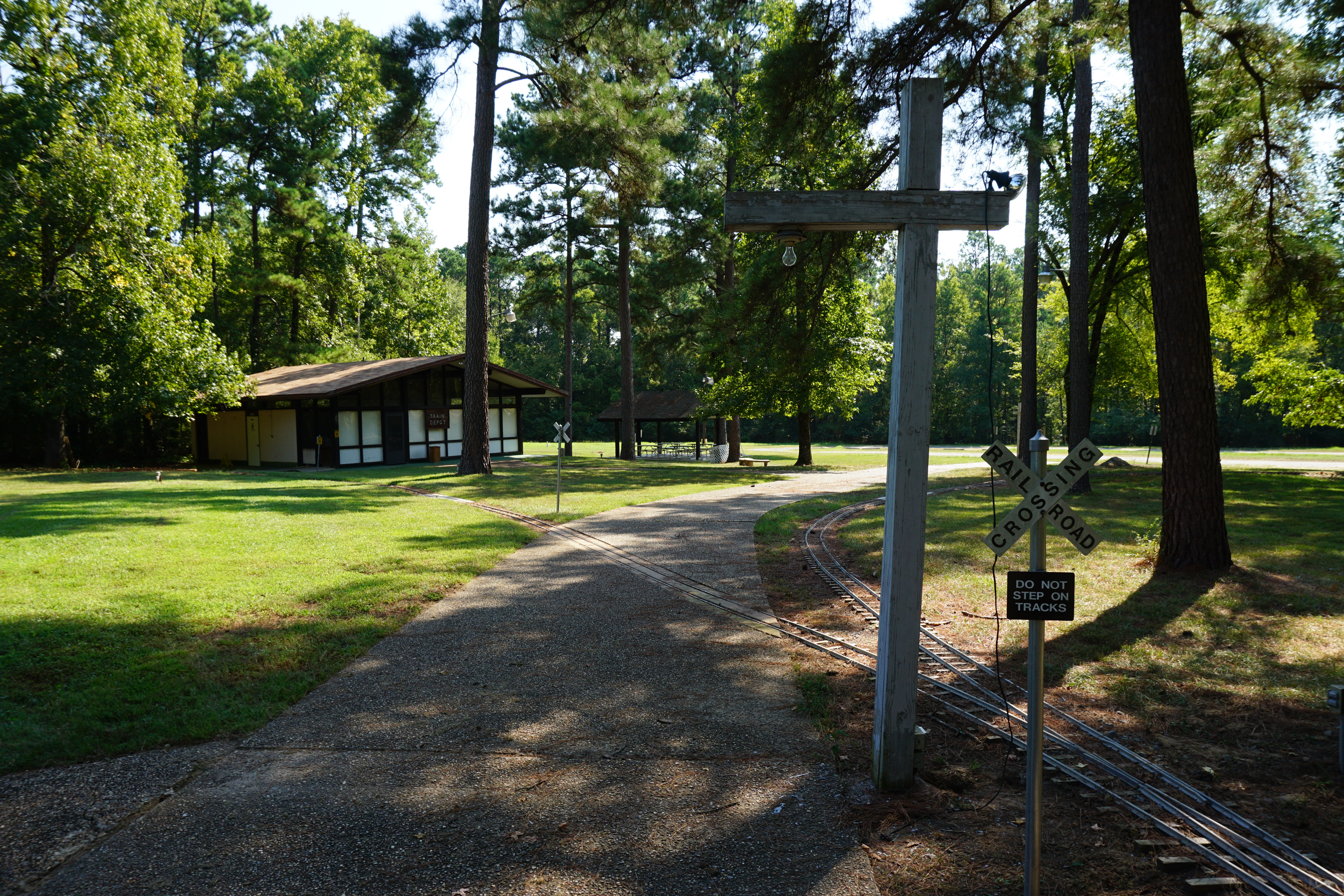

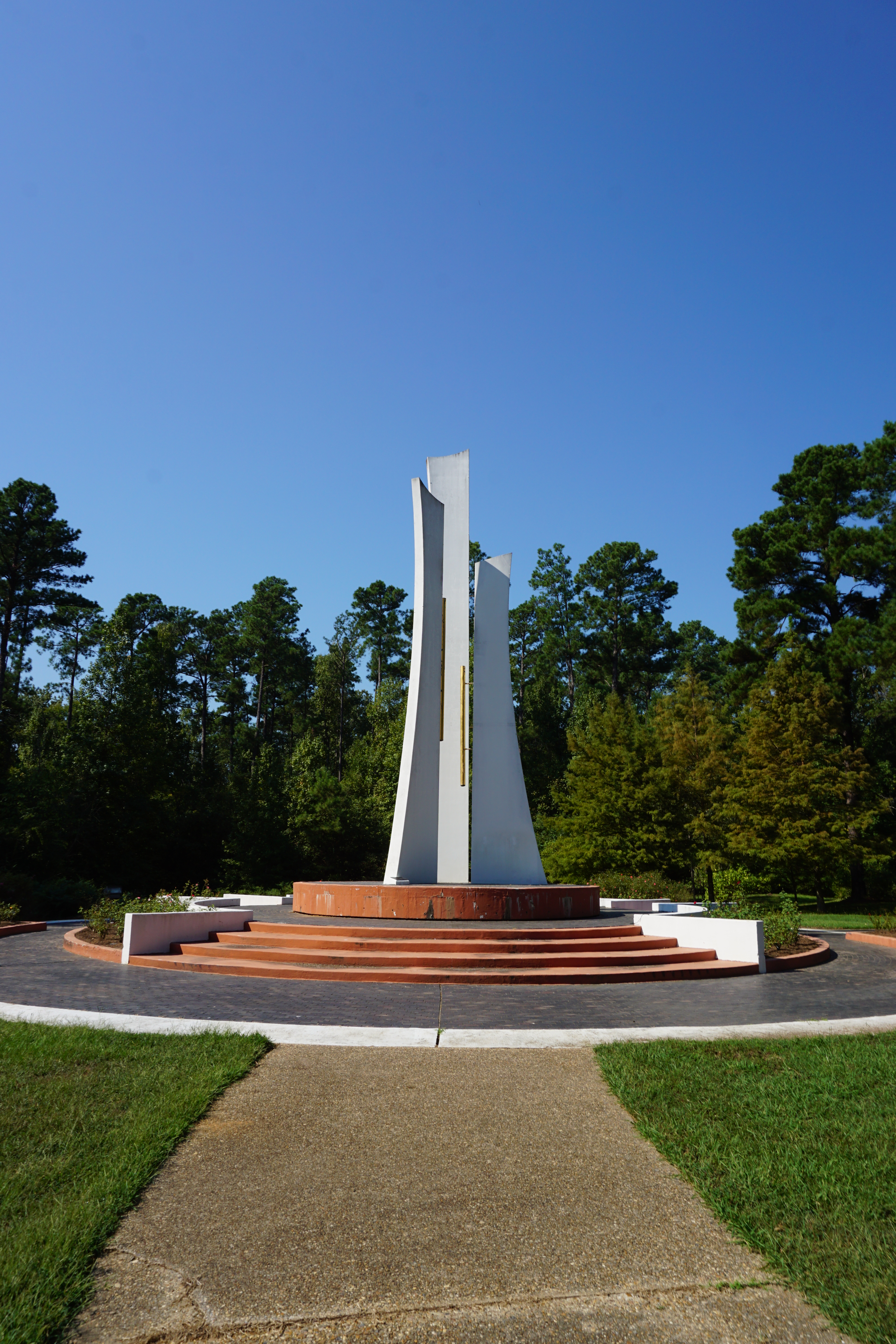

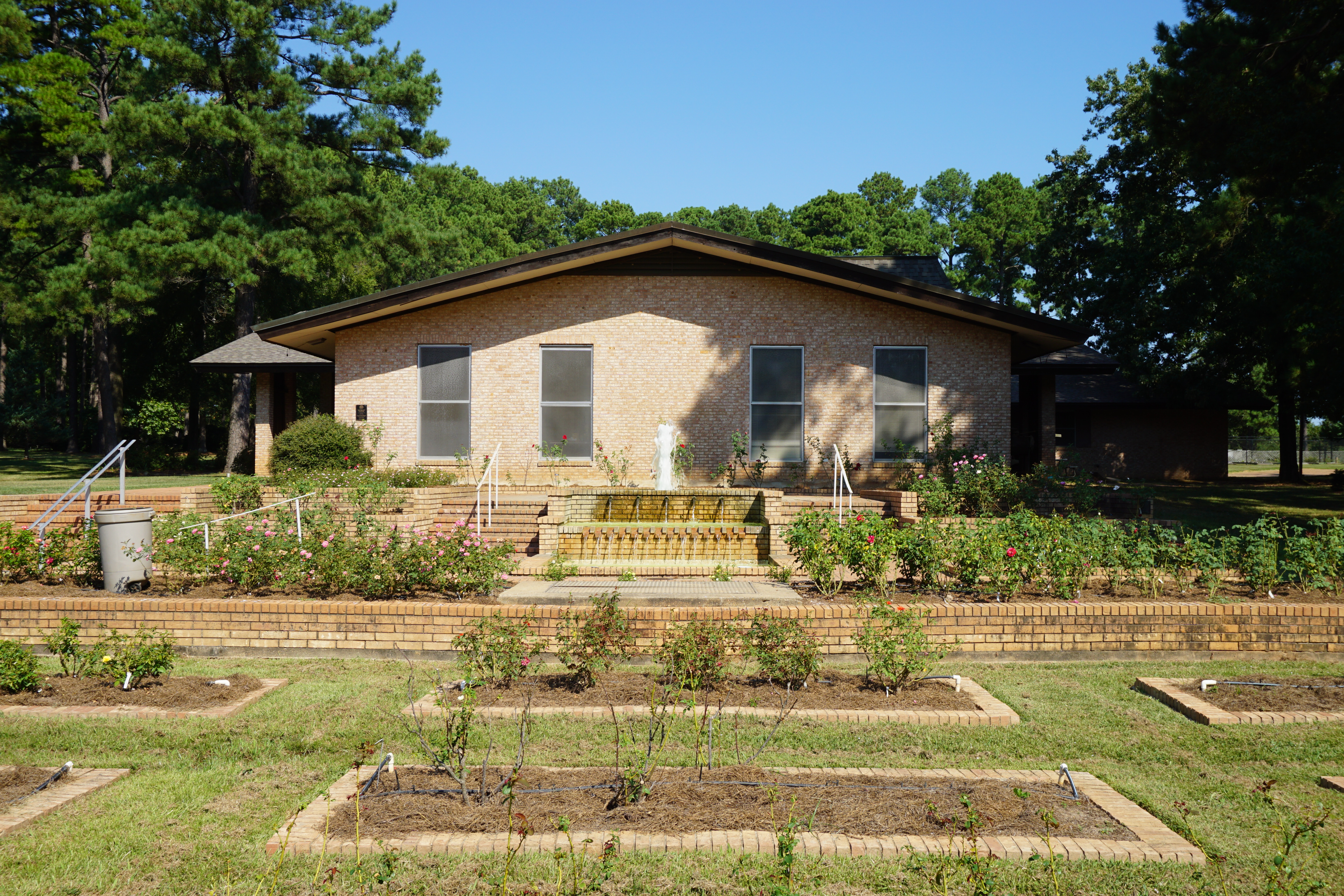

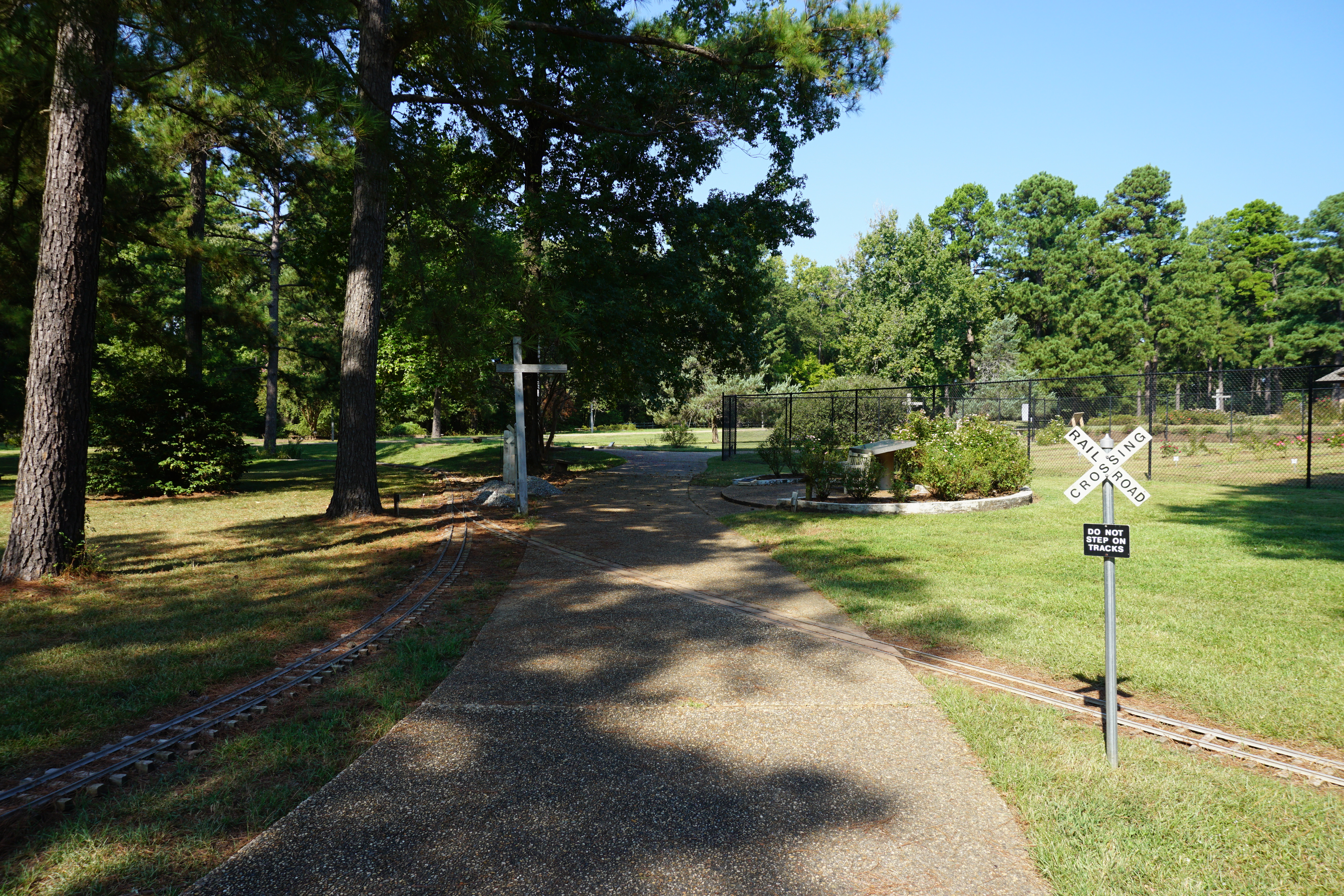

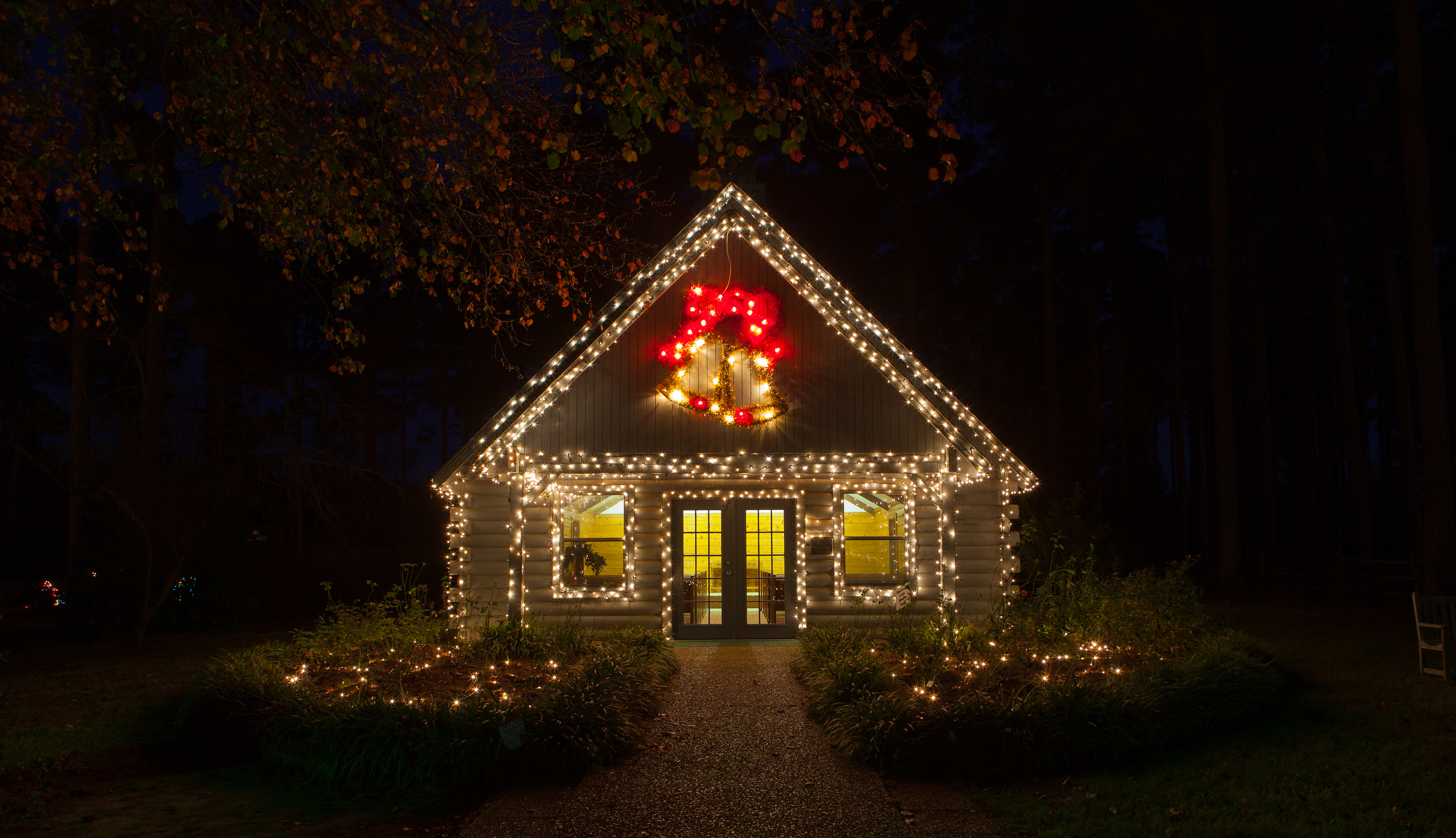
Christmas in Roseland

== See also ==
- List of botanical gardens in the United States
- List of Rosa species
- World Federation of Rose Societies
