= ADR rose =

Rose trial winner

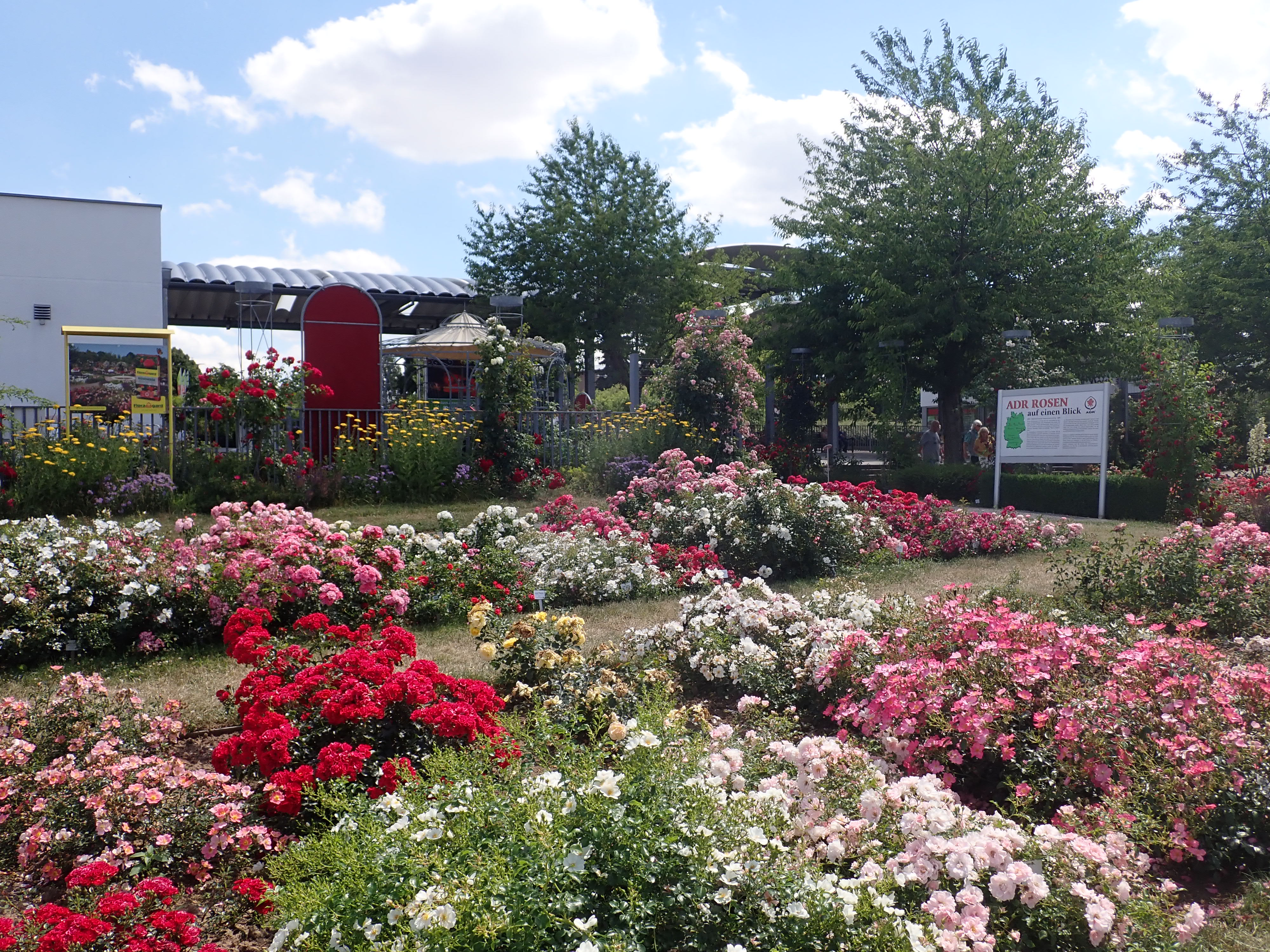
ADR roses collection in Europa-Rosarium Sangerhausen

An ADR rose is a winner in the German ADR rose trial (Allgemeine Deutsche Rosenneuheitenprüfung). No chemical pesticides have been allowed since 1997 and breeders often describe the trial as among the most challenging in the world. The trial is set up by a working group that includes the Bund deutscher Baumschulen (German nurseries association), rose breeders, and eleven independent trial stations in Germany. The trial results are analyzed by the Bundessortenamt (Federal Office of Plant Varieties).

Roses are tested over three years and criteria analyzed include disease resistance, hardiness, attractiveness, and habit. About 50 cultivars are judged annually and more than 2000 cultivars have been tested since the award's creation in the 1950s. Roses that no longer fulfill quality standards have their certificate removed. As of November 2013, 161 cultivars are recognized.

== List of ADR roses ==
ADR decision	Cultivar name	Breeder and introduction	Group	Image
1990	Heidetraum; Flower Carpet Pink (AUS, NZ, UK, USA, ZA)	Noack 1988	ground cover rose/patio rose	
1991	Wildfang	Noack 1989	ground cover rose	
1991	Apfelblüte	Noack 1992	ground cover rose	
1991	Super Excelsa	Hetzel 1986	climber rose	
1991	Schneeflocke; Flower Carpet White (AUS, NZ, UK, USA)	Noack 1991	floribunda rose	
1992	Rugelda	Kordes 1989	shrub rose	
1992	Palmengarten Frankfurt; Our Rosy Carpet (AUS)	Kordes 1988	patio rose	
1992	Rote Woge	Meilland/BKN 1990	shrub rose	
1992	Schöne Dortmunderin	Noack 1991	floribunda rose	
1993	Pink Bassino; St. Tiggywinkles (UK)	Kordes 1995	ground cover rose	
1993	Mirato; Chatsworth (UK)	Tantau 1990	ground cover rose	
1993	Armada; Trinity Fair (UK)	Harkness/Rosen-Union 1989	shrub rose	
1994	Bingo Meidiland	Meilland/BKN 1991	shrub rose	
1994	Dortmunder Kaiserhain	Noack 1995	shrub rose	
1995	Schneekönigin	Tantau 1992	ground cover rose	
1995	Magic Meidiland	Meilland/BKN 1992	ground cover rose	
1995	Windrose	Noack 1995	shrub rose	
1995	Medusa	Noack 1998	ground cover rose	
1995	Aspirin Rose; Special Child (UK); Glacier Magic (USA)	Tantau 1997	floribunda rose	
1995	Bayernland	Poulsen/Rosen-Union 1993	floribunda rose	
1996	Postillion	Kordes 1998	shrub rose	
1996	Felicitas	Kordes 1998	shrub rose	
1996	Sommerabend	Kordes 1995	patio rose	
1996	Rosenprofessor Sieber; The Halcyon Days Rose (UK)	Kordes 1997	floribunda rose	
1997	Manita	Kordes 1998	climber rose	
1998	Saremo	Noack 1998	ground cover rose	
1999	Celina; Sunshine (UK); Flower Carpet Yellow (USA)	Noack 1999	floribunda rose	
1999	Ravenna	Noack 1999	shrub rose/ground cover rose	
1999	Rotfassade	Noack 1999	climber rose	
1999	Neon; Sweet Vigorosa (USA)	Kordes 1999	floribunda rose/patio rose	
1999	Kronjuwel	Noack 1999	floribunda rose	
1999	Brautzauber	Noack 1999	floribunda rose	
2000	Nemo	Noack 2000	ground cover rose	
2000	Vinesse	Noack 2000	floribunda rose	
2000	Bad Birnbach; Busy Bee (AUS); Electric Blanket, Salmon Vigorosa (USA)	Kordes 2000	floribunda rose/patio rose	
2000	Maxi Vita; Caribbean Dawn (UK); Siena Vigorosa (USA); Dawn Sunsation (ZA)	Kordes 2000	floribunda rose/patio rose	
2001	Gärtnerfreude; Gardener's Pleasure (AUS); Lancashire (UK); Toscana Vigorosa (USA)	Kordes 2001	patio rose/floribunda rose	
2001	Medeo	Kordes 2001	patio rose/floribunda rose	
2001	Aprikola; Summer Beauty (UK); Apricot Vigorosa (USA)	Kordes 2001	floribunda rose	
2001	Phlox Meidiland	Meilland/BKN 2001	floribunda rose	
2001	Loredo; Flower Carpet Gold (AUS, NZ, USA, ZA)	Noack 2001	floribunda rose	
2002	Diamant; Diamond (UK); White Sunsation (ZA)	Kordes 2001	floribunda rose/patio rose	
2002	Fortuna; Fortuna Vigorosa (USA)	Kordes 2002	floribunda rose/patio rose	
2002	Rotilia; Red Finesse (UK); Ruby Vigorosa (USA)	Kordes 2000	floribunda rose/patio rose	
2002	Lions-Rose; Champagne Moment (UK); Lion's Fairy Tale (USA)	Kordes 2002	floribunda rose	
2002	Gebrüder Grimm; Gremlin (AUS); Eternal Flame (UK); Grimm Brothers Fairy Tale (USA)	Kordes 2002	floribunda rose	
2002	Purple Meidiland; Knock Out (USA)	Meilland/BKN 2001	floribunda rose	
2002	Kir Royal	Meilland/BKN 1995	climber rose	
2002	Simply	Noack 2003	floribunda rose/shrub rose	
2002	Venice	Noack 2003	ground cover rose	
2002	Diamond Border; Diamond Head (USA)	Poulsen/Rosen-Union 2000	floribunda rose/patio rose	
2003	Bad Wörishofen; Pink Emely	Kordes 2005	floribunda rose/patio rose	
2003	Innocencia; County of Yorkshire (UK)	Kordes 2003	patio rose/floribunda rose	
2003	Sonnenröschen	Kordes 2005	miniature rose/ground cover rose	
2003	Pink Swany	Meilland/BKN 2004	ground cover rose/floribunda rose	
2003	White Haze	Tantau 2005	ground cover rose/floribunda rose	
2004	Resonanz	Noack 2005	floribunda rose	
2004	Isarperle	Noack 2004	floribunda rose	
2004	Cantario	Noack 2005	floribunda rose	
2004	Sommerfreude	Noack 2005	floribunda rose	
2004	Pepita	Kordes 2004	miniature rose	
2004	Petticoat; Make-A-Wish (AUS)	Kordes 2004	floribunda rose	
2004	Sunny Rose	Kordes 2001	patio rose/floribunda rose	
2004	Gelber Engel	Kordes 2002	floribunda rose	
2004	Charmant	Kordes 1999	miniature rose	
2004	Knirps; Little Chap (AUS, USA); County of Hampshire (UK)	Kordes 1997	patio rose/floribunda rose	
2004	Kaiser von Lautern	Michler/Rosen-Union 2002	floribunda rose/shrub rose	
2004	So Pretty	Meilland/BKN 2005	floribunda rose/shrub rose	
2004	Rouge Meilove	Meilland/BKN 2005	floribunda rose	
2004	Sweet Haze	Tantau 2003	ground cover rose	
2004	Satina; Harewood (UK)	Tantau 1992	ground cover rose	
2005	UNICEF-Rose	Kordes 2007	floribunda rose/patio rose	
2005	Roter Korsar; Temptress (AUS, UK); Red Corsair (USA)	Kordes 2004	shrub rose	
2005	Grande Amore; My Valentine (UK); Walter Sisulu (ZA)	Kordes 2004	hybrid tea rose	
2005	Eliza; Sweet Memory (AUS)	Kordes 2004	hybrid tea rose	
2005	Red Leonardo da Vinci	Meilland/BKN 2002	floribunda rose	
2005	Limesglut; Raspberry Royale (EU, UK)	Pearce/Rosen-Union 2005	ground cover rose	
2005	Canzonetta	Noack 2004	floribunda rose	
2005	Crescendo	Noack 2004	floribunda rose	
2005	Inspiration	Noack 2004	hybrid tea rose	
2005	Getano	Noack 2006	shrub rose	
2006	Escimo; Silver Ghost (UK)	Kordes 2006	patio rose	
2006	Blühwunder 08	Kordes 2008	patio rose	
2006	Pomponella; Pomponella Fairy Tale (USA)	Kordes 2005	floribunda rose/patio rose	
2006	Golden Gate	Kordes 2005	climber rose	
2006	Juanita	Kordes 2007	patio rose	
2006	Lavender Meidiland	Meilland/BKN 2008	shrub rose	
2006	Pretty Kiss	Meilland/BKN 2010	shrub rose	
2006	Alea	Noack 2007	floribunda rose	
2006	Sinea	Noack 2007	floribunda rose/shrub rose	
2006	Flashlight	Noack 2006	shrub rose	
2006	Gateway	Noack 2008	shrub rose	
2006	Sorrento	Noack 2005/2006	ground cover rose	
2006	Medley Pink	Noack 2002/2003	floribunda rose	
2007	Laguna	Kordes 2004	climber rose	
2007	Jasmina	Kordes 2005	climber rose	
2007	Lupo	Kordes 2006	miniature rose	
2007	Elysium	Kordes 2011	floribunda rose	
2007	Cherry Girl	Kordes 2009	floribunda rose	
2007	KOSMOS; Good Bye Polio (USA)	Kordes 2006	floribunda rose	
2007	Sunstar; Strikes Gold (UK)	Kordes 2007	floribunda rose	
2007	Elbflorenz; Line Renaud	Meilland/BKN 2006	hybrid tea rose	
2007	Pretty Sunrise	Meilland/BKN 2005	patio rose	
2007	Westzeit	Noack 2004	floribunda rose	
2007	Stadt Rom	Tantau 2007	ground cover rose	
2007	Satin Haze	Tantau 2005	ground cover rose	
2007	La Rose de Molinard	Delbard/Weber/Hallen	shrub rose	
2007	Pastella	Tantau 2004	floribunda rose	
2008	Karl Ploberger Rose	Kordes 2009	shrub rose	
2008	Gletscherfee	Kordes 2011	floribunda rose	
2008	Sommersonne	Kordes 2008	floribunda rose	
2008	Larissa	Kordes 2008	patio rose	
2008	Roxy	Kordes 2007	miniature rose	
2008	Intarsia	Noack 2009	floribunda rose	
2008	New Look	Noack 2009	shrub rose/climber rose	
2008	Mademoiselle	Delbard/Weber	shrub rose	
2008	Schloss Ippenburg; Prince Jardinier	Meilland/BKN 2006	hybrid tea rose	
2008	Yellow Meilove	Meilland/BKN 2007	floribunda rose	
2008	Stadt Aschersleben	Meilland/BKN 2011	patio rose	
2008	Candia Meidiland	Meilland/BKN 2007	patio rose	
2008	Fleur Robuste Polo	Boot & Co/Rosen-Union	ground cover rose	
2009	Garden of Roses; Joie de Vivre (UK)	Kordes 2006	floribunda rose	
2009	Schöne Koblenzerin	Kordes 2011	floribunda rose	
2009	Planten un Blomen	Kordes 2008	floribunda rose	
2009	Dolomiti	Kordes 2011	floribunda rose	
2009	La Perla	Kordes 2008	hybrid tea rose	
2009	Solero	Kordes 2009	shrub rose/floribunda rose	
2009	Goldspatz	Kordes 2011	shrub rose	
2009	Sedana; Flower Carpet Amber	Noack 2005	patio rose	
2009	Deseo	Noack 2010	shrub rose	
2009	Shining Light	Noack 2011	shrub rose	
2009	Pretty Snow	Meilland/BKN 2008	shrub rose	
2010	Souvenir de Baden-Baden	Kordes 2008	hybrid tea rose	
2010	Black Forest Rose	Kordes 2010	floribunda rose	
2010	Bengali	Kordes 2011	floribunda rose	
2010	Topolina	Kordes 2012	ground cover rose	
2010	Hella	Kordes 2009	climber rose	
2010	Bajazzo	Kordes 2011	climber rose	
2010	Lipstick	Tantau 2009	ground cover rose	
2010	Cute Haze	Tantau 2011	floribunda rose	
2010	Hermann-Hesse-Rose	Noack 2008	floribunda rose	
2010	Silencio	Noack 2011	floribunda rose	
2010	Comedy	Noack 2011	shrub rose	
2011	Flirt	Kordes 2011	patio rose	
2011	Matador	Tantau 2012	ground cover rose	
2011	Debüt	Noack 2012	floribunda rose	
2011	Residenz	Noack 2012	floribunda rose	
2011	Pink Paradise	Delbard 2011	hybrid tea rose	
2012	Charisma	Noack 2011	hybrid tea rose	
2012	Balou	Noack 2013	floribunda rose	
2012	Westart	Noack 2010	floribunda rose	
2012	Camelot	Tantau 2010	climber rose	
2012	Guirlande d'Amour	Lens/Clausen 1993	climber rose	
2013	Oh Happy Day	Kordes 2015	hybrid tea rose	
2013	Portorož; Garden Living Fair (DK)	Kordes 2014	floribunda rose	
2013	Gartenfreund	Kordes 2013	floribunda rose	
2013	Novalis	Kordes 2010	floribunda rose	
2013	Sirius	Tantau 2013	shrub rose	
2013	Perennial Blue	Tantau/Mehring 2008	climber rose/rambler rose	
2013	Libertas	Tantau 2015	climber rose	
2013	Sabrina	Meilland/BKN 2008	climber rose	
2014	Evelin	Noack 2012	floribunda rose	
2014	Heidetraum PLUS	Noack 2012	climber rose	
2014	Rosenfaszination	Kordes 2013	floribunda rose	
2014	Gräfin Diana	Kordes 2012	hybrid tea rose	
2014	Madame Anisette	Kordes 2013	hybrid tea rose	
2014	Hedi Grimm	Lens/Clausen	floribunda rose	
2019	Moscalbò	Davide Dalla Libera/Dräger	climber rose	

== List of former ADR roses ==
ADR decision	Cultivar name	Breeder and introduction	Image
1950	Elmshorn	Kordes 1951	
1950	Gelbe Holstein	Kordes 1949	
1950	Schweizer Gruß	Tantau 1952	
1952	Atombombe	Kordes 1953	
1952	Flammentanz	Kordes 1955	
1952	Sparrieshoop	Kordes 1952	
1954	Dortmund	Kordes 1955	
1954	Feuermeer	Kordes 1954	
1955	Lampion	Tantau 1957	
1956	Olala	Tantau 1956	
1958	Anneke Doorenbos	Tantau 1956	
1958	Dirigent	Tantau 1956	
1958	Jydepige	Kordes/O. Bang 1959	
1958	Lagerfeuer	Tantau 1958	
1958	Madame Louis Laperrière	Laperriere/Wohlt 1955	
1960	Fritz Thiedemann	Tantau 1959	
1960	Goldkrone	Kordes 1960	
1960	Gruß an Heidelberg	Kordes 1959	
1960	Hansestadt Bremen	Kordes 1958	
1960	Honigmond	Kordes 1960	
1960	Insel Mainau	Kordes 1959	
1960	Kommodore	Tantau 1959	
1960	Lilli Marleen	Kordes 1959	
1960	Meteor	Kordes 1959	
1960	Parkdirektor Riggers	Kordes 1957	
1960	Praise of Jiro	Kordes 1959	
1960	Rodeo	Kordes 1960	
1960	Schneewittchen; Iceberg (worldwide)	Kordes 1958	
1960	Signalfeuer	Tantau 1959	
1960	Stadt Rosenheim	Kordes 1961	
1963	Goldtopas	Kordes 1963	
1963	Gruß an Koblenz	Kordes 1963	
1964	Attraktion	Tantau 1963	
1964	Duftwolke	Tantau 1963	
1964	Finale	Kordes 1964	
1964	Gruß an Berlin	Kordes 1964	
1964	Horrido	Tantau 1963	
1964	Inge Horstmann	Tantau 1964	
1964	Königin der Rosen	Kordes 1964	
1964	Mainzer Fastnacht	Tantau 1964	
1964	Marlena	Kordes 1964	
1964	Neues Europa	Kordes 1965	
1964	Nordstern	Schmidt/Kordes 1964	
1964	Reinolds Reingold	Nolte/Reinold 1967	
1965	Andenken an Rudolf Schmidt	Kordes/Schmidt 1966	
1965	Fidelio	Meilland/BKN 1964	
1965	Geisha	Tantau 1964	
1965	Maria Callas	Meilland/BKN 1965	
1965	Molde	Tantau 1964	
1965	My Fair Lady	Kordes/Horstmann 1964	
1965	Silva	Meilland/BKN 1964	
1965	Sympathie	Kordes 1964	
1965	Wiener Walzer	Tantau 1964	
1966	Carina	Meilland/BKN 1963	
1966	Konfetti	Tantau 1965	
1966	Mainauperle	Kordes 1969	
1966	Pariser Charme	Tantau 1965	
1966	Sangria	Meilland/BKN 1966	
1966	Travemünde	Kordes 1968	
1967	Caramba	Tantau 1966	
1967	John Dijkstra	Buisman/Tantau 1965	
1967	Nordkap	Schmidt 1966	
1967	Sahara	Tantau 1966	
1967	Shannon	McGredy/Kordes 1965	
1967	Späth 250	Kordes 1970	
1968	Bischofsstadt Paderborn	Kordes 1964	
1968	Ferry Porsche	Kordes 1971	
1968	Lichtkönigin Lucia	Kordes 1966	
1969	Erotica	Tantau 1968	
1969	Lustige	Kordes 1973	
1969	Neue Revue	Kordes 1969	
1969	Sophia Loren	Tantau 1967	
1969	Susan	Kordes 1970	
1969	Taora	Tantau 1968	
1970	Aenne Burda	Kordes 1973	
1970	Charivari	Kordes 1971	
1970	Edelweiß	Poulsen 1969	
1970	Herzog von Windsor	Tantau 1969	
1970	Walzertraum	Tantau 1969	
1971	Alexandra	Kordes 1973	
1971	Baronne Edmond de Rothschild	Meilland/BKN 1969	
1971	Fontaine	Tantau 1969	
1971	Gütersloh	Noack 1969	
1971	Ponderosa	Kordes 1970	
1971	Princess Margaret of England	Meilland/BKN 1968	
1971	Prominent	Kordes 1971	
1971	Starina	Meilland/BKN 1965	
1972	Benvenuto	Meilland/BKN 1967	
1972	Gertrud Schweitzer	Kordes/Horstmann 1973	
1972	Hartina	Tantau/Ahrens+Sieberz 1971	
1972	Pussta	Tantau 1972	
1972	Rebecca	Tantau 1970	
1972	Schloss Mannheim	Kordes 1975	
1972	Tornado	Kordes 1973	
1972	Uwe Seeler	Kordes 1971	
1973	Alec's Red	Cocker/Rosen-Union 1970	
1973	Escapade	Harkness/Rosen-Union 1969	
1973	Friesia; Korresia (UK); Sunsprite (USA)	Kordes 1973	
1973	Gruß an Bayern	Kordes 1971	
1973	Lolita	Kordes 1972	
1973	Ludwigshafen am Rhein	Kordes 1975	
1973	Melina	Tantau 1973	
1974	Alexander	Harkness/Rosen-Union 1972	
1974	Florentina	Kordes 1973	
1974	Montana	Tantau 1974	
1974	Westerland	Kordes 1969	
1975	Amsterdam	Verschuren/Wohlt 1973	
1975	Dalli Dalli	Tantau 1977	
1975	Freude	Kordes 1974	
1975	Happy Wanderer	McGredy/Rosen-Union 1974	
1975	Morning Jewel	Cocker/Rosen-Union 1968	
1976	Andalusien	Kordes 1977	
1976	Compassion	Harkness/Rosen-Union 1974	
1976	Matangi	McGredy/Kordes 1975	
1977	Chorus	Meilland/BKN 1975	
1977	Grandhotel	McGredy/Kordes 1975	
1977	Schneeweißchen	Tantau/Horstmann 1992	
1977	Sylvia	Kordes 1978	
1978	Coppélia '76	Meilland/BKN 1976	
1978	Mildred Scheel	Tantau 1976	
1978	Yesterday	Harkness/Rosen-Union 1974	
1979	La Sevillana	Meilland/BKN 1978	
1980	Red Yesterday; Marjorie Fair (UK, USA)	Harkness/Rosen-Union 1978	
1980	Robusta	Kordes 1979	
1982	Aachener Dom	Meilland/BKN 1982	
1982	Angela	Kordes 1984	
1982	Bonica 82	Meilland/BKN 1982	
1982	IGA 83 München	Meilland/BKN 1982	
1984	Bonanza	Kordes 1983	
1984	Rosenresli	Kordes 1986	
1985	Banzai 83	Meilland/BKN 1983	
1985	Goldener Sommer '83	Noack 1983	
1986	Berolina; Selfridges (UK)	Kordes 1986	
1986	Pink La Sevillana	Meilland/BKN 1984	
1986	Ravensberg	Noack 1986	
1986	Repandia	Kordes 1982	
1986	Romanze	Tantau 1984	
1987	Dolly	Poulsen/Rosen-Union 1975	
1987	Elina; Peaudouce (UK)	Dickson/Rosen-Union 1984	
1987	Lavender Dream	Ilsink/Kordes 1985	
1987	Pink Meidiland	Meilland/BKN 1984	
1987	Sommerwind; Surrey (UK)	Kordes 1985	
1988	Rödinghausen	Noack 1987	
1989	Burghausen	Kordes 1991	
1989	Marondo	Kordes 1991	
1989	Play Rose	Meilland/BKN 1989	
1989	Ricarda	Noack 1989	
1989	Vogelpark Walsrode	Kordes 1988	
1991	Richard Strauss	Noack 1989	
1992	Rosa rugosa 'Pierette'	Uhl/Tantau 1990	
1993	Georgette	Kordes 1995	
1993	Hagenbecks Tierpark	Meilland/BKN 1995	
1993	Mazurka	Meilland/BKN 1994	
1993	Rosa rugosa 'Foxi'	Uhl/Tantau 1989	
1993	Schneesturm	Tantau 1990	
1993	Vicky	Noack 1993	
1994	Blühwunder	Kordes 1995	
1994	Rosa rugosa 'Baums Rokoko'	Baum 1987	
1994	Rosa rugosa 'Rotes Meer'	Baum 1983	
1995	Hannovers Weiße	Noack 1997	
1995	Melissa	Noack 1996	
1995	Northern Lights	Noack 1997	
1996	Crimson Meidiland	Meilland/BKN 1996	
1996	Queen Mother	Kordes 1998	
1997	Arcadia	Noack 1998	
1997	Danica	Noack 1998	
1998	Estima	Noack 1998	
1998	Rosa rugosa 'Rote Apart'	Uhl 1978	
2001	Famosa	Noack 2003	
2002	Leona	Noack 2003	
2002	Triade	Noack 2003	
2003	Rosa rugosa 'Pink Road Runner'	Uhl/Kordes 2001	
2003	Rosa rugosa 'Smart Roadrunner'	Uhl/Kordes 2002	
2004	Pink Meilove	Meilland/BKN 2006	
2004	Tascaria	Noack 2005	
2005	Soft Meidiland	Meilland/BKN 2004	
2005	Sweet Meidiland	Meilland/BKN 2003	
2006	Criollo	Noack 2004	
2006	Rosa rugosa 'Rote Hannover'	Boot/Rosen-Union 1998	
2009	Salmon Meilove	Meilland/BKN 2009	
2009	Smooth Meidiland	Meilland/BKN 2007	

== See also ==
- List of Award of Garden Merit roses
- Rose Hall of Fame
