= Rose trial grounds =

Agricultural areas where garden roses are assessed

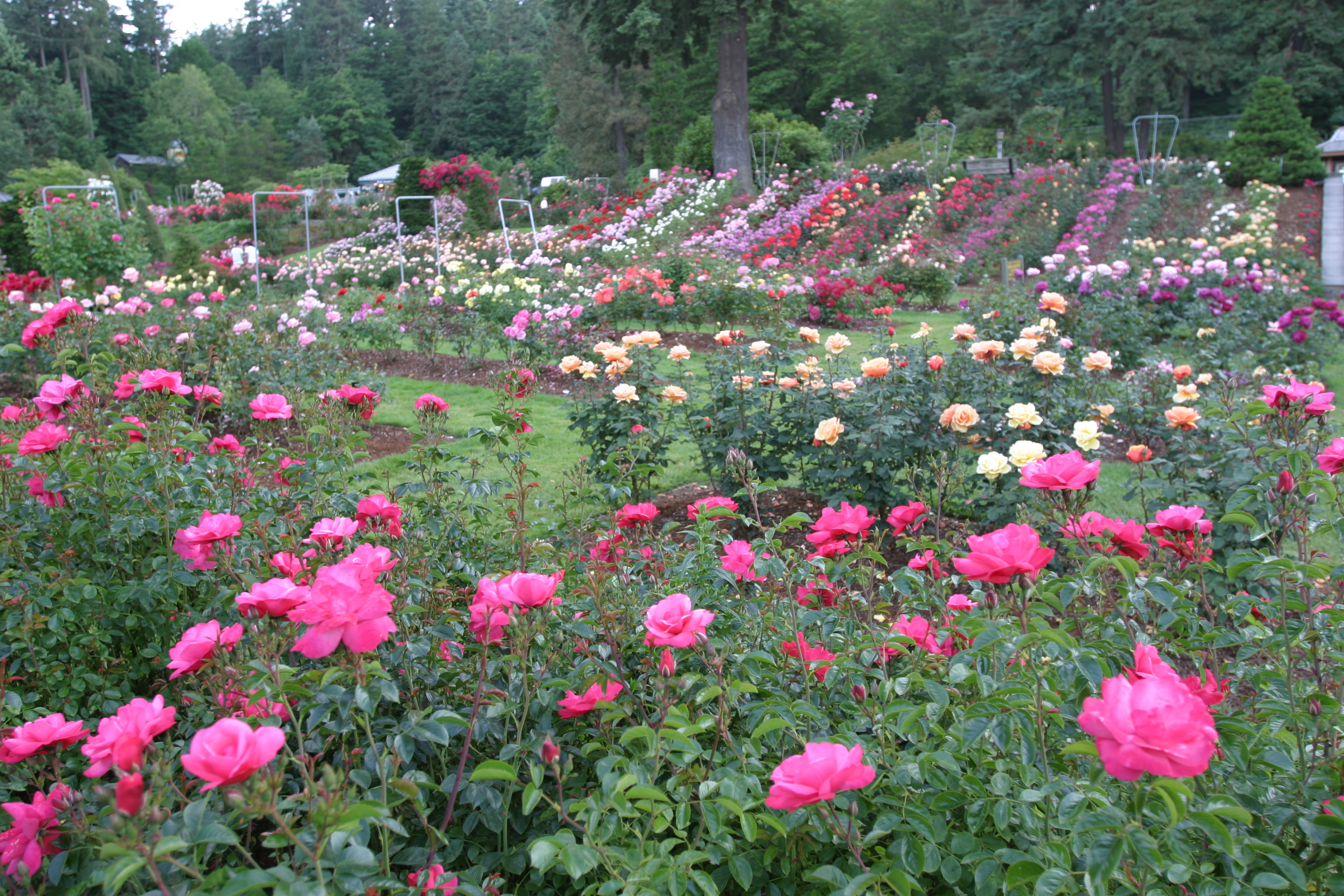
International Rose Test Garden in Portland, Oregon

Rose trial grounds or rose test gardens are agricultural areas where garden roses are grown to be assessed for qualities such as health, floriferousness, novelty, and scent.

Roses on trial are usually considered for awards of merit or medals at the end of the trial period. Roses that win an award may be more likely to have commercial success. Forty per cent of all roses sold in the U.S. have won All-America Rose Selections. Similarly, the UK Rose of the Year award usually guarantees that a particular variety will be widely available at garden centres and through mailorder rose suppliers.

== Testing ==
Typically, roses are grown for two years in a test area (usually a dedicated rose bed) to judge them over a period of time, In the UK the trial grounds are, from 2020, at Rochfords in Hertford, where the new roses are judged on the trial grounds over a three-year growing period. In the United States the All-America Rose Selections (AARS), which were first introduced in 1938, were awarded annually until 2013 based on the results of testing in 21 gardens across the US over a two-year period. Roses which scored highly across all judging areas in a variety of climates were awarded this national award. Since 2013, two separate multi-site rose trialing programs have emerged. The first, the American Garden Rose Selections (AGRS) is very similar to AARS, while the second, the American Rose Trials for Sustainability (ARTS) takes a thoroughly scientific approach. Another multi-site trial is the ADR in Germany.

In most cases, roses are identified by a number during the trial period, with their identity not revealed until after final judging. A local panel of judges may assess them throughout the trial period, although at some trials there may be an invited national or international panel. Roses are generally judged within a category, such as Hybrid Tea, Floribunda, or patio rose, to fairly compare like styles. There are specific awards for fragrance, which are judged across all categories.

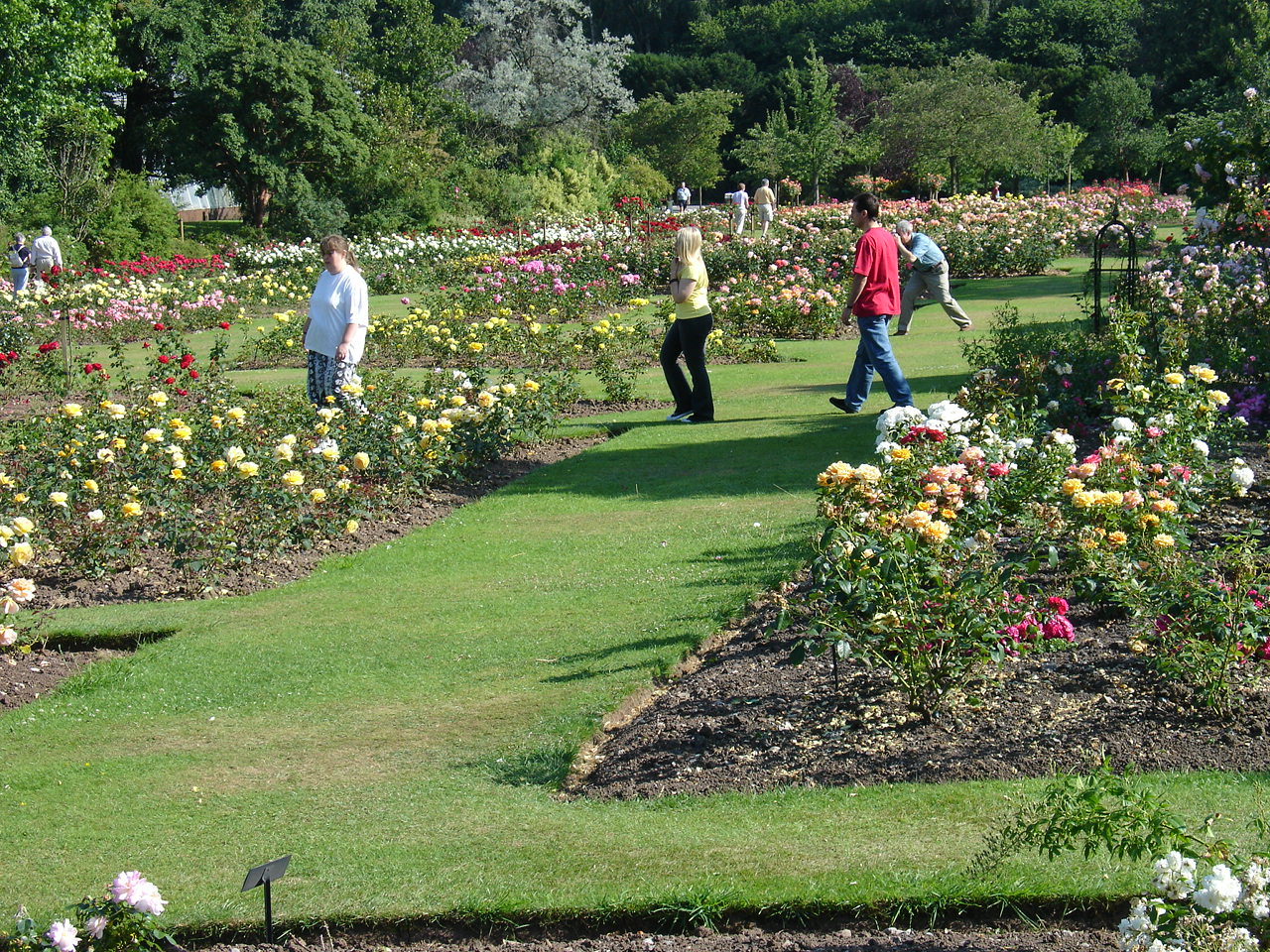
Rose display garden at Roath Park, Cardiff

== History ==
Parc de Bagatelle in Paris hosted the first international competition in 1907. This event, known as the Concours international de roses nouvelles de Bagatelle (International competition for new roses), has taken place annually ever since and remains one of the world's top rose competitions.

A formalised international rose trial scheme was established in 1928 by the Royal National Rose Society (then known as the National Rose Society) in Britain, although the society had been awarding gold medals to the best new roses grown by its membership since 1883.

Over succeeding decades, trial grounds have been established in most major rose growing countries. Often they are located in botanic gardens and parks. Some countries have several trial grounds to assess roses in a variety of climates and soils. The first rose trial ground in the southern hemisphere (where rose seasons and growing conditions may be very different from the northern hemisphere) was established in New Zealand in 1969 as a partnership between the national rose society and Palmerston North city council.

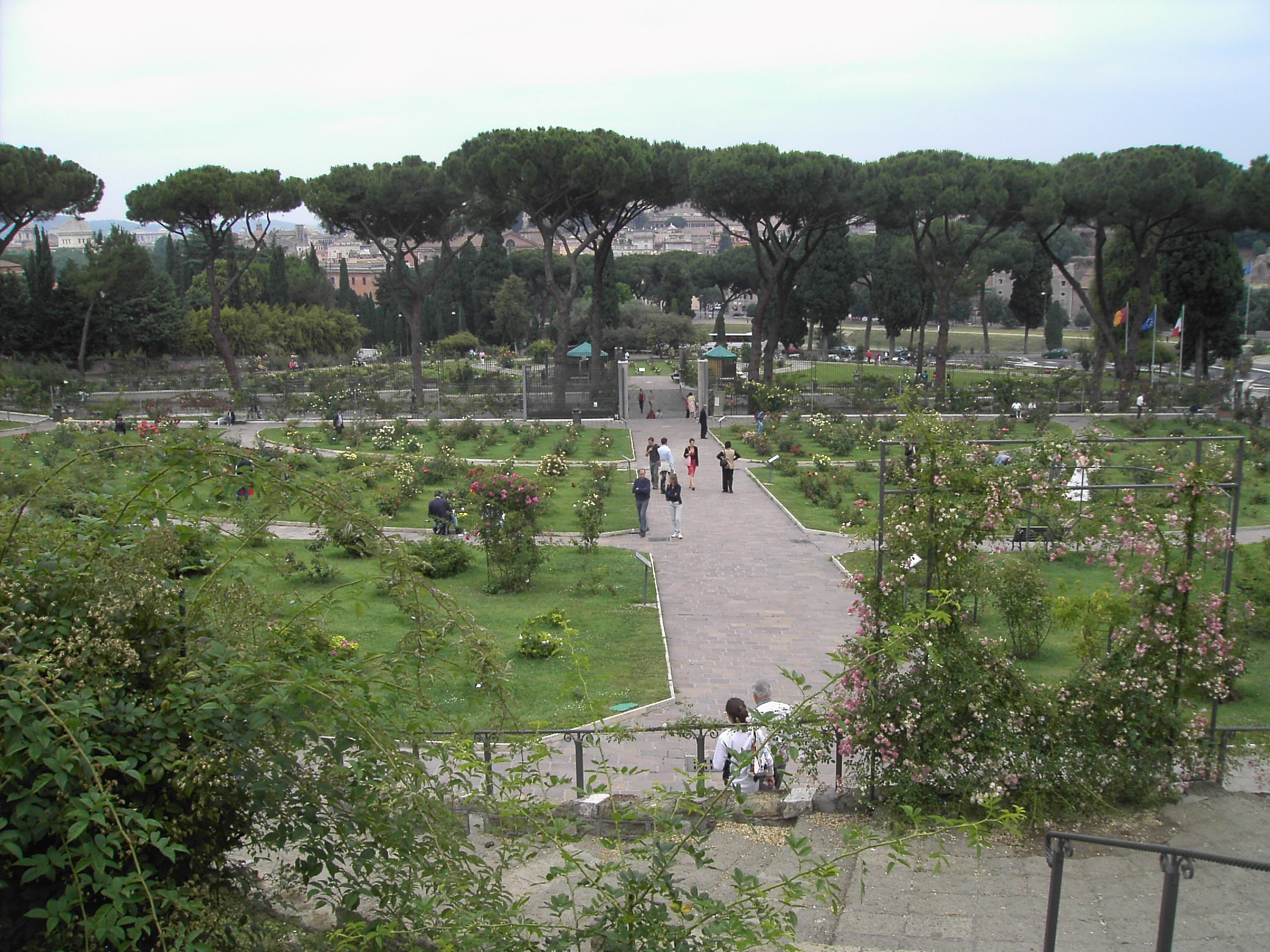
Roseto Comunale in Rome contains rose trial grounds

== Notable trial grounds ==
Rose trial grounds involved with major rose awards include:

- National Rose Trial Garden of Australia, Adelaide Botanic Garden, Australia
- Döblhoffpark Baden bei Wien, Austria
- Rosarium West Vlaanderen Kortrijk, Belgium
- Montreal Botanical Garden, Canada
- Parc de Bagatelle, Paris, France
- Parc de la Tête d'Or, Lyon, France
- Beutigpark, Baden-Baden, Germany
- Roseto Comunale, Rome, Italy
- Il Roseto Niso Fumagalli, Monza, Italy
- Jindai Shokubutsu Botanical Garden, Tokyo, Japan
- Westbroekpark, The Hague, Netherlands
- National Trial Ground, Palmerston North, New Zealand
- Hamilton Gardens, Hamilton, New Zealand
- Sir Thomas and Lady Dixon Park, Belfast, Northern Ireland
- Tollcross Park, Glasgow, Scotland
- Rosaleda de Madrid, Parque del Oeste, Madrid, Spain
- Parc de la Grange, Geneva, Switzerland
- Royal National Gardens of the Rose, St Albans, UK
- All-America Rose Selections Garden, Alexandria, Virginia, US
- American Rose Center International Rose Trial Garden, Shreveport, Louisiana, US
- International Rose Test Garden, Portland, Oregon, US
- Roath Park, Cardiff (Rose of the Year display garden), UK

== See also ==
- List of Rosa species
- List of rose cultivars named after people
- Rose garden
- List of Award of Garden Merit roses
- Rose Hall of Fame
- Rose show
- Rose cultivars
