= Marie-Louise Meilland =

French rose hybridizer and business owner (1920–1987)

Marie-Louise (Louisette) Meilland
- Born: Marie-Louise Paolino; 1920; Antibes, France
- Died: March 7, 1987 (aged 66–67); Antibes
- Other names: Louisette Meilland
- Occupations: Rose breeder business owner
- Known for: Hybrid tea, floribunda, and climbing rose varieties
- Spouse: Francis Meilland
- Awards: Portland Gold Award, All-America Rose Selections

Marie-Louise ("Louisette") Paolino Meilland (1920–1987) was a French rose breeder and co-owner of Meilland International in France. She was married to renowned rose breeder, Francis Meilland, who bred the world famous 'Peace' rose in the 1930s. After her husband died in 1958, she took over the family business and continued to breed roses. During her long career, Louisette Meilland bred over 120 rose varieties, and received multiple awards for her work.

== Early years ==
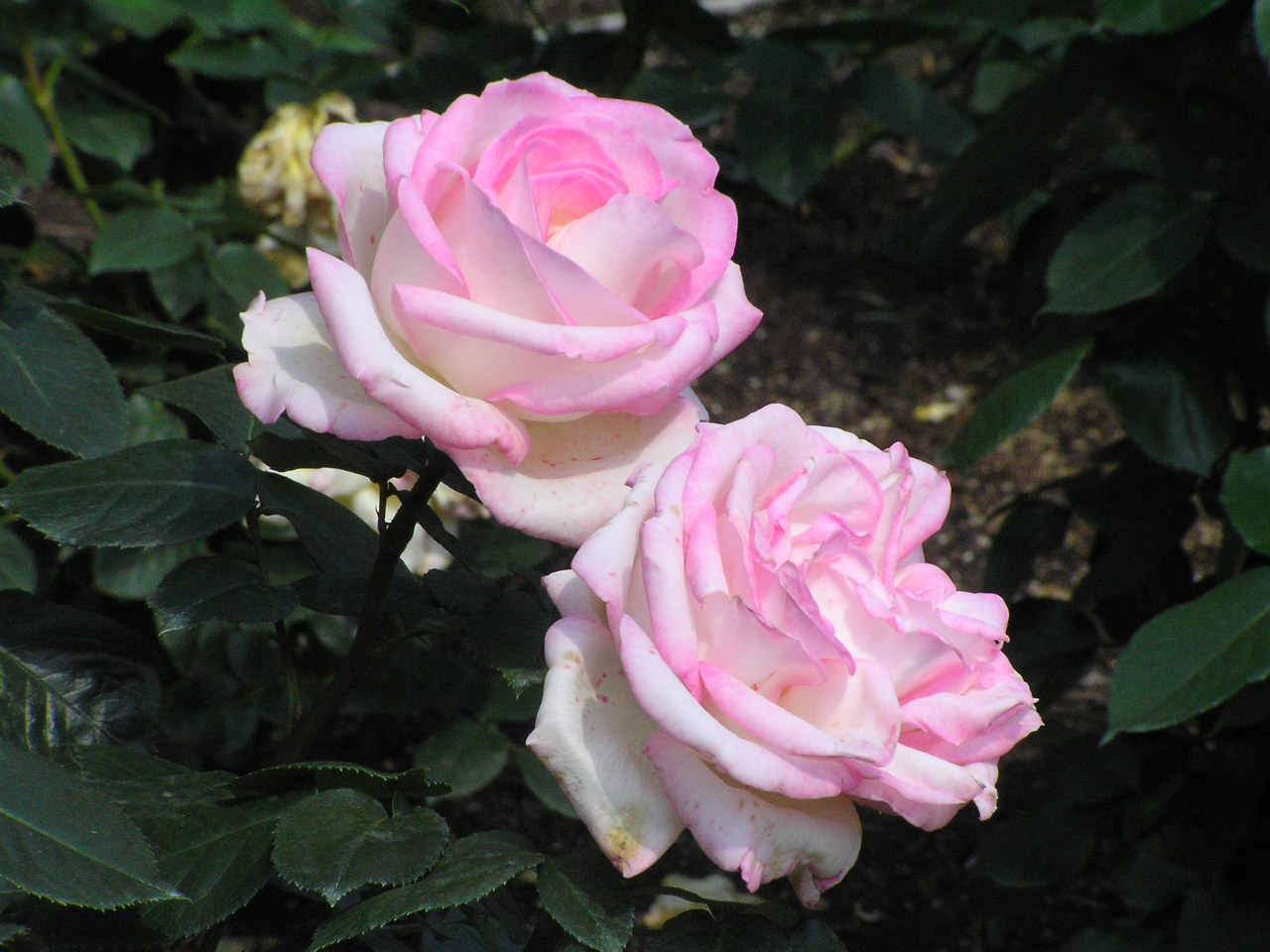
'Princess de Monaco'

Marie-Louise ("Louisette") Meilland, (born Marie-Louise Paolino), was born in Antibes, France in 1920. Her mother Marie Élisabeth Greco was from Grasse. Her father, Francesco Giacomo Paolino, was the son of immigrants, who moved to Antibes from Calabria. Paolino grew greenhouses roses and owned a rose school on the Antibes peninsula. Louisette worked as her father's nursery assistant, and bred her first rose cultivar at the age of fifteen. She met her future husband, Francis Meilland in 1932, at a meeting between her father and Antoine Meilland, Francis's father. Louisette was twelve years old at the time and Francis was twenty. Francis later traveled throughout Europe and across the U.S. to meet with other rose growers, to learn about new innovations and efficiencies in rose growing. While in the U.S., he began a business relationship with Robert Pyle of the Conrad-Pyle Company. Pyle's company introduced Meilland's first commercially successful rose variety, 'Golden State', in the U.S. in 1938.

Louisette and Francis were married on January 14, 1939. They worked together at the Meilland nursery in Tassin-la-Demi-Lune, collaborating on the selection of new rose varieties; Louisette was the administrator for the nursery. That same year, a few months before Germany’s invasion of France, Francis sent cuttings of a new promising rose cultivar to fellow rose growers in Germany, Italy, and Turkey, and also to the Conard-Pyle company in the U.S. Francis named the pink and yellow rose, ‘Madame Antoine Meilland,’ after his late mother, Claudia. The new rose was later introduced in Pasadena, California, on April 29, 1945, the day that Berlin surrendered to Allied forces. Due to the historic occasion, the rose was re-named 'Peace'. The introduction of 'Peace' was an immediate success. The royalties from sales of the 'Peace' rose allowed the Meilland family go into partnership in 1946 with their competitor and friend, rose grower, Francisque Richardier. Their new business was renamed Meilland Richardier.

== Later years ==
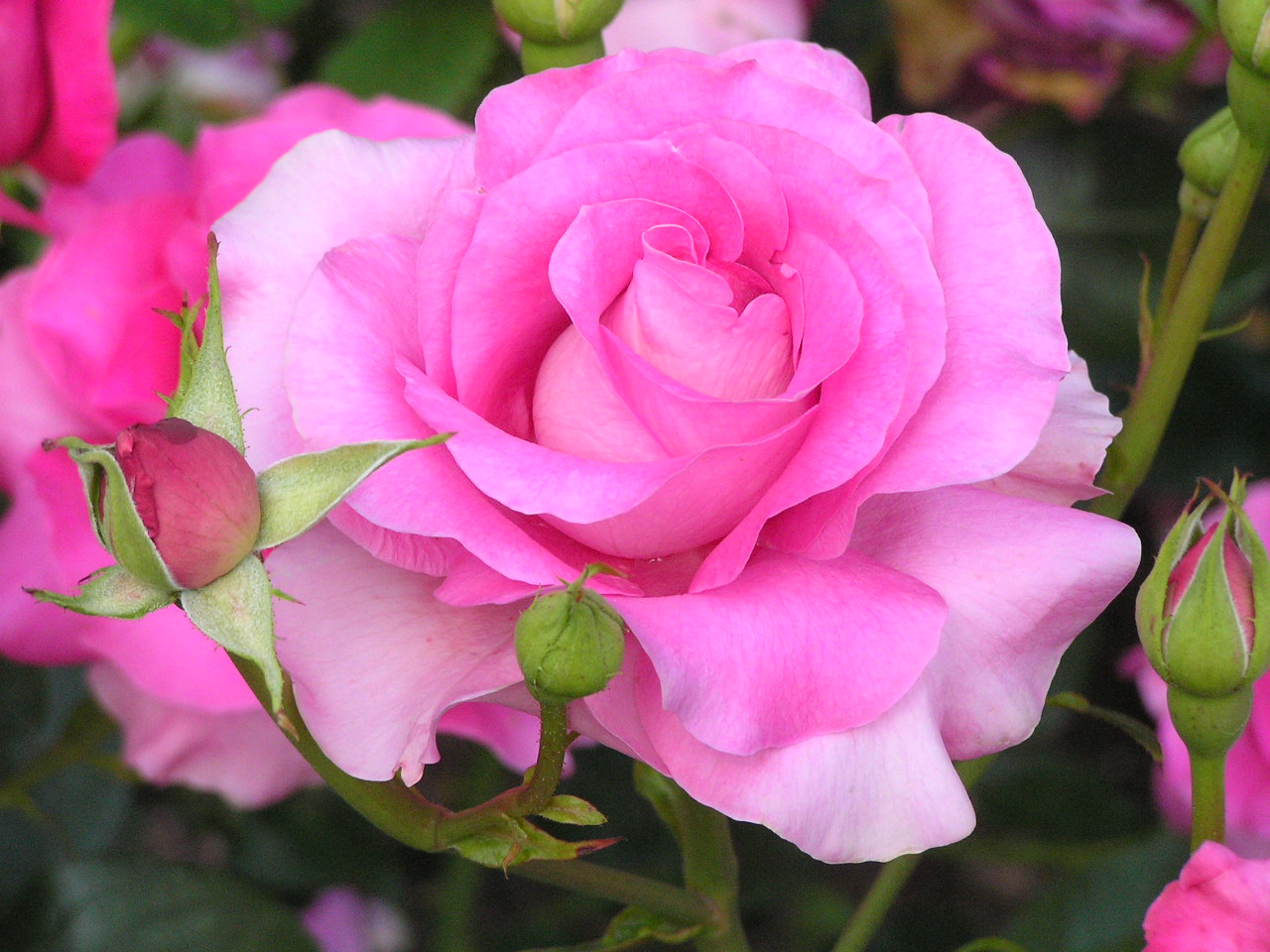
'Manou Meilland'

During the 1950s, Louisette continued to work as an administrator and rose breeder at Meilland Richardier (now a subsidiary of Meilland International). After the early death of Francis, in 1958, she continued to manage the company until her son Alain joined the company when he turned eighteen years old. He was later joined by his sister Michelle. Louisette was primarily interested in developing new Hybrid tea, Floribunda and Climbing rose cultivars. During her decades long career, she introduced 120 new rose varieties, many of her roses have won multiple awards.

Louisette was never interested in having a rose named after herself, and turned down many offers to name new cultivars "Louisette Meilland". Her family persisted, and they later dedicated the 'Manou Meilland' rose variety to their family matriarch. "Manou", is the name she was affectionally called by her grandchildren. Louisette Meilland retired in 1986 and died in Antibes on March 7, 1987, at the age of 66. Her funeral service was held at the Saint Benoît Catholic church in Antibes, where Louisette was also baptized and married. Her son Alain Meilland (born 1940) continues to manage Meilland International, along with his sister, Michèle Meilland Richardier. (born 1943).

== Selected roses ==
- 'Clair Matin', Large-flowered climber(1960)
- 'Maria Callas', Hybrid tea, (1965),
- 'Miss All-American Beauty' Hybrid tea, (1967), (AARS),
- 'Pharaoh', Hybrid tea, (1967)
- 'Baronne Edmond de Rothschild ', Hybrid tea, (1968)
- 'Sonia Meilland', Grandiflora, (1974)
- 'Ambassador', Hybrid tea, (1977)
- 'Fiona', Shrub rose, (1979)
- 'Orange Sunblaze', Miniature rose, (1979)
- 'Princesse de Monaco', Hybrid tea, (1981)
- 'Pink Panther', Hybrid tea, (1981)
- 'Bonica 82', Florubinda, (1981), (AARS)
- 'Alliance', Hybrid tea, (1984)
- 'Louis de Funès', Hybrid tea, (1987)
- 'Debut', Miniature rose, (1987), (AARS)

== Gallery ==
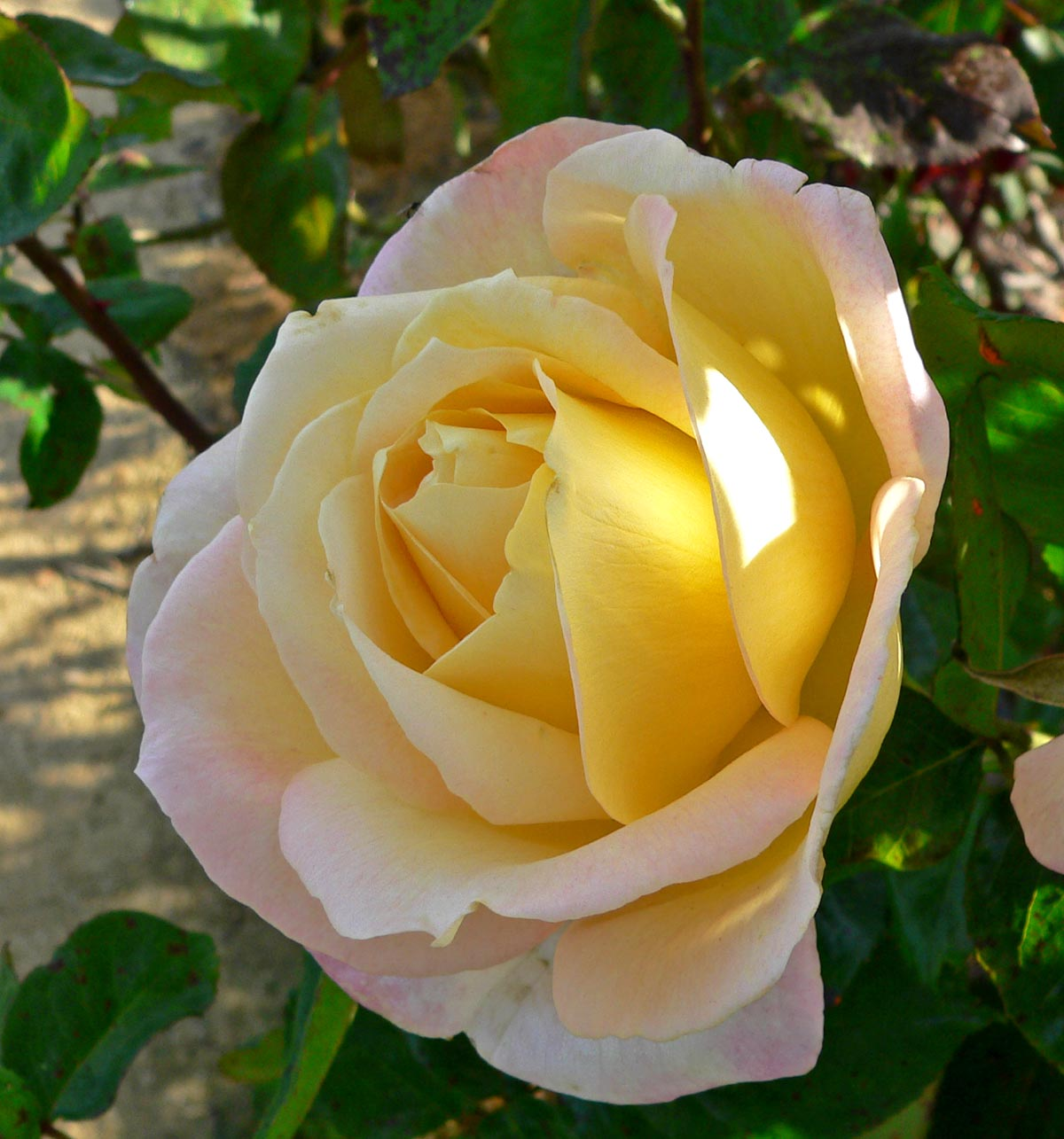
'Grand'mère Jenny', (1950)

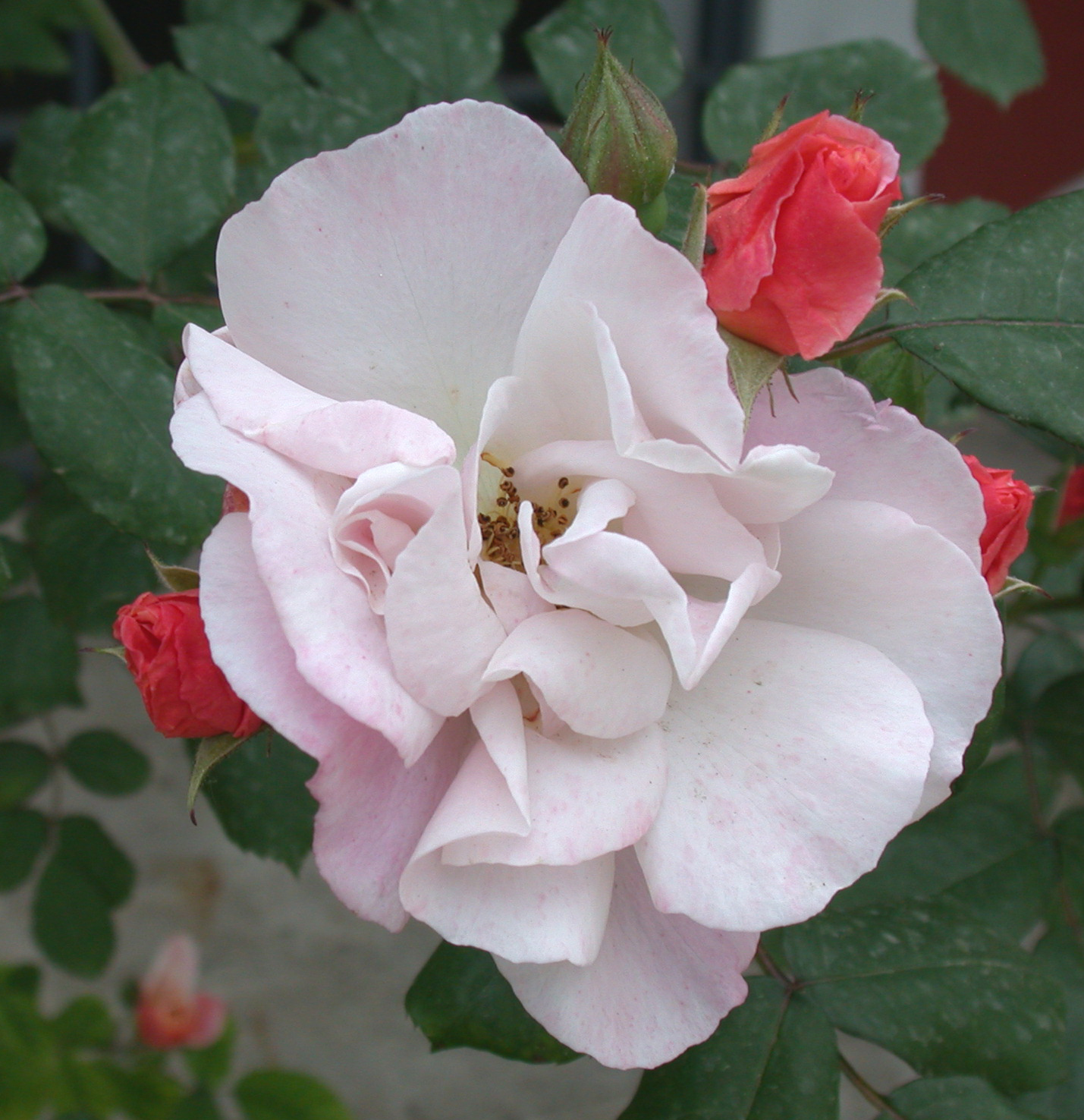
'Claire Matin', (1960)

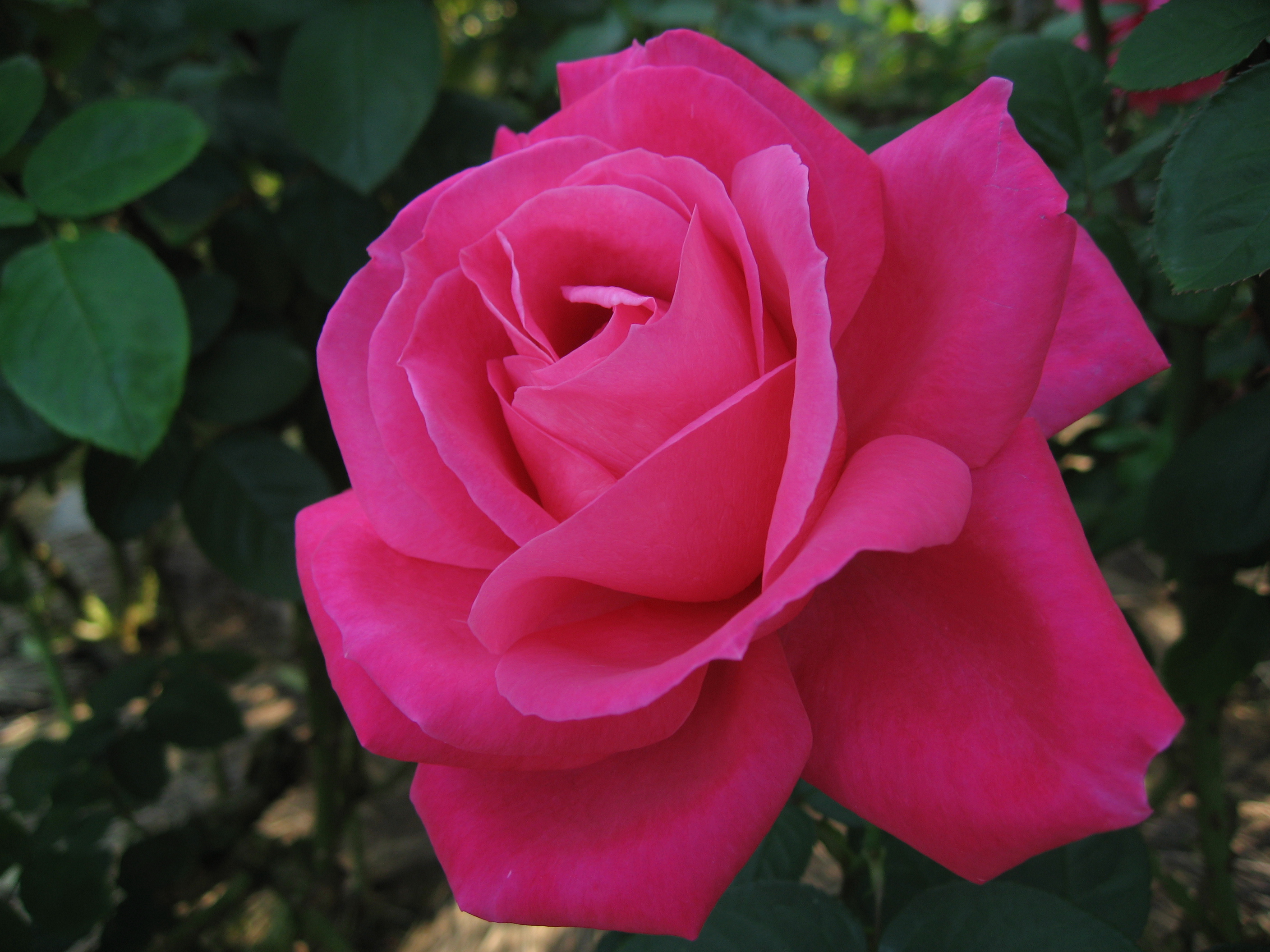
'Maria Callas', (1965)

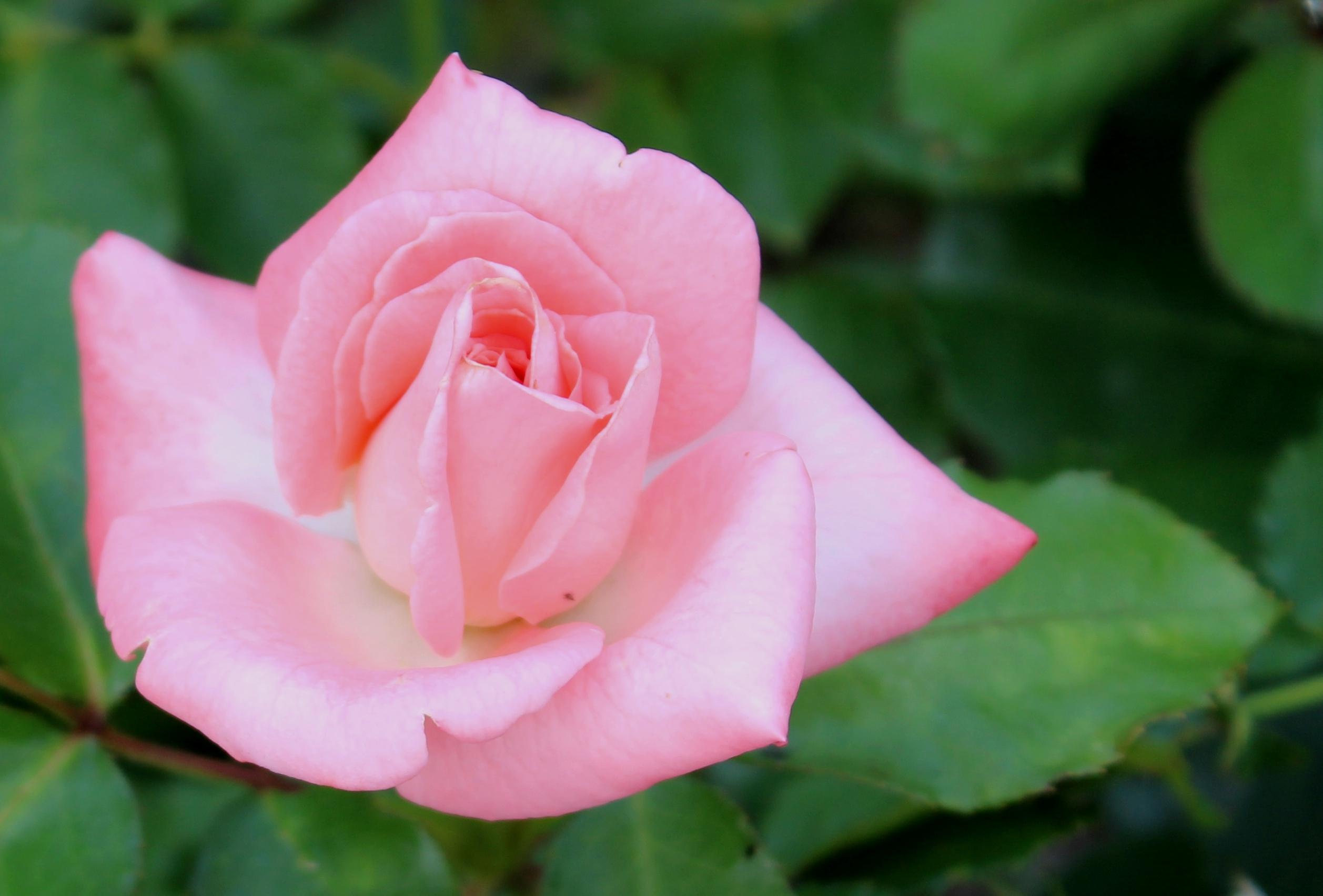
'Sonia Meilland', (1974)

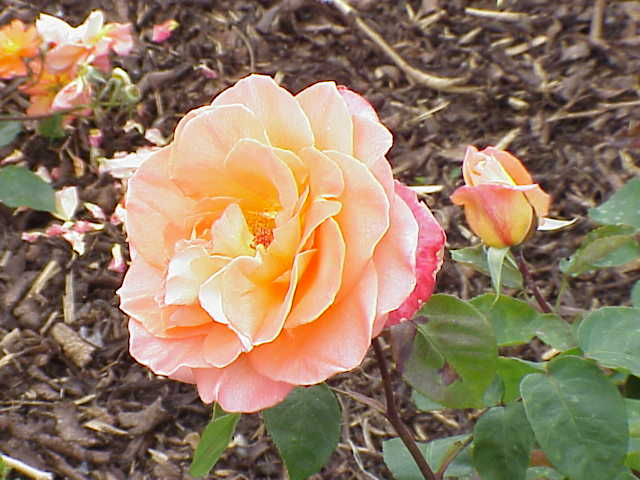
'Ambassador', (1977)

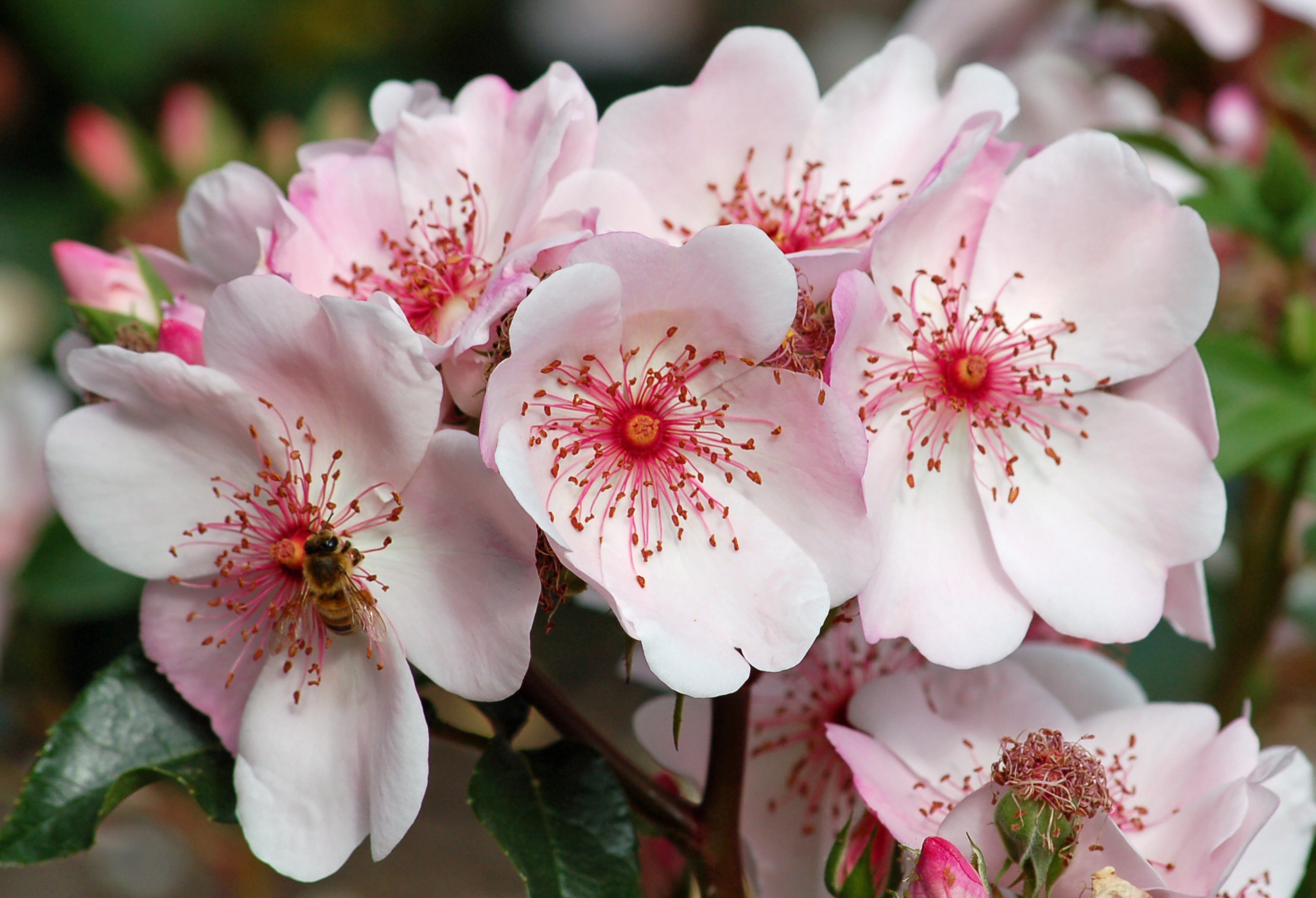
'Astronomia', (2006)

== Sources ==
- Harkness, Jack (1985). The Maker of Heavenly Roses. ISBS. ISBN 978-0285626546.
- Phillips, Roger; Rix, Martin (1993). Quest for the Rose: A Historical Guide to Roses. Random House. ISBN 978-0679435730.
- Quest-Ritson, Brigid; Quest-Ritson, Charles (1993). Encyclopedia of Roses. DK Publishing. ISBN 978-0756688684.
