= Antoine Meilland =

French rosarian and nurseryman (1884–1971)

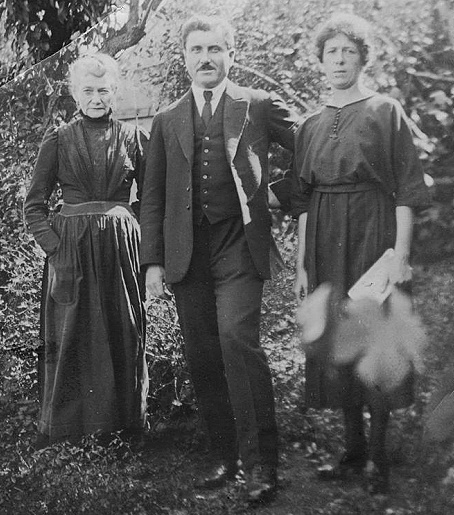
Grand'mere Jenny Meilland, Antoine and Claudia Meilland, c. 1919

Antoine '("Papa") Meilland (1884–1971) was a French rose grower and co-founder of Meilland International, a large rose growing company in southern France. As a young man, he worked as a nursery assistant for rose breeder, Francis Dubreuil. Antoine married, Dubreuil's daughter, Claudia in 1909 and their son Francis, was born in 1912. Antoine was drafted into the French army when France entered the War in 1914, and Claudia managed the nursery in his absence. Dubreuil died in 1916. When Antoine returned to Lyon, after the war, he and Claudia took over the management of the family business.

In 1919, with the goal of expanding their nursery business, Antoine and Claudia moved to Tassin-la-Demi-Lune. Their son, Francis, followed his parents into the rose business. He was a talented and prolific rose breeder, and is best remembered for developing the legendary 'Peace' rose in 1939. The new rose variety was introduced in 1945 and was a tremendous commercial success. In 1946, the Meilland family sold a majority of their business to rosarian and business owner, Francisque Richardier, so that Francis could devote himself solely to breeding roses. The new company became the Meilland-Richardier company, which is now a subsidiary of Mielland International.

== Biography ==
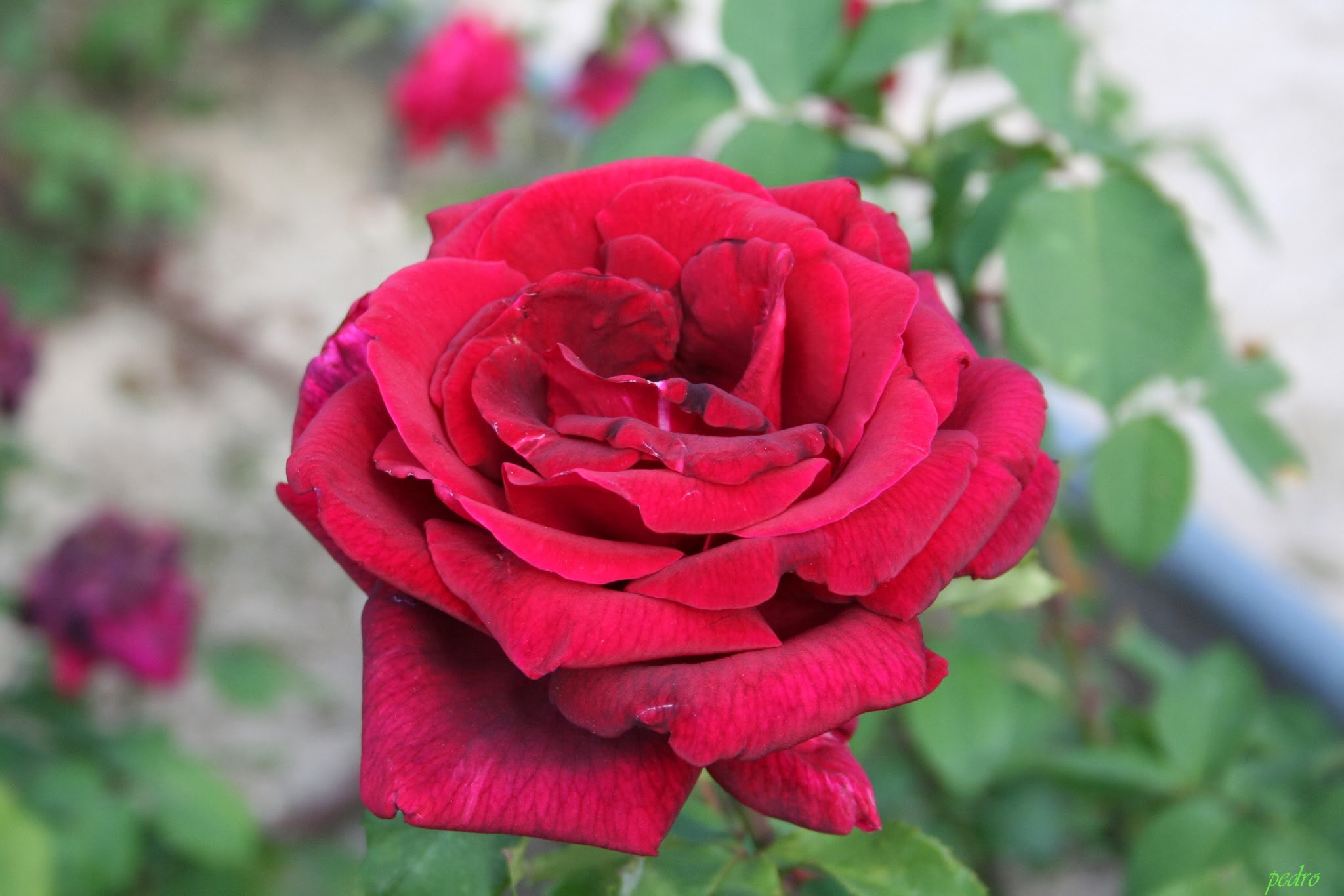
'Papa Meilland', 1963

=== 1884 to 1919 ===
Antoine Meilland was born in 1884 on a small farm in Chamboeuf, France. He was the youngest of four children. A neighbor, Madame Meviere, introduced Antoine to his first rose, Rosa 'Noisettiana' (1814), which had just started blooming in her garden. From that moment on, Antoine dedicated himself to learning as much as he could about the cultivation of roses. He borrowed Madame Meviere's rose catalogues of Francis Debreuil and she taught him how to bud roses. By the age of twelve, he decided that he wanted to grow roses, so he quit school and took a job at a local arborist where he learned grafting techniques. He worked as a nursery worker until he was sixteen, when he was then hired as a gardener's assistant at Francis Debreuil's nursery. There, he fell in love with Debreuil's daughter, Claudia, also a gardening assistant, and they married in 1909. Their son, Francis (Francois), named after his grandfather Dubreuil, was born in 1912.

Antoine was inducted in the French army when France entered the War in 1914. Claudia was left to manage the family farm on her own. She transitioned from growing roses to growing vegetables to support her family during the war. Antoine returned to Lyon in 1919. With the goal of expanding their rose growing business, the Meillands moved to Tassin-la-Demi-Lune near Lyon, where the soil was better for rose growing. Antoine and Claudia bought 1.5 hectares (3.7 acres) of land and a house. He planted twenty thousand rootstocks, and lost the entire crop to an invasion of root eating maybugs

=== 1919 to 1971 ===
Francis Meilland followed in his family's footsteps, and started working at the nursery from the age of fourteen. He attended meetings with Antoine and other rose breeders and learned how to cultivate roses from his father. Francis's first attempts to breed roses were not successful. His father took Francis along to a meeting of rose hybridizers hosted by prominent rosarian, Charles Mallerin. Mallerin became a mentor to Francis and encouraged his efforts in rose breeding. Mallerin introduced the Meillands to the American businessman, Robert Pyle of the Conrad Pyle Company. Pyle signed a marketing contract with the Meilland family, allowing him to introduce Meilland roses in the United States. As the Meilland's representative, Conrad-Pyle introduced Francis's first commercially successful rose in the U.S., 'Golden State', in 1938.

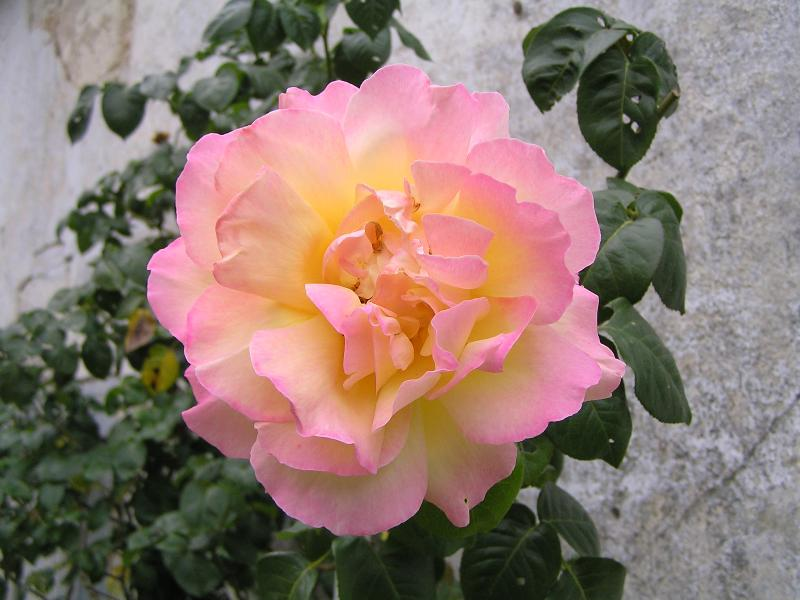
'Peace', 1945

In 1939, just months before Germany's invasion of France, Francis sent cuttings of a promising rose cultivar to fellow rose growers in Germany, Italy, and Turkey, and also to the Conard-Pyle company in the U.S. Francis named the pink and yellow blend rose, ‘Madame Antoine Meilland,’ after his late mother, Claudia, who had died in 1932. In the U.S., the new rose was successfully propagated. It was later introduced on April 29, 1945, on the same day that Berlin surrendered to Allied forces. The rose was given the marketing name, 'Peace', in the U.S., to mark the end of the war. It was an immediate commercial success and sold extremely well worldwide.

The profits from sales of 'Peace' allowed the Meillands to sell half of their business to their friend and rose grower, Francisque Richardier in 1946, so that Francis could focus solely on breeding roses. Their new business was renamed Meilland-Richardier, and is now a subsidiary of Meilland International in southern France. Francois died in 1958, from cancer, at the age of 46. Antoine Meilland died on February 9, 1971. Francis's wife, Louisette, took over the management of the company, after Francis's death, and continued breeding roses. She introduced 120 new rose varieties during her career. Her children, Alain and Michelle, later took over management of the company. Alain Meilland developed a dark red Hybrid tea rose, 'Papa Meilland in 1963, which he named in honor of his grandfather.

== Sources ==
- Harkness, Jack (1985). The Maker of Heavenly Roses. ISBS. ISBN 978-0285626546.
- Phillips, Roger; Rix, Martin (1993). Quest for the Rose: A Historical Guide to Roses. Random House. ISBN 978-0679435730.
- Quest-Ritson, Brigid; Quest-Ritson, Charles (1993). Encyclopedia of Roses. DK Publishing. ISBN 978-0756688684.
