= Hôtel de Ville, Tassin-la-Demi-Lune =

Town hall in Tassin-la-Demi-Lune, France

Hôtel de Ville
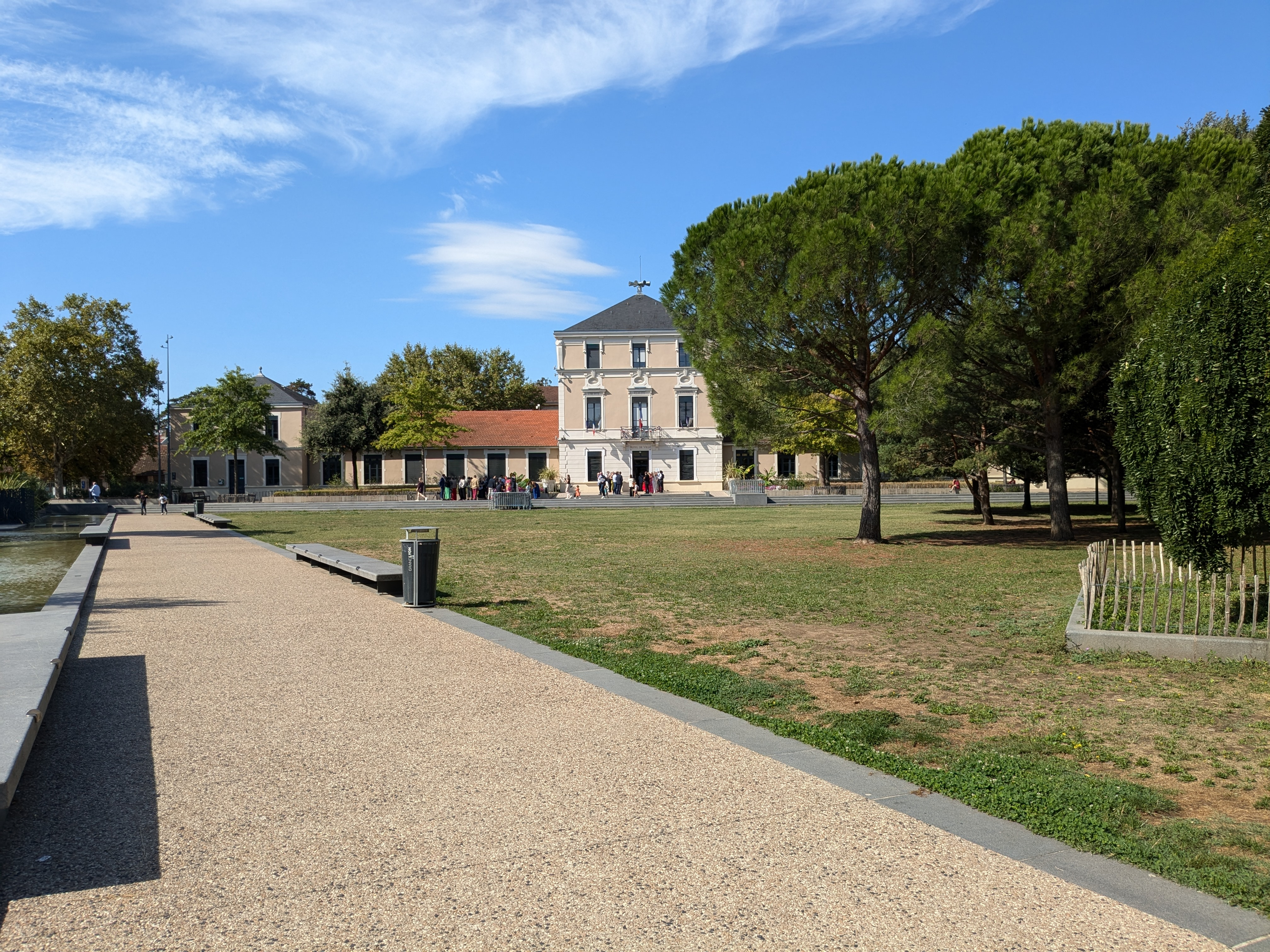
- The main frontage of the Hôtel de Ville in September 2024
- Interactive map of the Hôtel de Ville area

General information
- Type: City hall
- Architectural style: Neoclassical style
- Location: Tassin-la-Demi-Lune, France
- Coordinates: 45.7613°N 4.7772°E
- Completed: 1886

Design and construction
- Architect: Sieur Curieux

The Hôtel de Ville (French pronunciation: [otɛl də vil], City Hall) is a municipal building in Tassin-la-Demi-Lune, Metropolis of Lyon, in eastern France, standing on Place Hippolyte Péragut.

== History ==
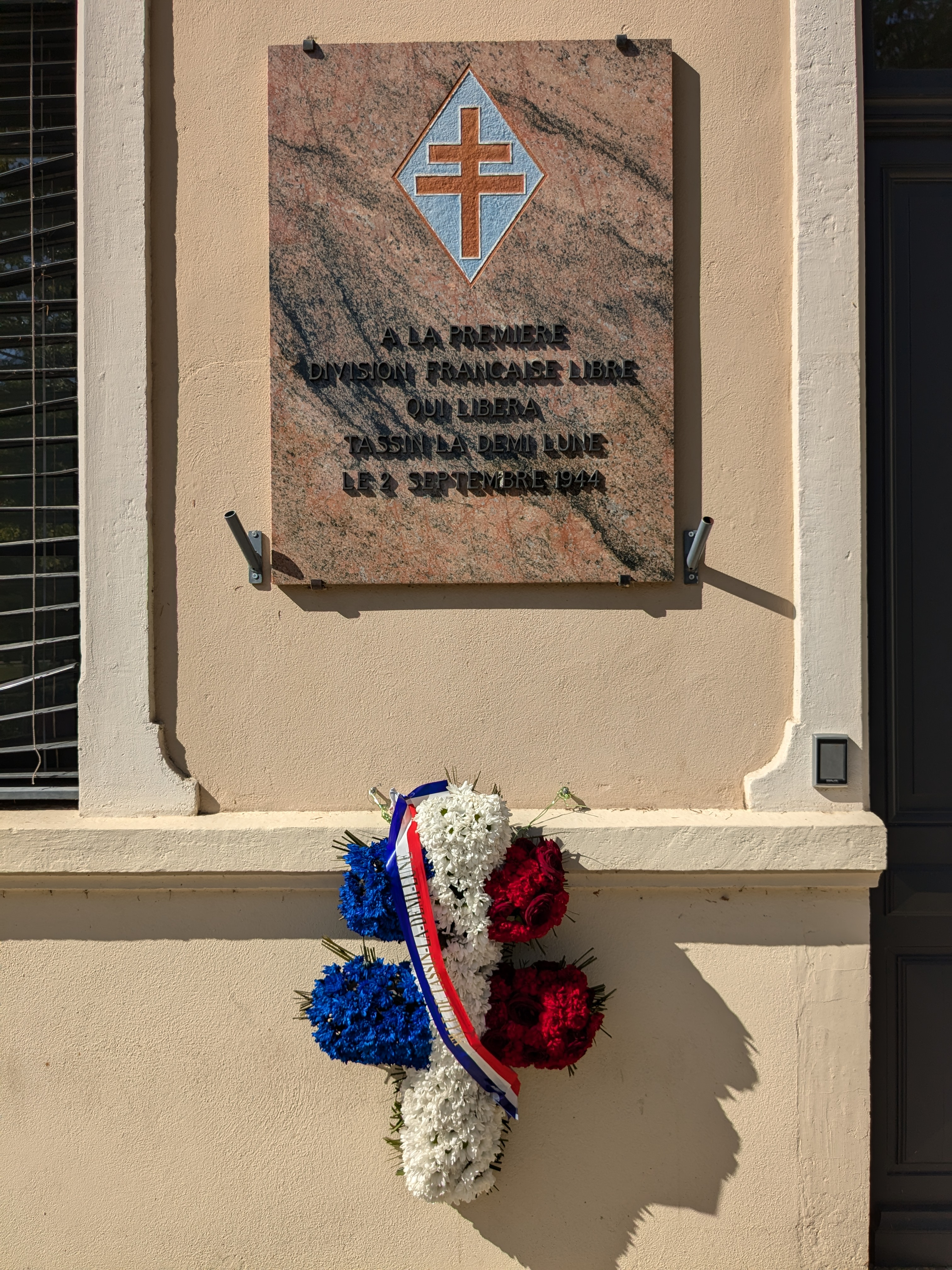
Plaque on the front of the town hall

After the village of Tassin annexed the town of La Demi-Lune to create the commune of Tassin-la-Demi-Lune in January 1881, the new council led by the mayor, Colas le Blanc, decided to commission a combined town hall and school. The site they selected was on the corner of two streets (now Avenue Général Leclerc and Avenue Charles de Gaulle). The new building was designed by Sieur Curieux in the neoclassical style, built in brick with stone dressings and was completed in 1886.

The complex was laid out as a three-storey main block with a pair of two-storey pavilions which were connected to the main block by long single-storey sections. The pavilions accommodated the schools, one for boys and the other for girls. The design of the main block involved a symmetrical main frontage of three bays facing onto a new garden, initially known as Place de la Mairie. The central bay featured a square headed doorway on the ground floor, a French door surmounted by a lozenge-shaped sculpture and fronted by an iron balcony on the first floor, and a casement window flanked by pilasters on the second floor. The outer bays were fenestrated in a similar style and, at roof level, there was an entablature and a modillioned cornice. Internally, the principal room was the Salle du Conseil (council chamber).

In 1933, the council renamed the garden Place Hippolyte Péragut, after a politician, Hippolyte Péragut, who had served as mayor for two decades in the early part of the 20th century. He became the national leader of a non-partisan association of mayors. After the Second World War, a plaque was placed on the front of the town hall to commemorate the lives of the troops of the 1st Free French Division, commanded by General Diego Brosset, who liberated the town from German occupation on 2 September 1944.

In 2011, the main block was refurbished, and, in 2013, it was extended to the rear by the creation of a square-shaped structure behind the main block. The extension, which was carried out to a design by Mimêsis Architecture, featured light-coloured timber window frames and dark cladding. The complex was further enhanced when, in 2016, the Maison Cornut, behind the town hall, was refurbished and converted into a family centre.
