= Rosa 'Princesse de Monaco' =

Rose cultivar

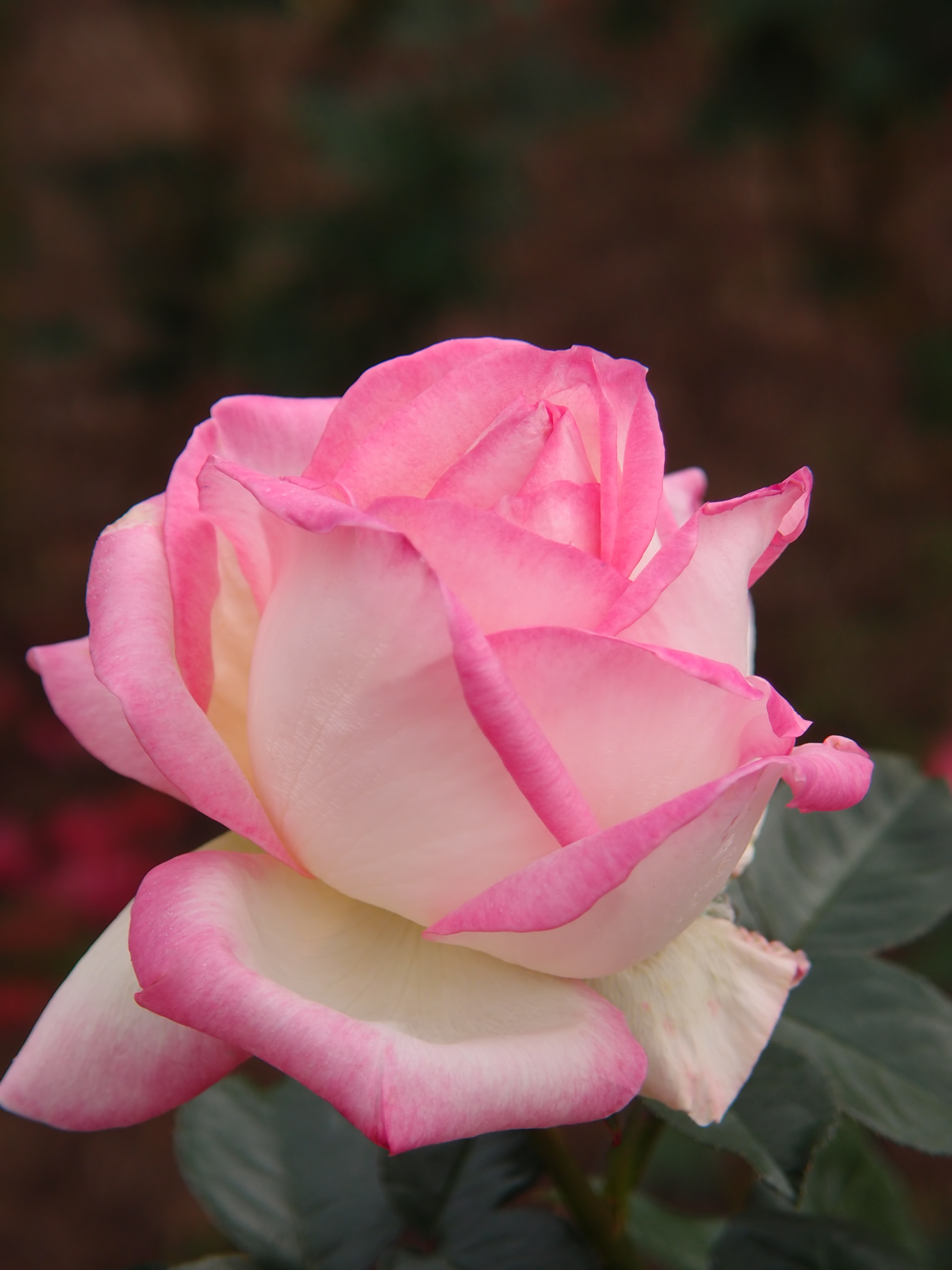
- Hybrid parentage: Rosa 'Ambassador' × Rosa 'Peace'
- Cultivar group: Hybrid Tea
- Marketing names: 'Princesse de Monaco', 'Princess of Monaco', 'Princess de Monaco'
- Breeder: Marie-Louise Meilland
- Origin: France, 1981

Rosa 'Princesse de Monaco' (a.k.a. 'Princess of Monaco') is a blend hybrid tea rose cultivar bred in France by Marie-Louise Meilland and introduced in 1981. It is dedicated to Princess Grace of Monaco (1929–1982), who was president of Salon de la Rose's Jury in Monaco in 1981. Its parents were two hybrid tea cultivars, 'Ambassador' (Meilland, 1977) x Peace (Meilland, 1935).

== Description ==
Its bush is reaching 80 cm in height (sometimes much more in a favorable situation) with dense, dark green foliage. It shows from June to October large roses (13–14 cm) of undeniable elegance and remarkable delicacy. They are creamy white with wavy petals gently edged with pink carmine. Flowers on long stems are ideal for cut flowers. They perfectly illuminate the flowerbeds of gardens.

This rose needs a sunny exposure and is resistant to -20 °.

There has been a climbing variety of 'Princess of Monaco' since 2014.
