= Rosa 'Papa Meilland' =

Rose cultivar

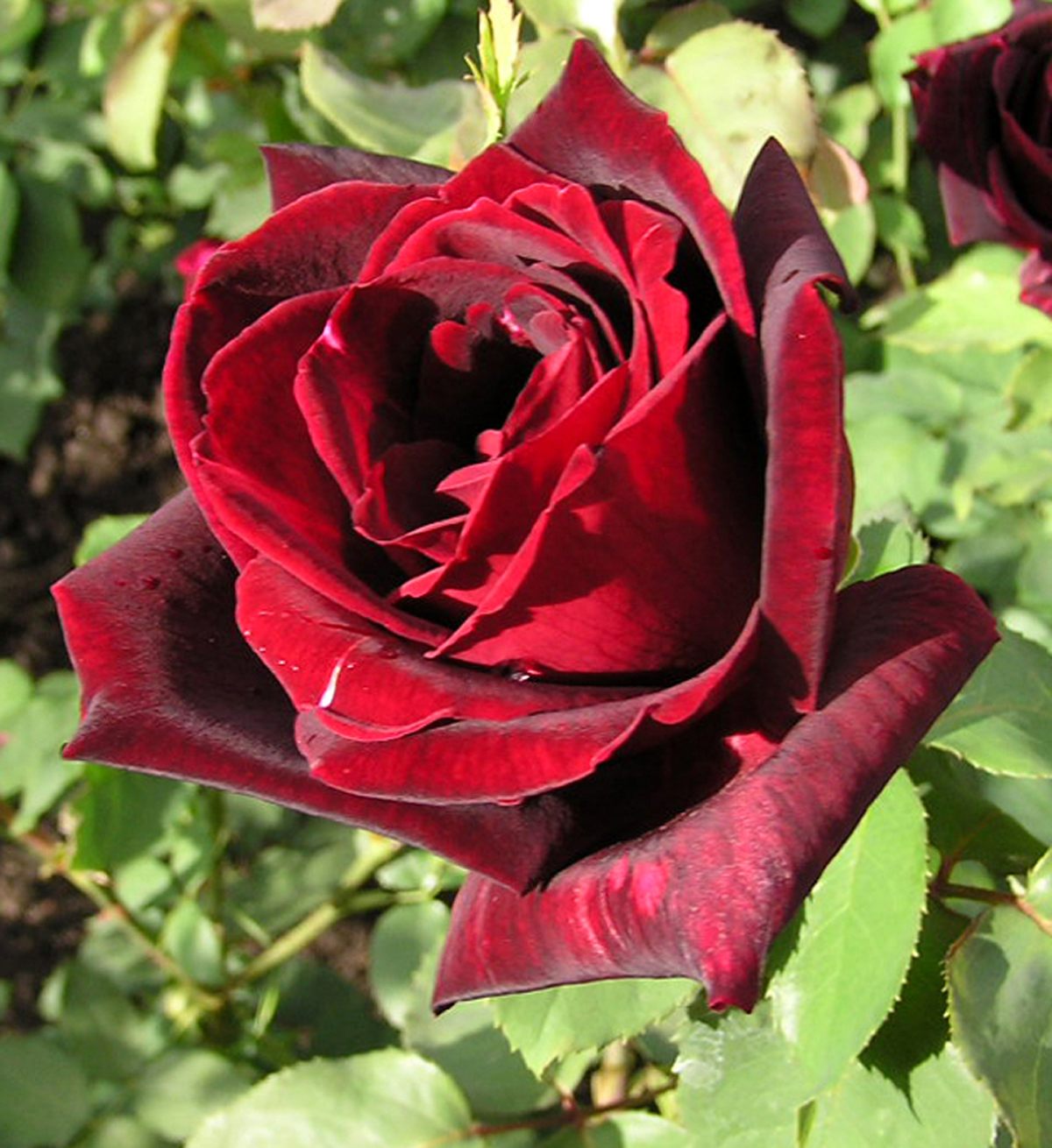
- Genus: Rosa
- Hybrid parentage: 'Chrysler Imperial' and 'Charles Mallerin'
- Cultivar group: Hybrid tea
- Cultivar: 'Papa Meilland'
- Origin: Alain Meilland, 1963

Rosa 'Papa Meilland' is a cultivar of hybrid tea rose, bred by Alain Meilland in France in 1963.

== Description ==
Flowers of dark velvety crimson open from pointed, almost black, buds. The blossoms are large and high-centered, with 35 petals, and are borne mostly singly on strong stems. They have a rich scent. Flowering is very sustained over the summer to early autumn.

The foliage is glossy and bright green.

It is a vigorous rose, but not as disease-resistant as it once was.

In the bush form it is 80 to 90 cm (31 to 35 in) high, and it also exists in climbing form (developed by the nursery rosarian Louis Dima in Doué-la-Fontaine, the French capital of roses ).

== Ancestry ==
This cultivar is the result of the breeding 'Chrysler Imperial' x 'Charles Mallerin', both highly scented, velvety, rich-red roses.

It was the first cultivar of roses officially registered in France, under the name of "Meicesar". Alain Meilland named the rose in honor of his grandfather, rosarian, Antoine Meilland.

== Distinctions ==
- Rose Hall of Fame, 1988,
- Gold medal in Baden-Baden, 1962.
