= Rosa 'Bonica 82' =

Pink shrub rose cultivar

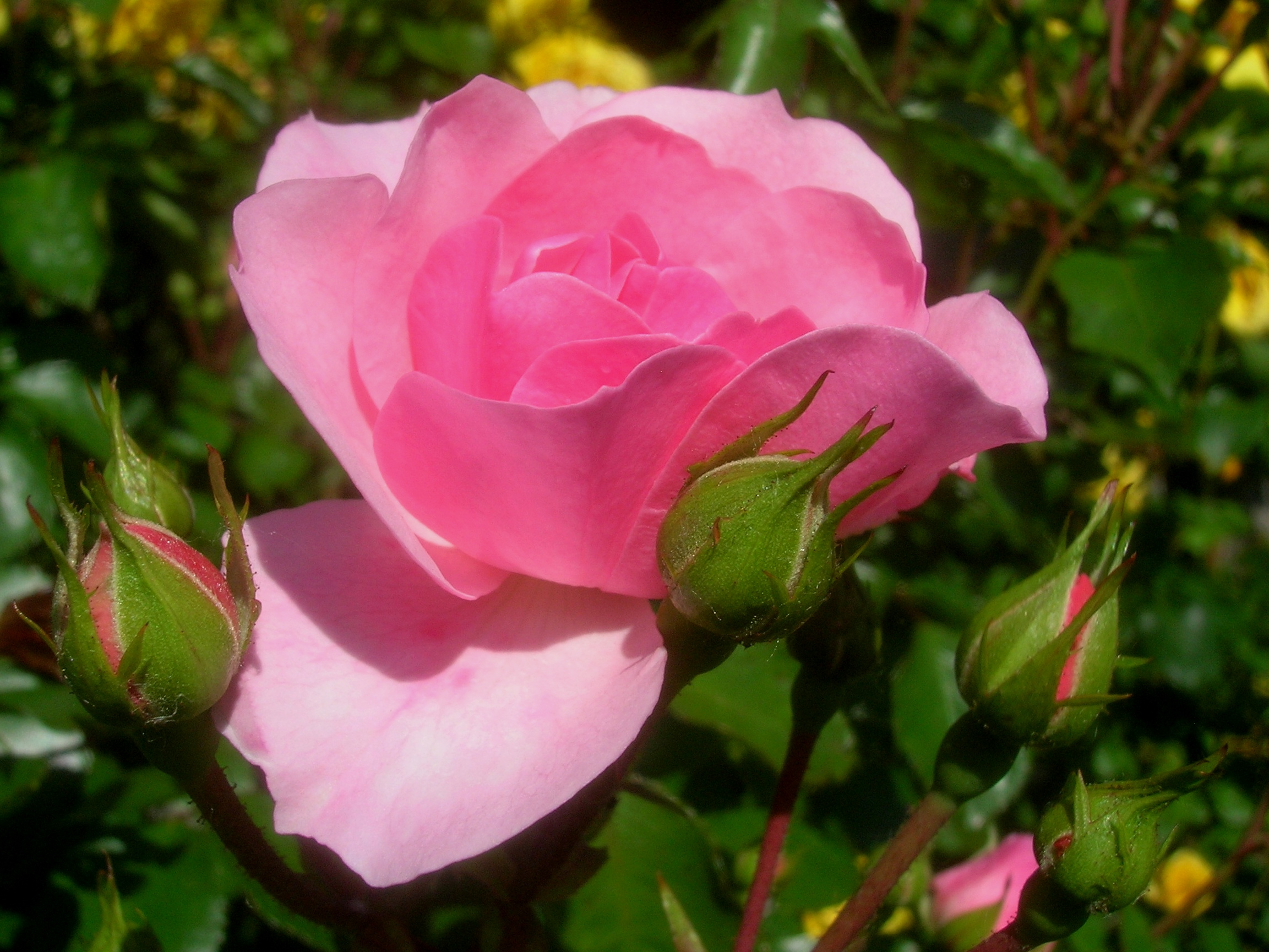
- Rosa 'Bonica 82'
- Genus: Rosa hybrid
- Hybrid parentage: ('semipervirens' x 'Mlle. Marthe Carron') x 'Picasso'
- Cultivar group: Shrub rose
- Cultivar: MEIdomonac
- Marketing names: 'Bonica', 'Bonica 82', 'Bonica Meidiland'
- Breeder: Meilland
- Origin: France, 1982

Rosa 'Bonica 82', (aka MEIdomonac), is a shrub rose cultivar, bred by Marie-Louise Meilland in France in 1982. The cultivar was named an All-America Rose Selections winner in 1987.

== Description ==
'Bonica 82' is a medium bushy shrub, 3 to 5 ft (90—150 cm) in height with a 4—6 ft (121—182 cm) spread. Blooms have an average diameter of 2—3 in (5—7.5 cm) with a petal count of 26 to 40. The plant is excellent for use in the garden, in containers, cut flower, hedge or landscape.

Buds are a rich, dark pink color. Flowers are bright, pale pink when they first open, and later fade to near white in warmer climates. Flowers come in clusters of five to fifteen, and have a mild, sweet fragrance, with ruffled, slightly cupped petals. Flowers have a long bloom time, often producing flowers into late October. The plant produces bright red rose hips that last until the following spring. The leaves are an attractive, semi-glossy, dark green. The plant is very disease resistant and a repeat bloomer. It thrives in USDA zone 4b through 9b.

"'Bonica 82' is one of the most successful and widely planted of all modern roses. It owes its popularity partly to its remarkable vigor and floriferousnous, and partly to its suitability for so many purposes. It is equally useful and easy to grow as a shrub rose, groundcover rose, landscaping plant, and container rose"

— Quest-Ritson, 2011.

== Child plants ==
- Rosa 'Abrud'
- Rosa 'Carte Blanche'
- Rosa 'Ines Sastre'
- Rosa 'Magic Meidiland'
- Rosa 'Mathilda'
- Rosa 'Mon Jardin et Ma Maison'
- Rosa 'Pirouette'
- Rosa 'Red Leonardo da Vinci'
- Rosa 'Rockin' Robin'
- Rosa 'Royal Bonica'
- Rosa 'Tequila'
- Rosa 'The Charlatan'

== Awards ==
- ADR rose winner, (1983)
- All-America Rose Selections winner, USA, (1987)

== See also ==
- Garden roses
- Rose Hall of Fame
- List of Award of Garden Merit roses
