= Francis Dubreuil =

French rose breeder (1842–1916)

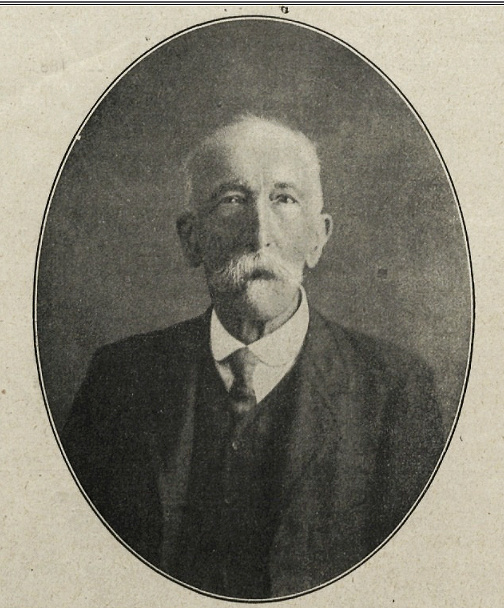
- Francis Dubreuil
- Born: November 2, 1842; Lyon, France
- Died: September 1, 1916 (aged 73)
- Occupation: Rose grower
- Years active: 1184–1914

Francis Dubreuil (1842–1916) was a French rose breeder and nursery owner from Lyon, France. He was the second generation of the Meilland family to breed and grow roses. He introduced over 64 rose varieties during his career and was the founding member of the French Society of rose growers.

== Biography ==
Louis-François ("Francis") Dubreuil was born November 2, 1842, in Lyon, France. He worked as a tailor and was married to Marie Rambaux, daughter of Joseph Rambaux, a gardener and part-time rose breeder. When Rambaux died in 1878, he left his rose business to his wife, Claudine, his daughter Marie and son-in-law, Dubreuil. In 1880, Dubreuil gave up his tailoring profession to take over the management of the Rambaux nursery. He and Claudine introduced the eight rose varieties that Rambaux had developed before his death, including Polyanthas, 'Anna Marie de Montravel' (1880) and 'Perle d'Or' (1883). Dubreuil also started to breed roses on his own.

From 1880 to 1914, Dubreuil introduced 64 rose varieties, expanded the number of roses grown at the nursery and printed the nursery's first annual catalog. When he introduced 'Perle d'Or' in 1883, the perfectly formed, apricot Polyantha brought international attention to the small family nursery. In 1896, and with a growing business, Dubreuil hired a local nursery worker, Antoine Meilland, to be his garden assistant. At the nursery, working alongside Dubreuil, was his daughter, Claudia. The young couple fell in love and married in 1909. In 1912, Claudia gave birth to Dubreuil's first grandson and namesake, Francis, who would later become the Meilland family's most famous family member, when he introduced the 'Peace' rose to the world. After Dubreuil's death on Sept 1, 1916, Antoine and Claudia took over management of the nursery. Dubreuil's most successful rose cultivars include the China rose, 'Jean Bach-Sisley' (1891), Hybrid tea rose, 'Francis Dubreuil' (1897), Noisette, 'Crépuscule' (1904), and, Polyantha 'Mme Francisque Favre' (1915). During his career, he established the French Society of rose growers and was an "officier du Mérite agricole" (Order of Agricultural Merit).

== Selected roses ==
- 'Marquise de Vivens', Tea rose, (1885)
- 'Attraction', Hybrid tea rose, (1886)
- 'Duchesse de Bragance', Tea rose, (1886)
- 'Princesse de Sagan', Tea rose, (1887)
- 'Louis Lille', Hybrid Perpetual, (1887)
- 'Francis Dubreuil', Tea rose, (1894)
- 'Baronne C. de Rochetaillée', Tea rose, (1900)
- 'Duchesse de Bragance', Tea rose, (1886)
- 'Jean Bach-Sisley', China, (1898)
- 'Perle des Neiges', Multiflora, (1902)
- 'Cyclops' Polyantha, (1909)
- 'Bocca Negra', Hybrid Multiflora, (1909)
- 'Petite Marcelle', Polyantha, (1910)
- 'Pompon de Lyon', Polyantha, (1912)

== Gallery ==
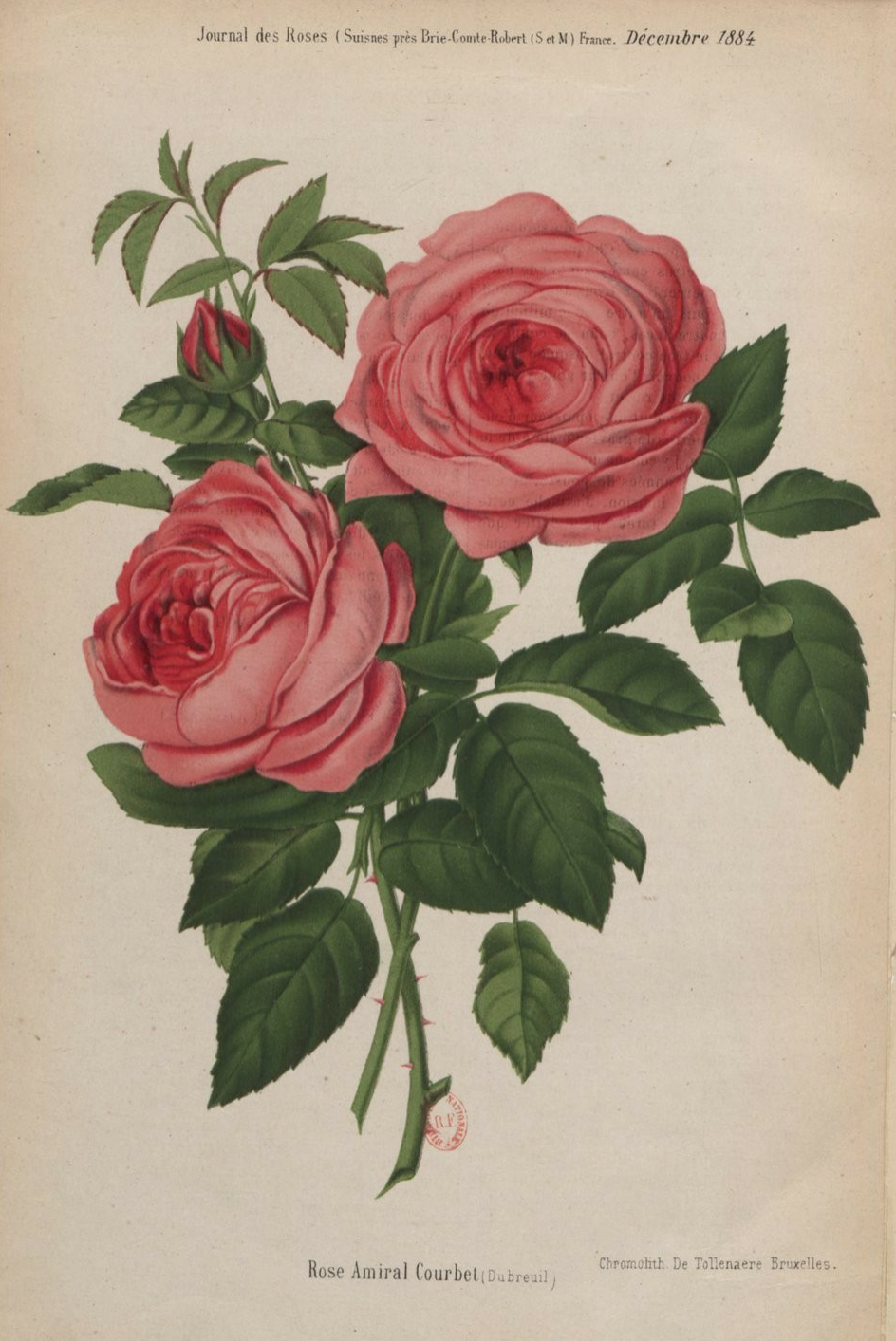
'Amiral courbet', (1884)

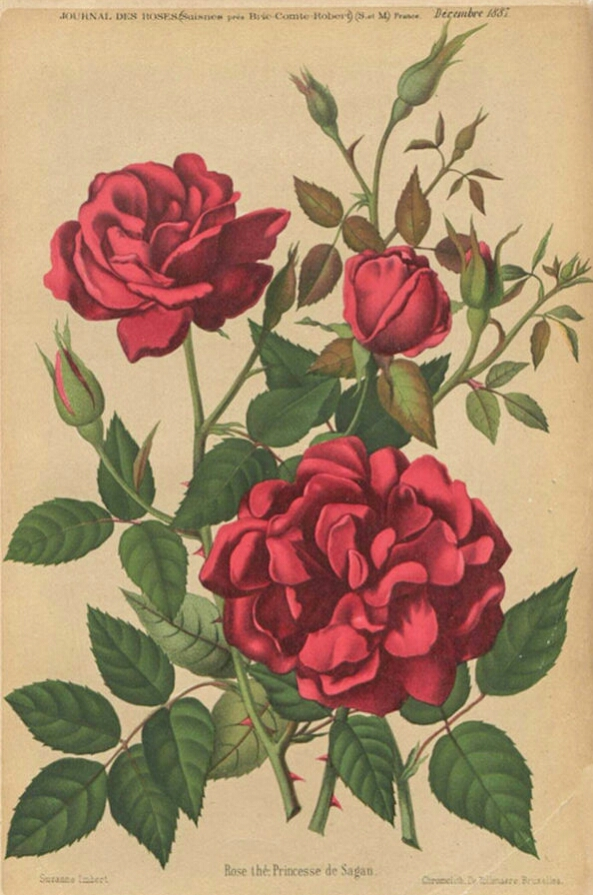
'Princesse de Sagan, (1887)

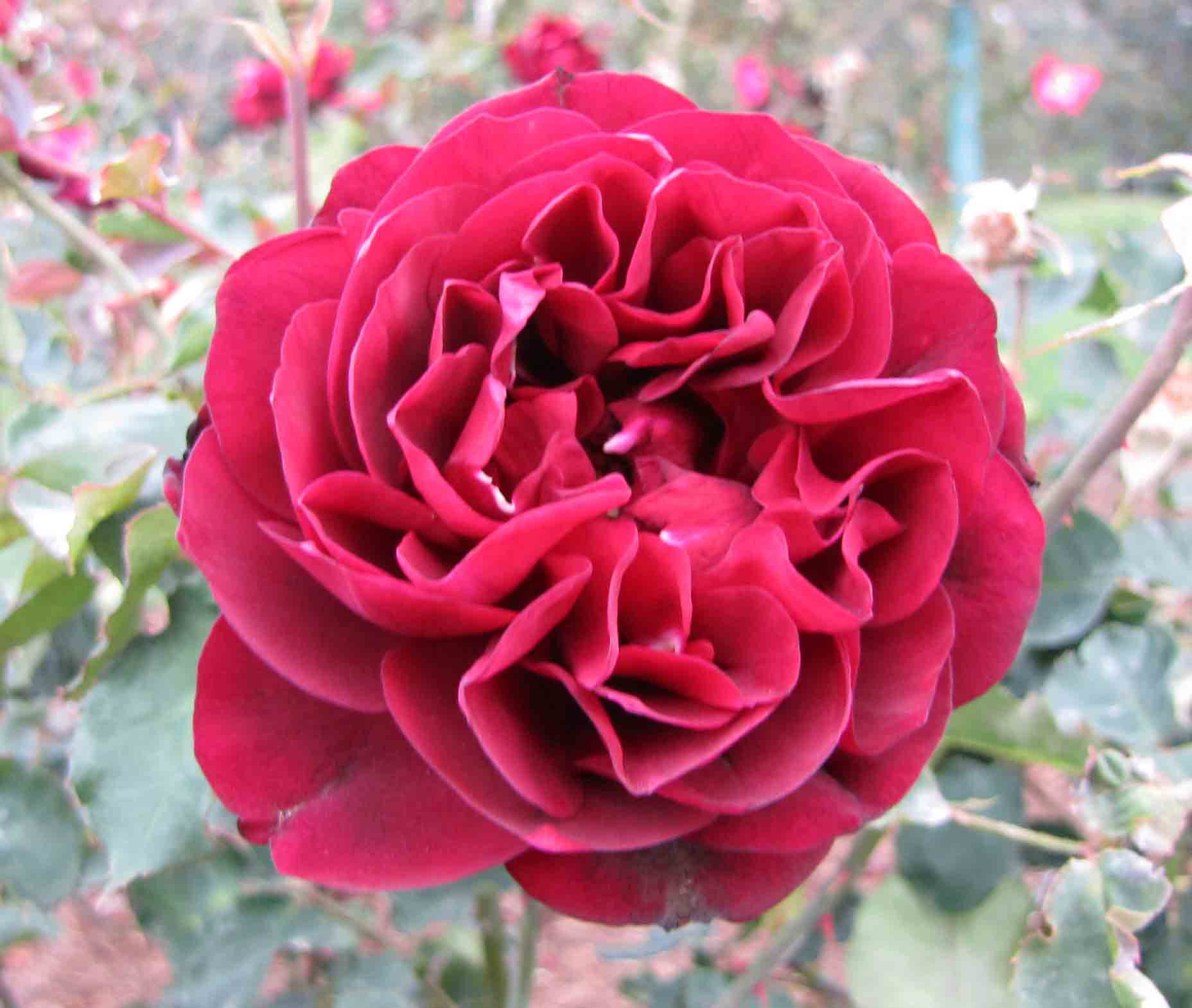
'Francis Dubreuil' (1894)

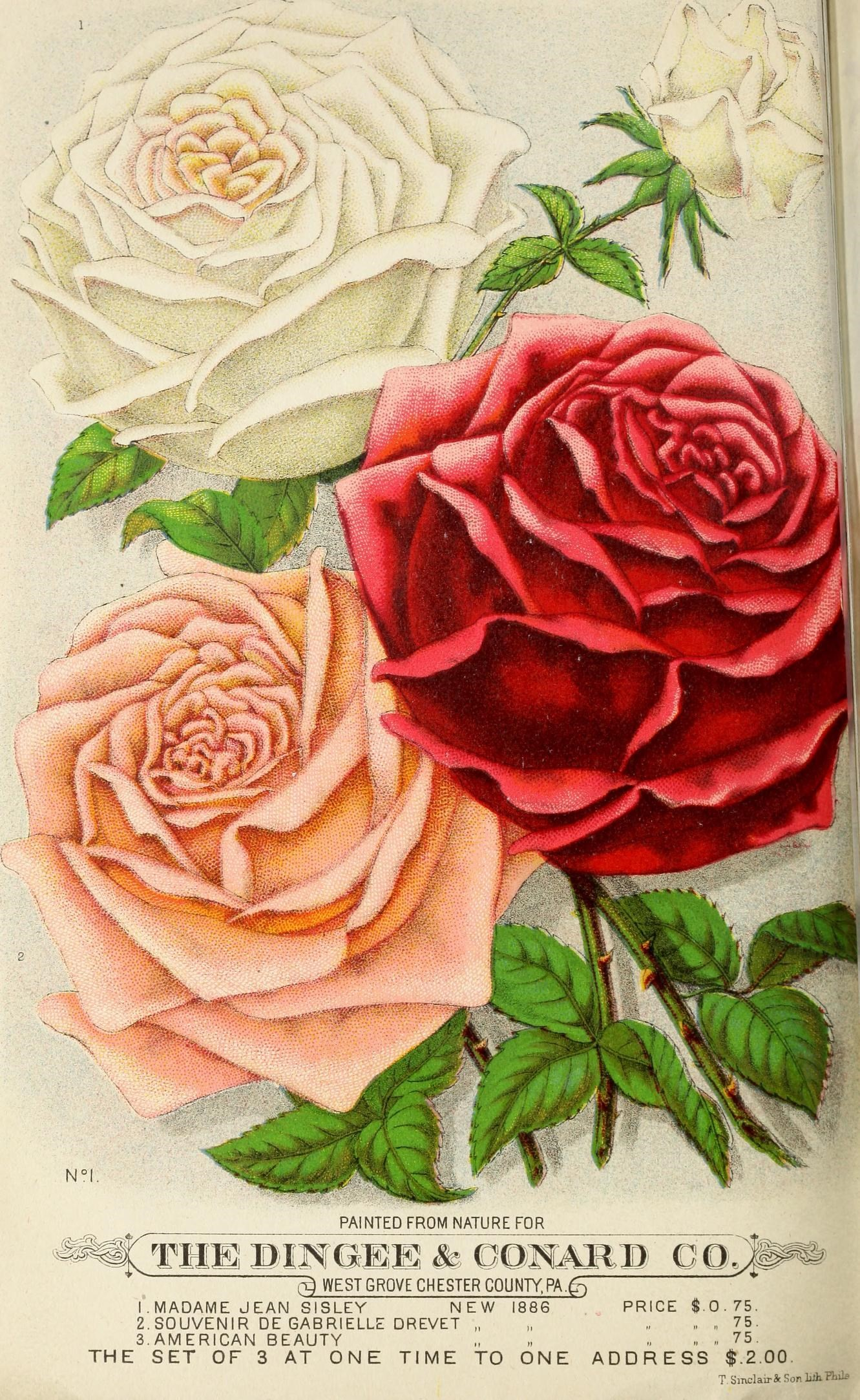
'Jean Sisley' (1898)

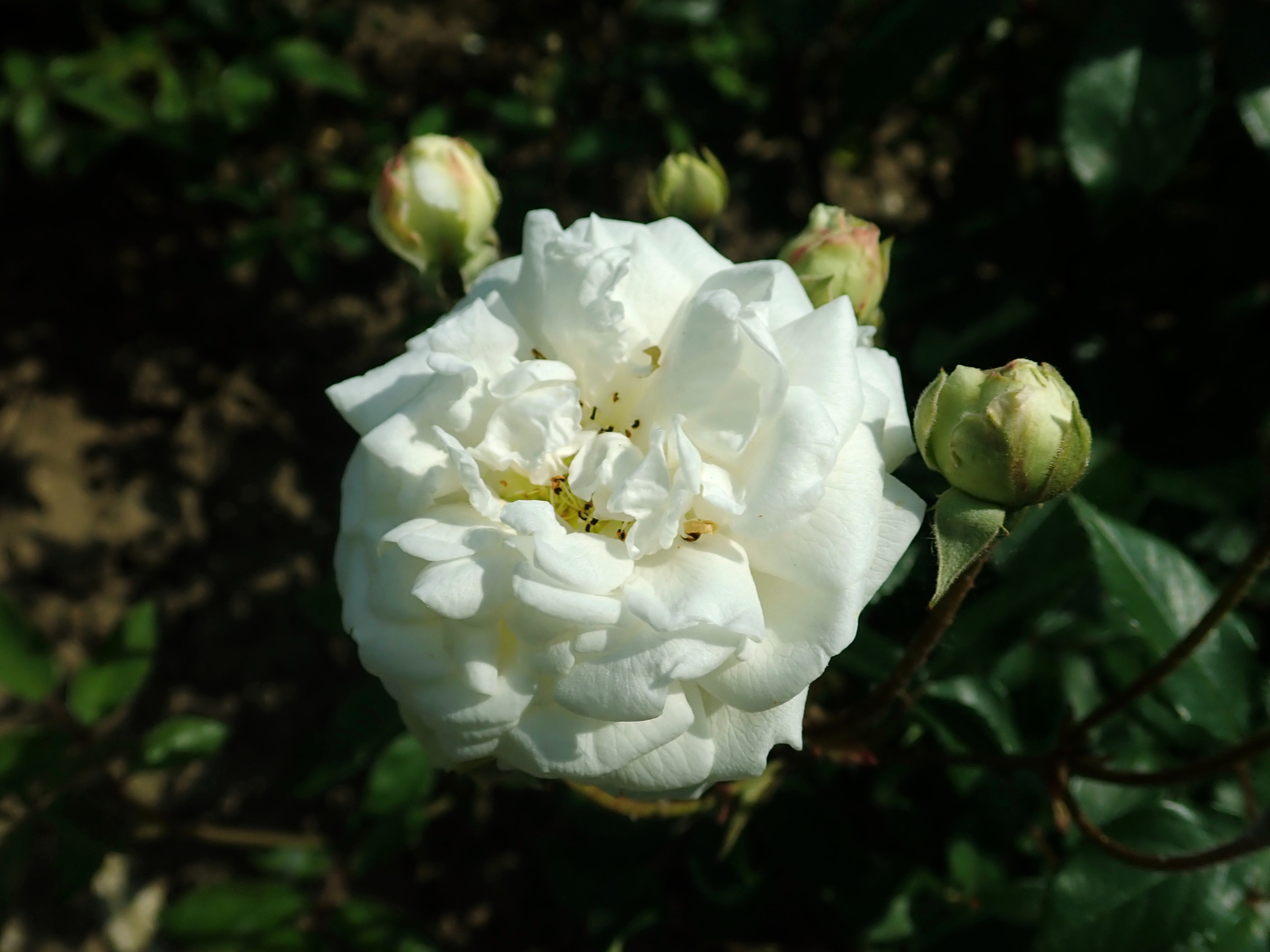
'Perle des Neiges', (1902)

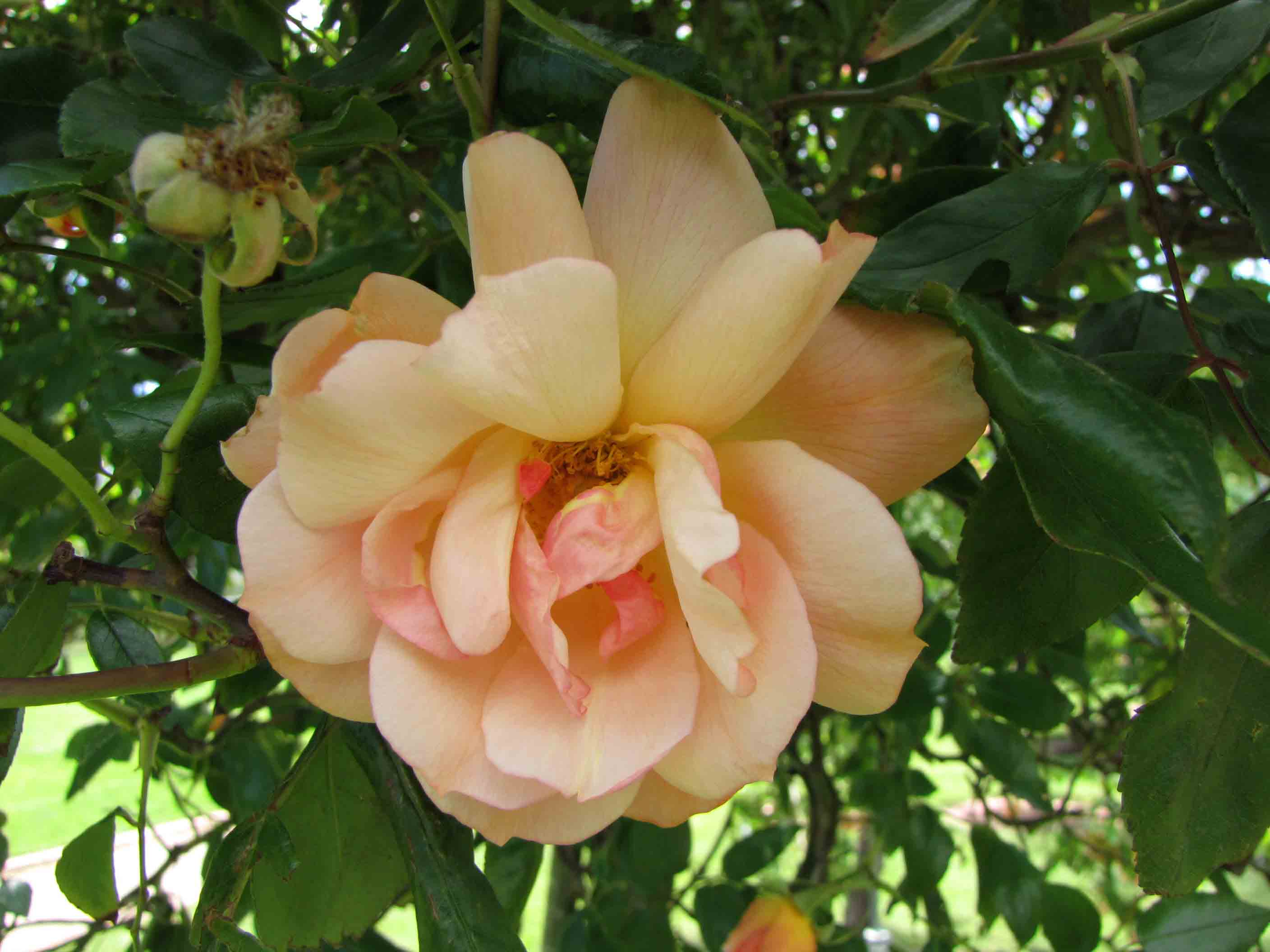
'Crepuscule' (1904)

== Sources ==
- Dickerson, Brent C (2001). The Old Rose Advisor (Volume 2). Portland, Oregon: IUniversie. ISBN 978-0595172993.
- Harkness, Jack (1985). The Maker of Heavenly Roses. ISBS. ISBN 978-0285626546.
- Quest-Ritson, Brigid; Quest-Ritson, Charles (2003). Encyclopedia of Roses. DK Publishing. ISBN 978-0756688684.
