= Tassin-la-Demi-Lune =

- Commune
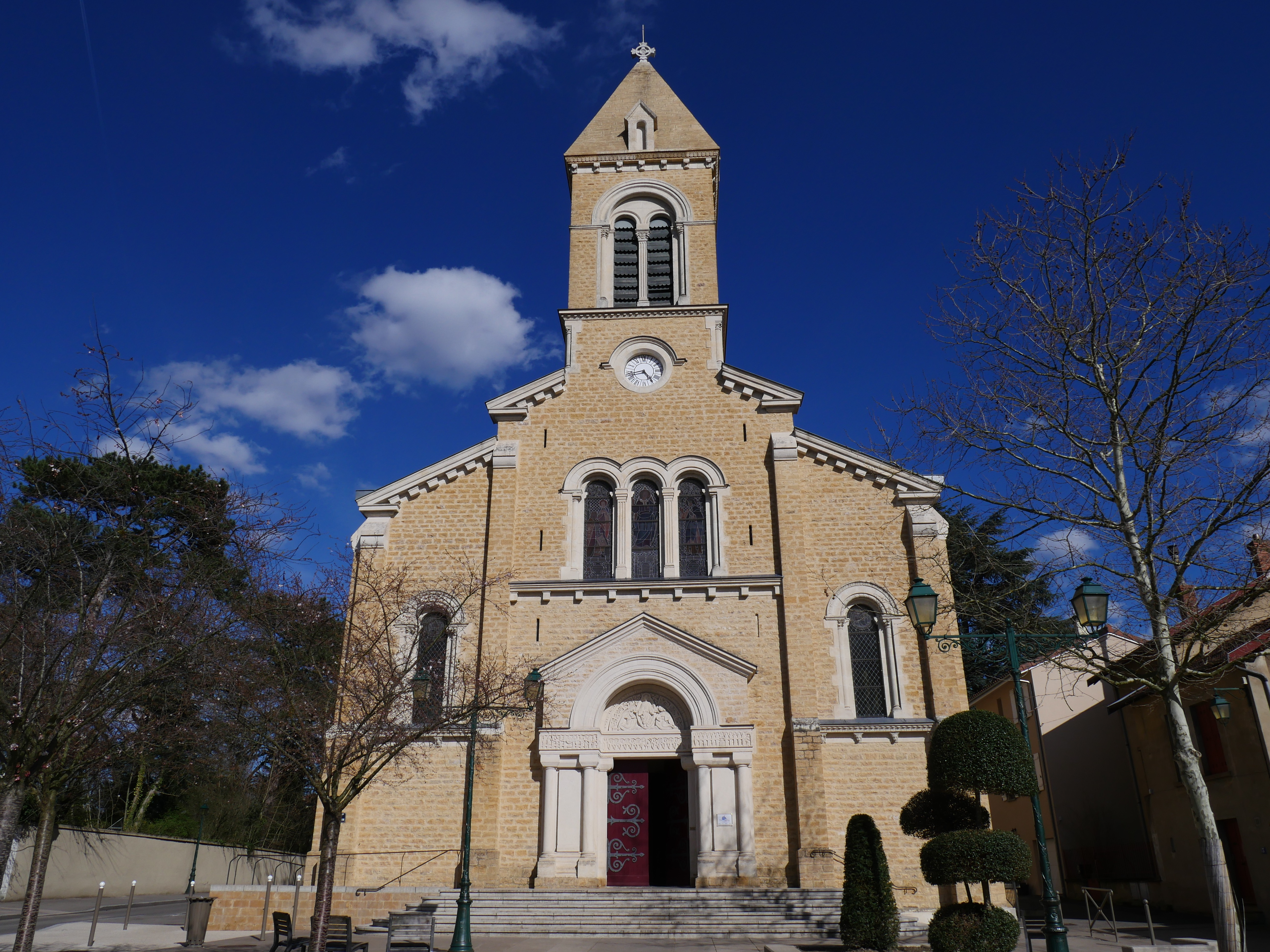
- Église Saint-Claude

- Coat of arms
- Location of Tassin-la-Demi-Lune
- Location within France Location within Auvergne-Rhône-Alpes
- Coordinates: 45°45′50″N 4°46′48″E
- Country: France
- Region: Auvergne-Rhône-Alpes
- Metropolis: Lyon Metropolis
- Arrondissement: Lyon

Government
  - Mayor (2020–2026): Pascal Charmot
- Area^{1}: 7.79 km^{2} (3.01 sq mi)
- Elevation: 225.2 m (739 ft)
- Highest elevation: 309 m (1,014 ft)
- Lowest elevation: 186 m (610 ft)
- Population (2023): 23,200
  - Density: 2,980/km^{2} (7,710/sq mi)
- Demonym: Tassilunois
- Time zone: UTC+01:00 (CET)
  - Summer (DST): UTC+02:00 (CEST)
- INSEE/Postal code: 69244 /69160
- Website: www.tassinlademilune.fr
- ^{1} French Land Register data, which excludes lakes, ponds, glaciers > 1 km^{2} (0.386 sq mi or 247 acres) and river estuaries.

Tassin-la-Demi-Lune (French pronunciation: [tasɛ̃ la d(ə)milyn]) or simply Tassin is a commune in the Metropolis of Lyon in the Auvergne-Rhône-Alpes region, central-eastern France.

== History ==
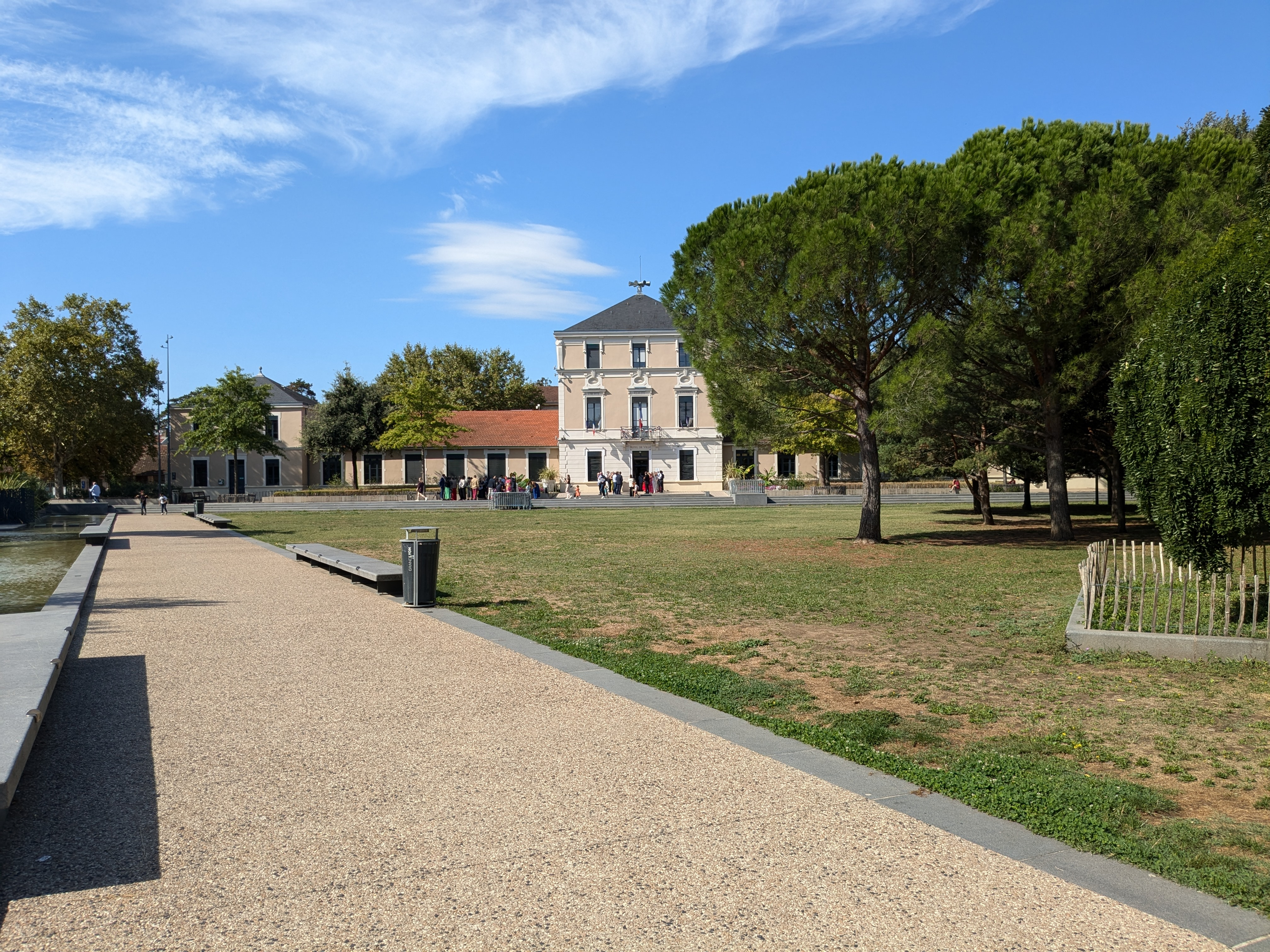
The Hôtel de Ville

The Hôtel de Ville was completed in 1886.

== Geography ==
The town of Tassin-la-Demi-Lune is located in the western suburbs of Lyon and is part of Lyon Metropolis.

The city is connected by four train stations: Écully-la-Demi-Lune, Tassin, Alaï and Le Méridien.

Several bus lines connect the city to the metro station Gorge de Loup (Line D): strong lines C21, C24 and C24E, as well as the normal bus lines 14, 72, 73 and 73E, 86 and 98. Line 5 and 55 also connected the city to other metro stations.

== Mayors ==
From	To	Name	Political party	Profession
1894	1896	Émile Lachize	-	Doctor
1896	1900	Alphonse Rieussec	-	Doctor
1900	1903	Émile Lachize	-	Doctor
1903	1908	Étienne Marin	-	-
1908	1930	Hippolyte Péragut	-	-
1930	1935	Pierre Vauboin	-	-
1935	1944	Édouard Ruelle	-	-
sept 1944	oct 1947	Joseph Huissoud	-	-
oct 1947	July 1952	Pierre Audras	-	-
oct 1952	March 1971	Joseph Huissoud	-	-
March 1971	April 1992	Georges Perret	UDF-CDS	-
April 1992	March 2004	Alain Imbert	RPR, then UMP	-
April 2004	April 2014	Jean-Claude Desseigne	UDI	-
April 2014	-	Pascal Charmot	UMP	-

== Demographics ==
Its inhabitants are named Tassilunois (masculine) and Tassilunoises (feminine) in French.

Historical population

Year	Pop.	±% p.a.
1793	395	—
1800	257	−5.96%
1806	326	+4.04%
1821	415	+1.62%
1831	656	+4.69%
1836	728	+2.10%
1841	816	+2.31%
1846	852	+0.87%
1851	868	+0.37%
1856	997	+2.81%
1861	1,081	+1.63%
1866	1,188	+1.91%
1872	1,422	+3.04%
1876	1,690	+4.41%
1881	2,664	+9.53%
1886	3,529	+5.78%
1891	3,479	−0.28%
1896	3,518	+0.22%
1901	4,056	+2.89%

Year	Pop.	±% p.a.
1906	4,528	+2.23%
1911	4,688	+0.70%
1921	5,263	+1.16%
1926	5,893	+2.29%
1931	6,512	+2.02%
1936	6,750	+0.72%
1946	7,675	+1.29%
1954	8,574	+1.39%
1962	10,930	+3.08%
1968	12,983	+2.91%
1975	14,886	+1.97%
1982	15,001	+0.11%
1990	15,460	+0.38%
1999	15,977	+0.37%
2007	18,278	+1.70%
2012	21,024	+2.84%
2017	22,297	+1.18%
2023	23,200	+0.66%

Source: EHESS and INSEE (1968–2023)

== Notable people ==
- Jérémy Berthod, footballer
- Corinne Maîtrejean, foil fencer
- Hélène Seuzaret, actress
- Woodkid, musician

== See also ==
- Communes of the Metropolis of Lyon
