= Garden roses =

Ornamental roses

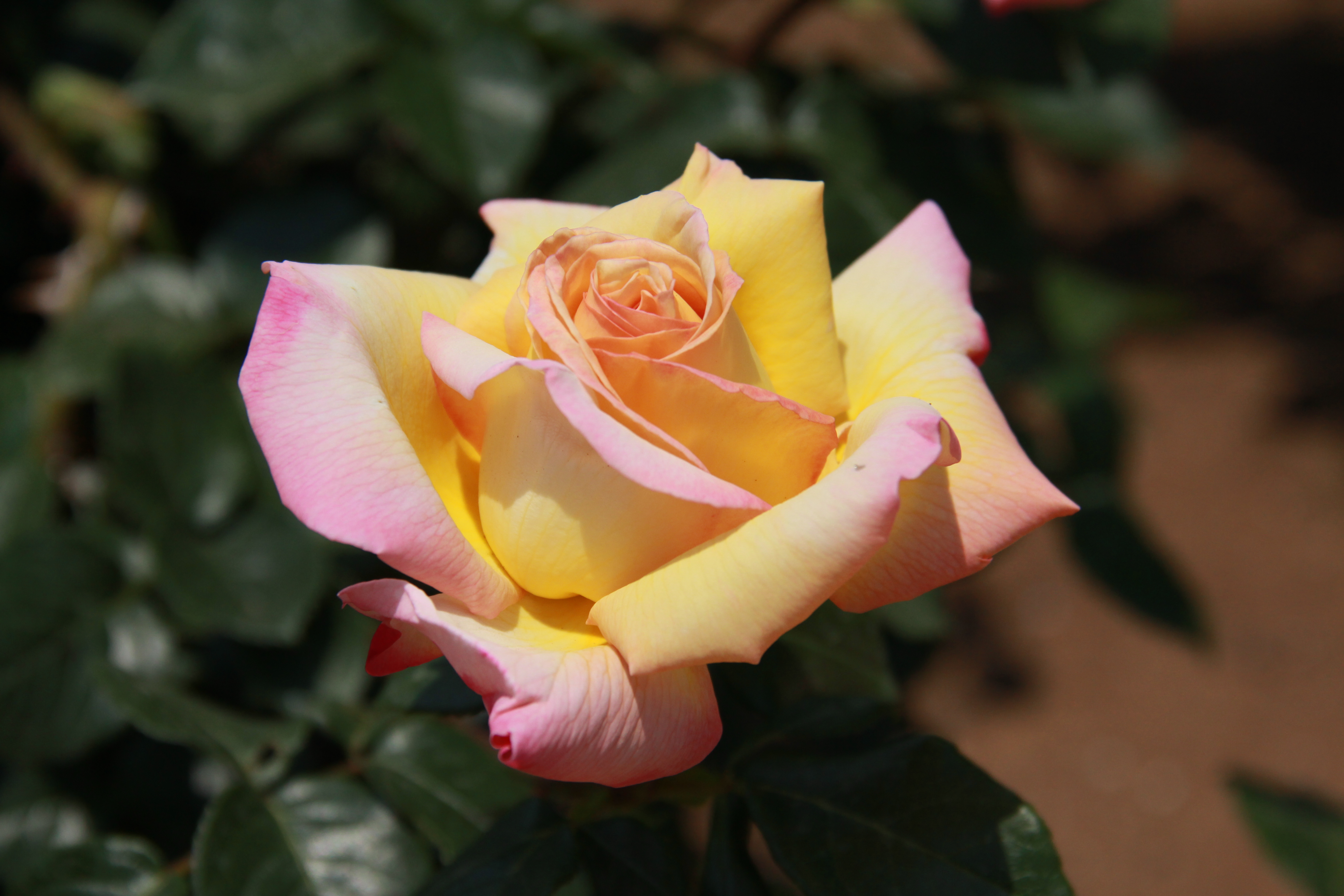
The hybrid tea rose, 'Peace'

Garden roses are hybrid roses that are grown as ornamental plants in private or public gardens. They are one of the most popular and widely cultivated groups of flowering plants, especially in temperate climates. An enormous number of garden cultivars has been produced, especially over the last two centuries, though roses have been known in the garden for millennia beforehand. While most garden roses are grown for their flowers, often in dedicated rose gardens, some are also valued for other reasons, such as having ornamental fruit, providing ground cover, or for hedging.

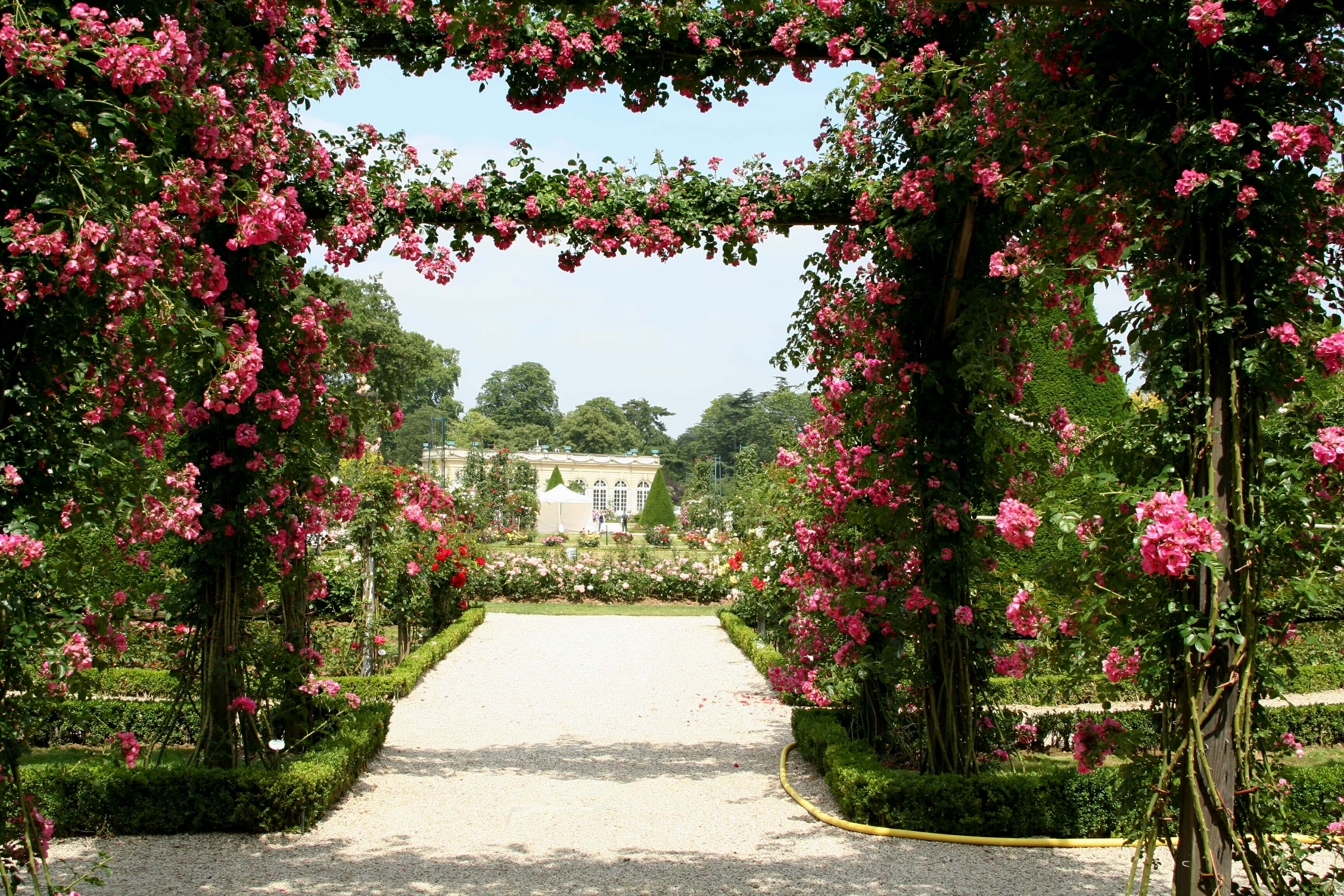
The climber 'American Pillar', trained over a pergola

The cultivars are classified in a number of different and overlapping ways, generally without much reference to strict botanical principles. Taking overall size and shape, the most common type is the bush rose, a rounded plant from 2 foot up to about 7 foot tall, above which height roses generally fall into the "climbing and rambling" class, the latter spreading wider; support is needed for these. There are also miniature roses, generally small bushes, and low sprawling ground cover roses, both up to about 15 inches tall. Most modern roses are propagated by budding onto rootstocks much closer to wild species; in "standard" shapes there is a single bare stem, with the graft at the top of that. Shrub roses are a rather loose category that include some of the original species and cultivars closely related to them, plus cultivars that grow rather larger than most bush roses. Technically all roses are shrubs. In terms of ancestry, roses are often divided into three main groups: Wild, Old Garden, and Modern Garden roses, with many subdivisions of these.

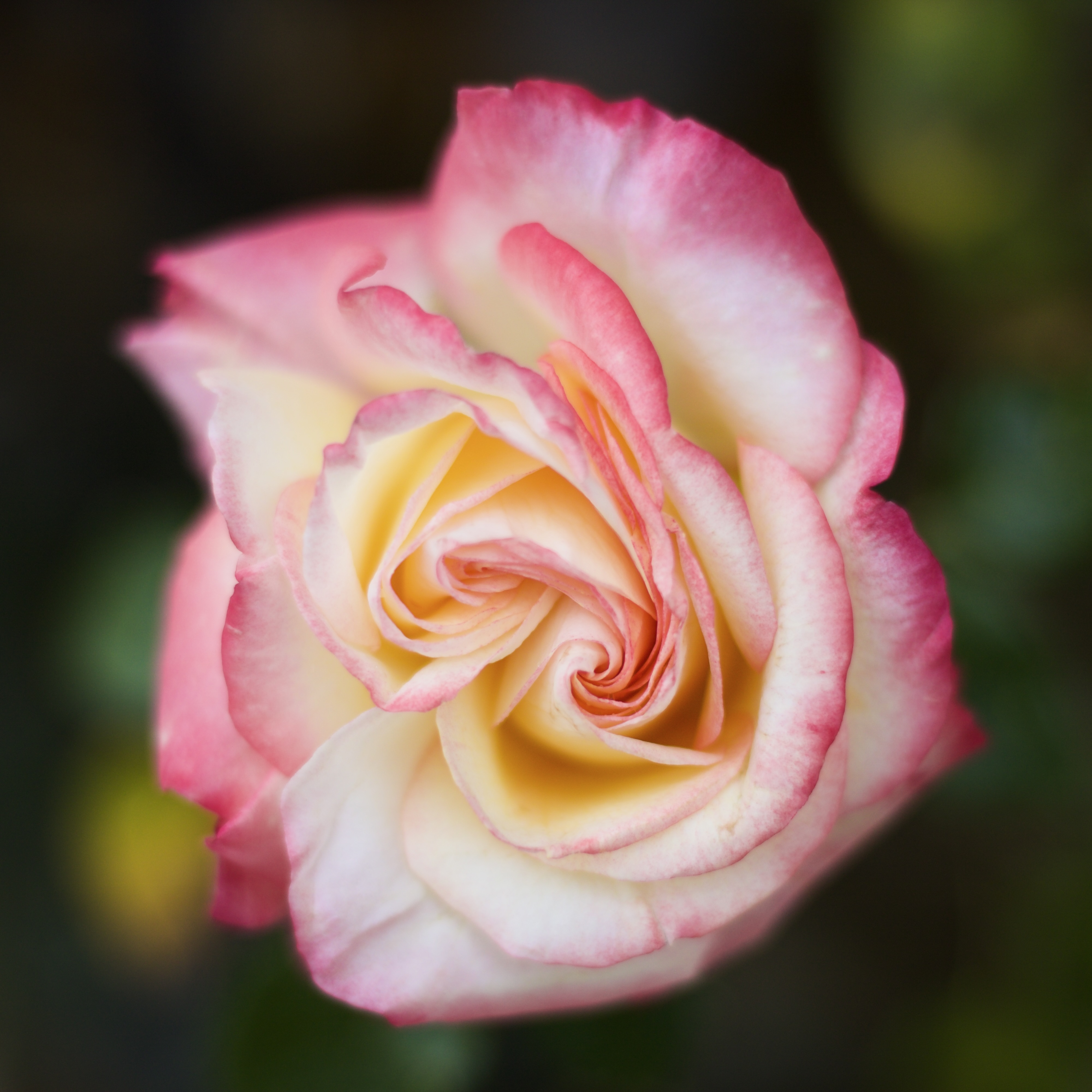
"Double delight" rose

Gardeners most value roses for their large and brightly coloured flowers, which exist in every colour in the white to yellow to red part of the colour spectrum. A truly blue rose has yet to be bred, but there are a number of shades of purple. There are single or double-flowered varieties, with the latter much more popular. The petals are typically of a single colour, although bi-colour, striped and blended varieties exist. The classic hybrid tea rose flower shape, pointing up, tightly curled in the centre, with the outer petals spreading wide, is the most popular for gardens, and even more dominant in florists. But there are many alternatives. Most of the wild parent species are single-flowered with flat blooms, flowering only once, and many are still grown in gardens. Most varieties produce a single flower on a stem, but floribunda roses, introduced in the early 20th century, have a spray of several flowers, and are highly popular; they also have more continuous flowering. Most garden varieties still have thorns, though fewer than those in wild species, but some are thornless. It is often complained that modern varieties are deficient in scent from the flowers, and many are. An important development in recent decades has been extending the flowering season, in some cases to eight months in the right conditions, though the flower display still tends to be best in one or two "flushes", the first in late spring.

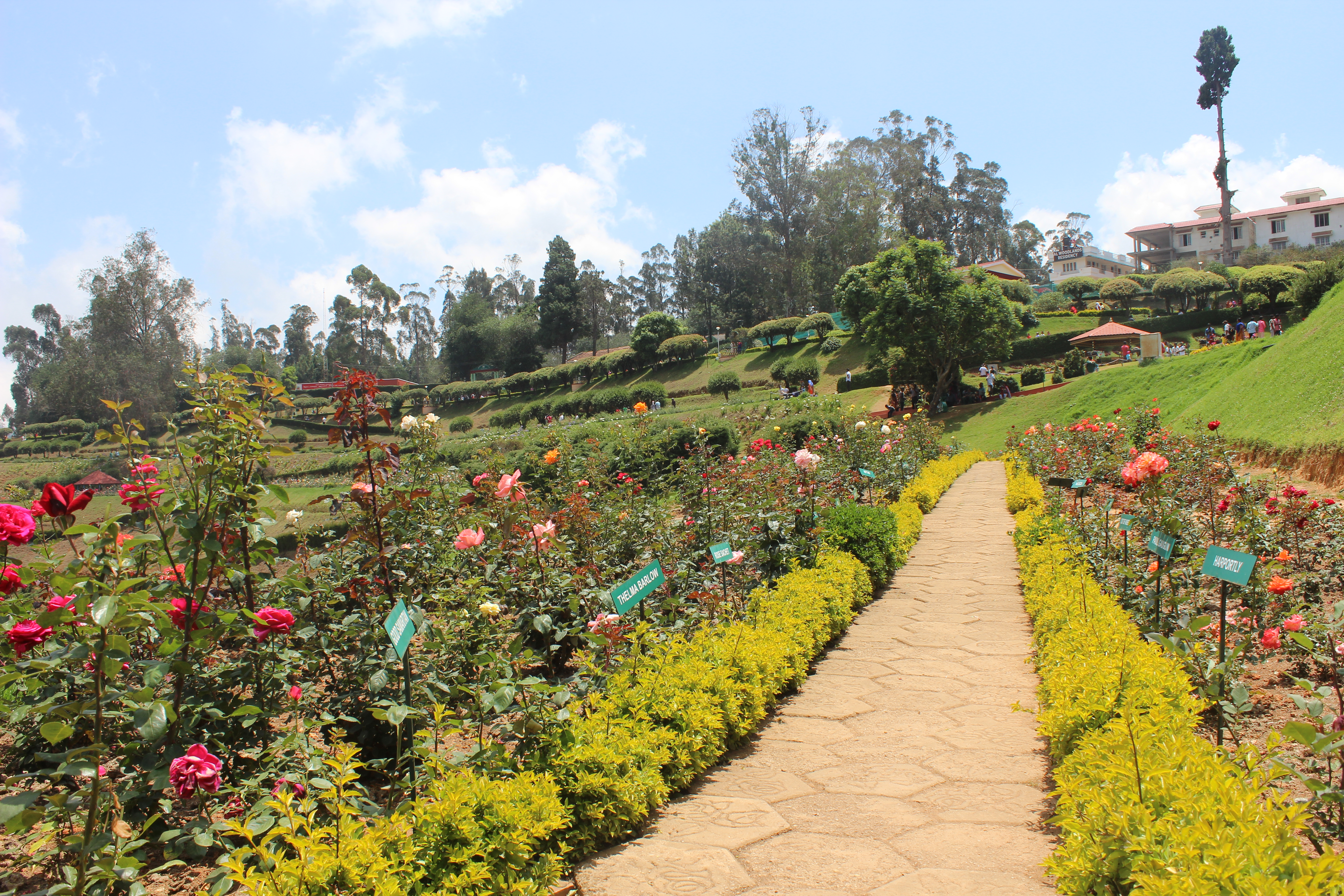
The Government Rose Garden, Ooty in South India; in the Tropic of Cancer, but at an altitude of 2200 metres

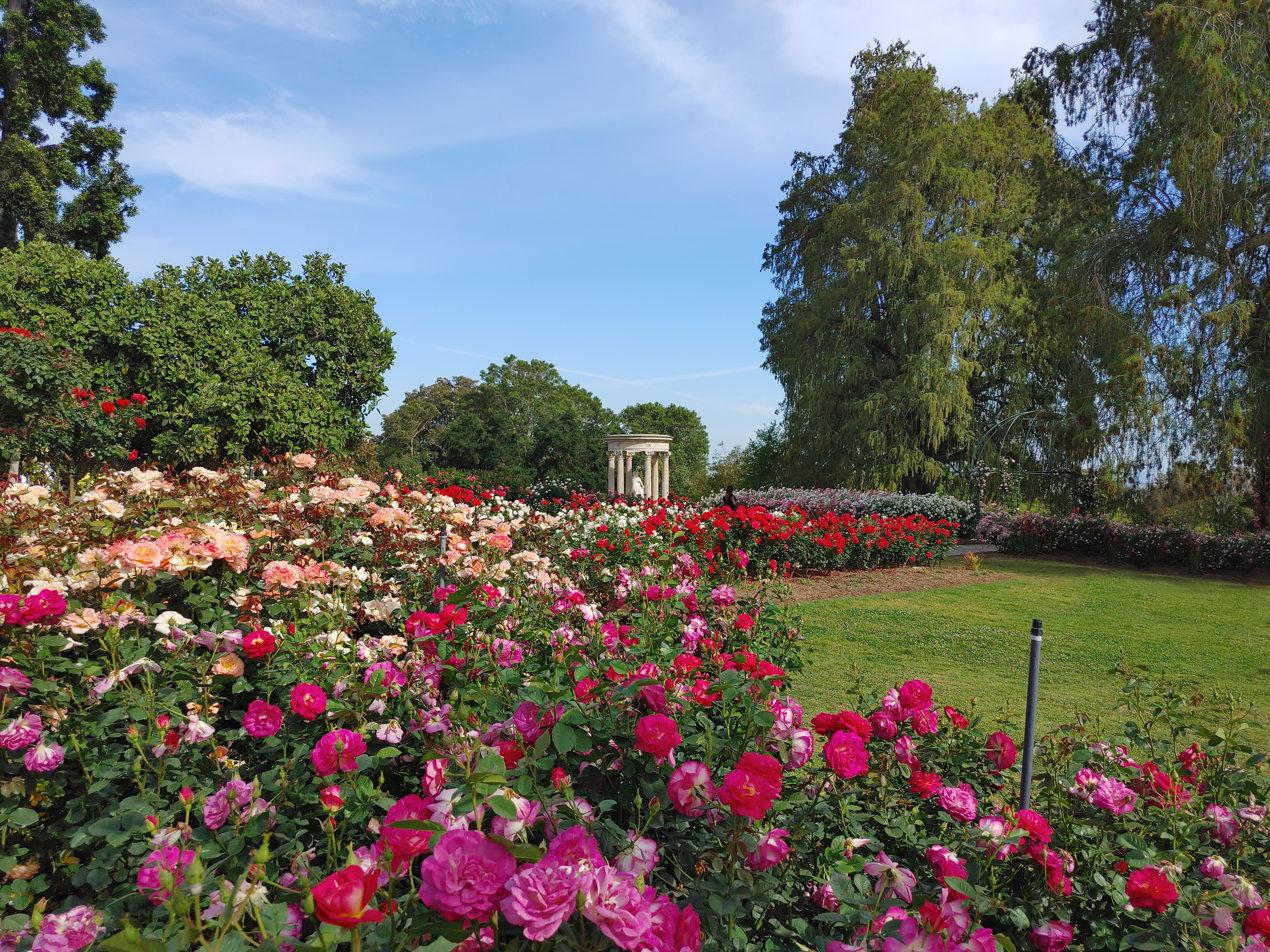
Rose Garden with variety of blooming roses at Huntington Library in San Marino, California, United States, April 2022

Roses are relatively easy to grow compared to many large-flowered garden plants, with the main effort, apart from basic watering and feeding, going into the pruning that most varieties need, and the training that many do. At least bush varieties are usually deadheaded, although some varieties are left for their decorative (and medicinal) rosehips. Roses are successfully grown in four continents, although a tropical climate is not ideal.

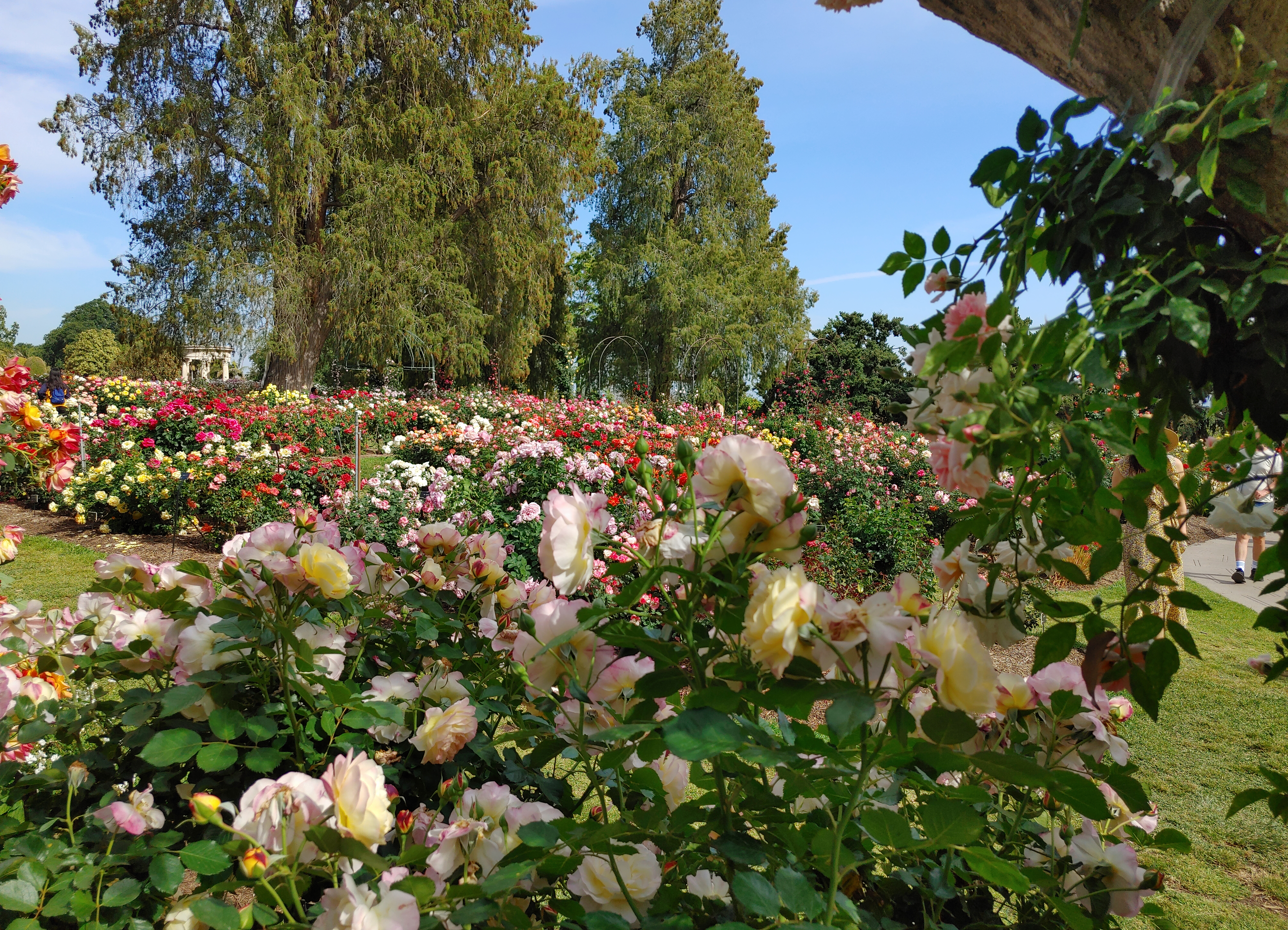
Blooming Roses at Huntington Library in San Marino, California, United States, April 2022

== History ==
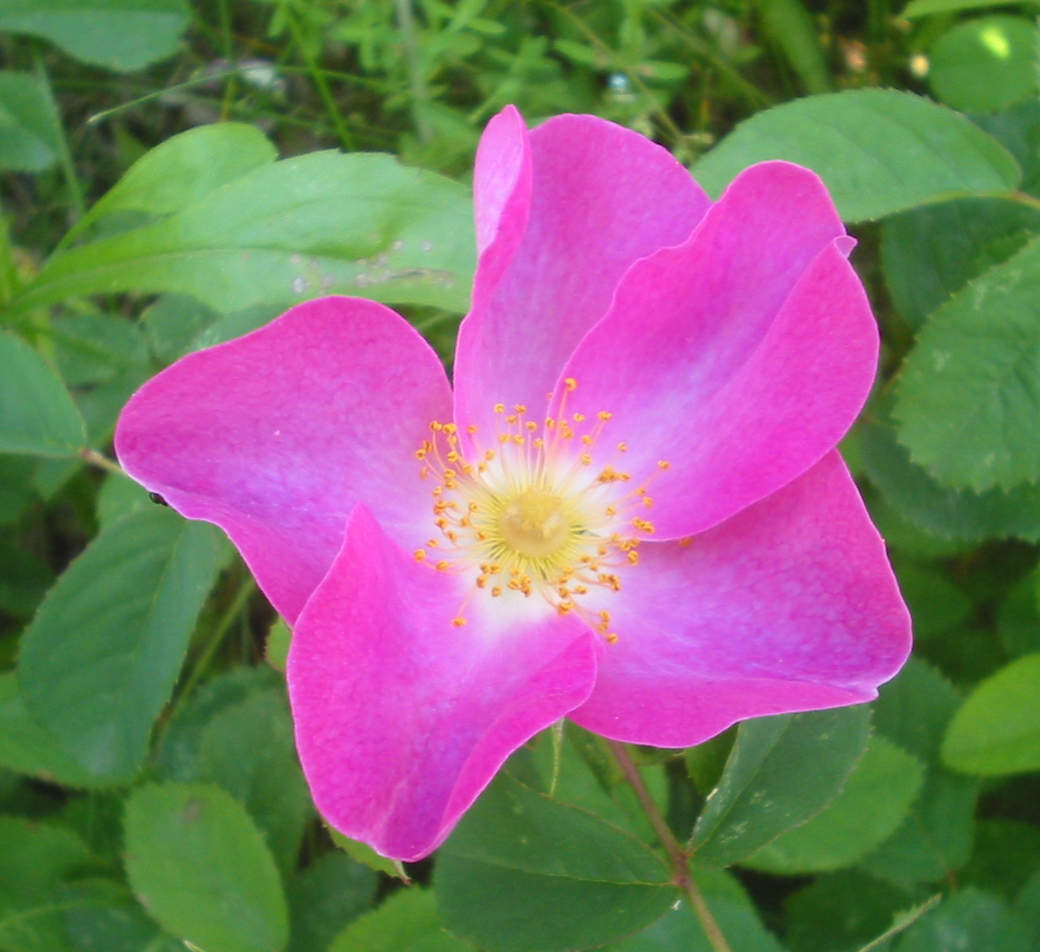
Wild Rosa gallica in Romania. Cultivated since ancient times, until the 19th century it was the most important species of rose to be cultivated in Europe; most modern European rose cultivars have at least a small contribution from R. gallica in their ancestry.

=== Origins ===
Roses have been grown in Eurasia since ancient times; they appear in Minoan jewellery and frescos from before 1400 BC, and in Egyptian tomb paintings some centuries later; however the Bible only mentions the plant twice. They are known to have been grown in ancient Babylon. Records exist of them being grown in Chinese gardens and Greek gardens from at least 500 BC, and the ancient Romans were extremely fond of them, putting rose petals in beds, and throwing them at festive occasions. They remained popular in Islamic and Chinese gardens.

Most of the plants grown in these early gardens are likely to have been species collected from the wild. However, there were large numbers of selected varieties being grown from early times; for instance numerous selections or cultivars of the China rose were in cultivation in China in the first millennium AD.

Of the over 150 species of rose, the Chinese Rosa chinensis has contributed most to today's garden roses; it has been bred into garden varieties for about 1,000 years in China, and over 200 in Europe. Among the old Chinese garden roses, the Old Blush group is the most primitive, while newer groups are the most diverse.

The significant breeding of modern times started slowly in Europe, from about the 17th century. This was encouraged by the introduction of new species, and especially by the introduction of the China rose into Europe in the 19th century. An enormous range of roses has been bred since then. A major contributor in the early 19th century was Empress Josephine of France who patronized the development of rose breeding at her gardens at Malmaison. As long ago as 1840 a collection numbering over one thousand different cultivars, varieties and species was possible when a rosarium was planted by Loddiges nursery for Abney Park Cemetery, an early Victorian garden cemetery and arboretum in England.

Although roses were found in modern-day Colorado from about 50 million years ago, the relatively few species native to the Americas have made almost no contribution to the parentage of garden rose hybrids. They are among worlds most popular ornamental flowering plants.

== Features ==
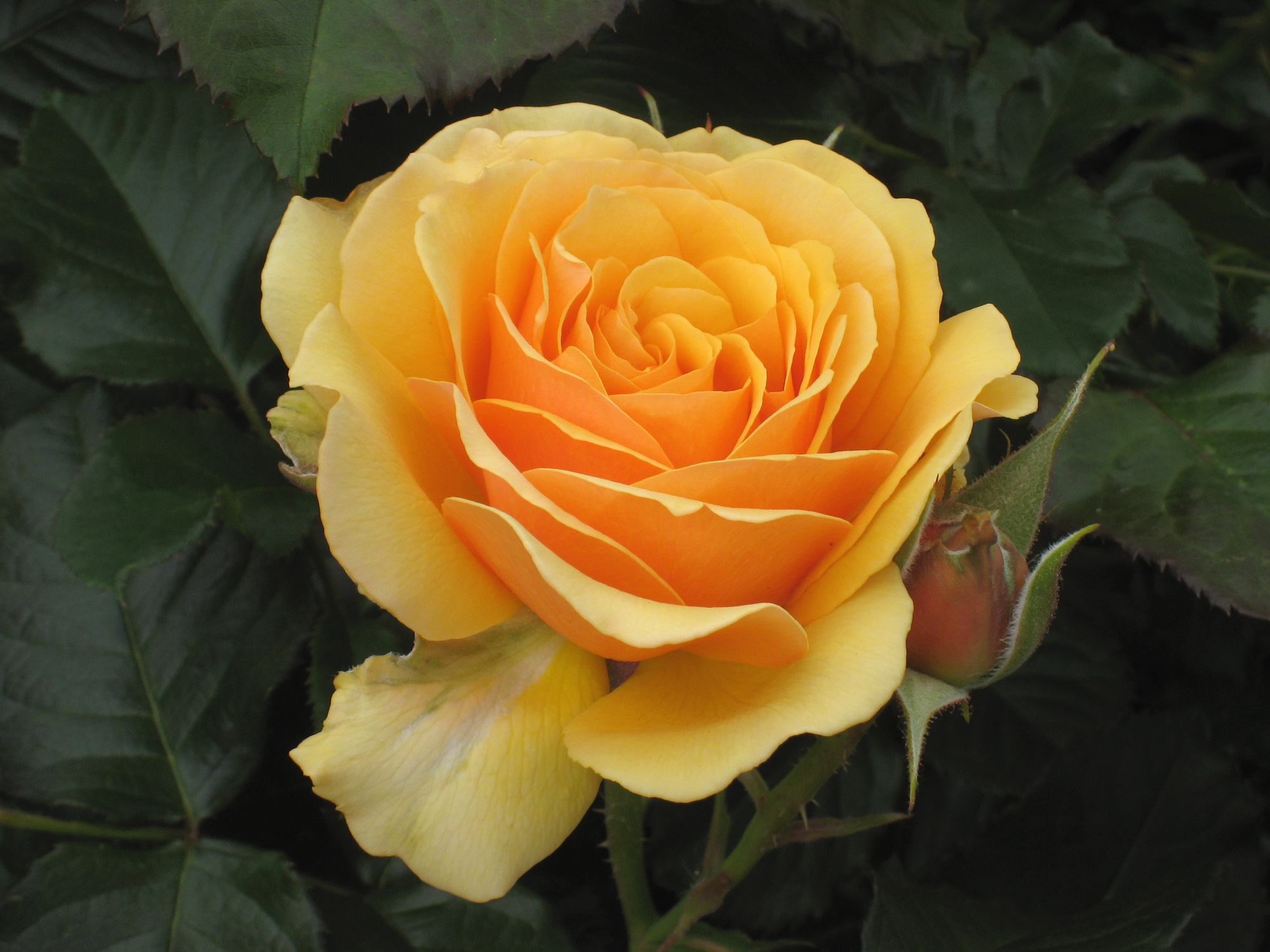
An amber-coloured rose

Roses are one of the most popular garden shrubs in the world with both indoor and outdoor appeal. They possess a number of general features that cause growers and gardeners to choose roses for their gardens. This includes the wide range of colours they are available in; the generally large size of flower, larger than most flowers in temperate regions; the variety of size and shape; the wide variety of species and cultivars that freely hybridize.

=== Colour of flowers ===
Rose flowers have historically been cultivated in a diverse number of colours ranging in intensity and hue; they are also available in countless combinations of colours which result in multicoloured flowers. Breeders have been able to widen this range through all the options available with the range of pigments in the species. This gives us yellow, orange, pink, red, white and many combinations of these colours. However, they lack the blue pigment that would give a true purple or blue colour and until the 21st century all true blue flowers were created using some form of dye. Now, through genetic modification, a Japanese company succeeded in creating a blue rose in 2004. Colours are bred through plant breeding programs which have existed for a long time. Roses are often bred for new and intriguing colour combinations which can fetch premium prices in market.

== Classification ==
There is no single system of classification for garden roses. In general, however, roses are placed in one of three main groups: Wild, Old Garden, and Modern Garden roses. The latter two groups are usually subdivided further according to hybrid lineage, although due to the complex ancestry of most rose hybrids, such distinctions can be imprecise. Growth habit and floral form are also used as means of classification. This is the most common method to classify roses as it reflects their growth habits.

=== Wild roses ===
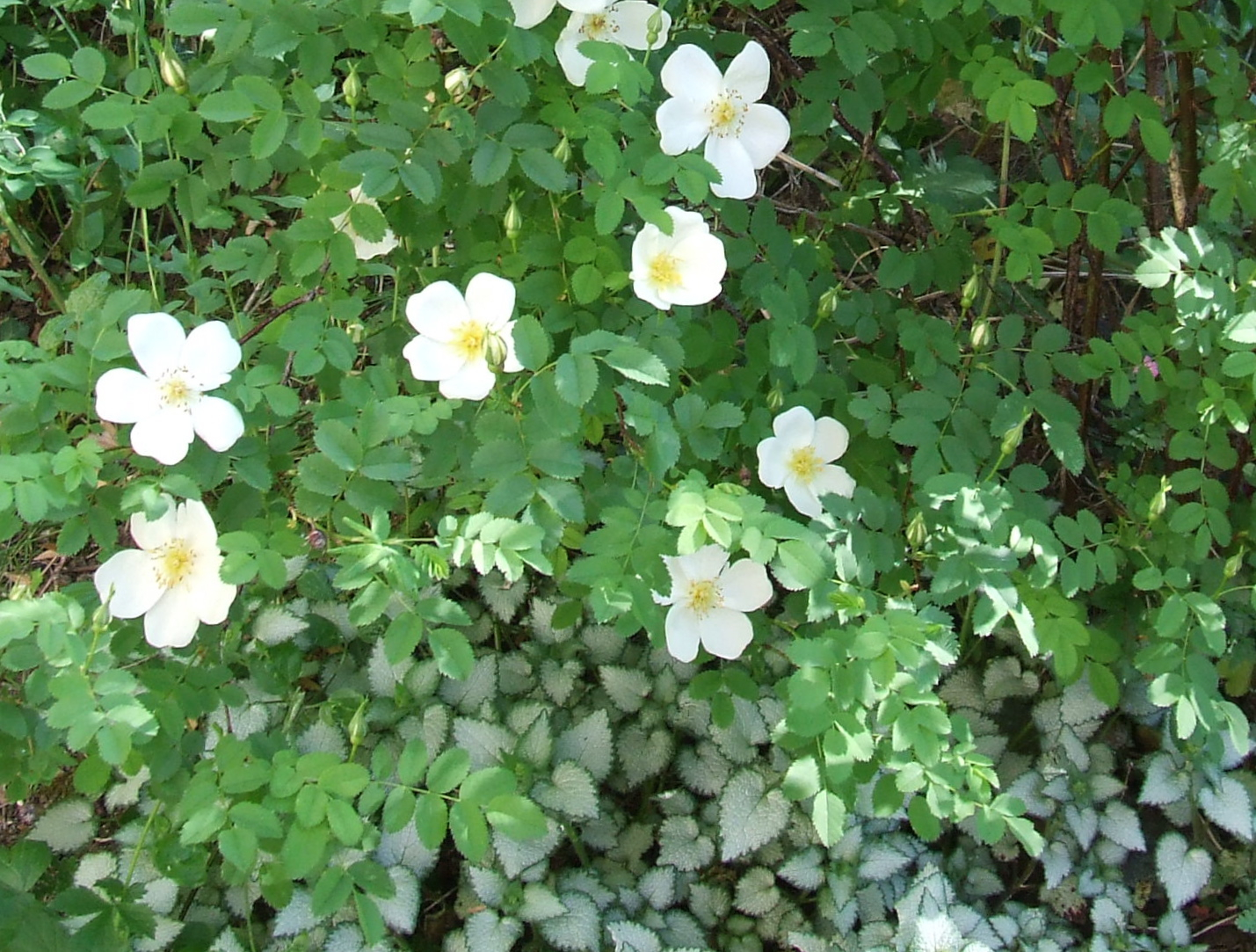
The spring-flowering pimpinellifolia 'Rosa Altaica', underplanted with lamium

Wild roses, also denominated "species roses", include the natural species and some of their immediate hybrid descendants. The wild roses commonly grown in gardens include Rosa moschata ("musk rose"), Rosa banksiae ("Lady Banks' rose"), Rosa pimpinellifolia ("Scots rose" or "burnet rose"), Rosa rubiginosa ("sweetbriar" or "eglantine"), and Rosa foetida in varieties 'Austrian Copper', 'Persian Double', and 'Harison's Yellow'. For most of these, the plants found in cultivation are often selected clones that are propagated vegetatively. Wild roses are low-maintenance shrubs in comparison to other garden roses, and they usually tolerate poor soil and some shade. They generally have only one flush of blooms per year, described as being "non-remontant", unlike remontant, modern roses. Some species have colorful hips in autumn, e. g. Rosa moyesii, or have colourful autumnal foliage, e. g. Rosa virginiana.

=== Old garden roses ===
An old garden rose is defined as any rose belonging to a class which existed before the introduction of the first modern rose, La France, in 1867. Alternative terms for this group include heritage and historic roses. In general, Old Garden roses of European or Mediterranean origin are once-blooming woody shrubs, with notably fragrant, double-flowered blooms primarily in shades of white, pink and crimson-red. The shrubs' foliage tends to be highly disease-resistant, and they generally bloom only from canes (stems) which formed in previous years. The introduction of China and Tea roses (see below) from East Asia around 1800 led to new classes of Old Garden Roses which bloom on new growth, often repeatedly from spring to fall. Most Old Garden Roses are classified into one of the following groups.

==== Alba Rosa ====
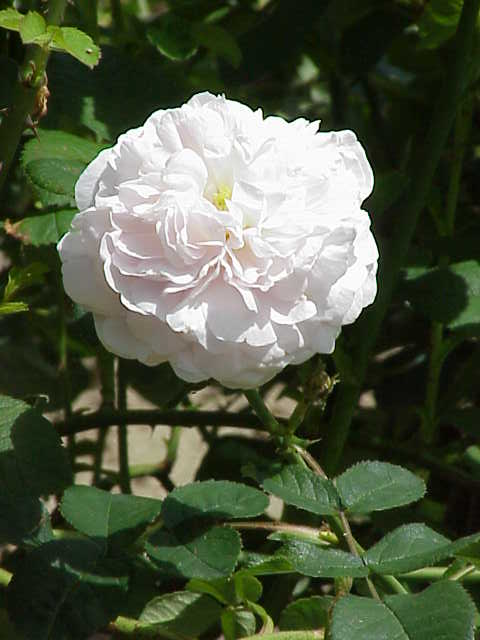
'Maiden's Blush', an Alba rose (before 1400)

Literally "white roses", derived from R. arvensis and the closely allied R. × alba. The latter species is a hybrid of R. gallica and R. canina. This group contains some of the oldest garden roses. The shrubs flower once yearly in the spring or early summer with scented blossoms of white or pale pink. They frequently have gray-green foliage and a vigorous or climbing habit of growth. Examples are 'Alba Semiplena', 'White Rose of York'.

==== Gallica ====
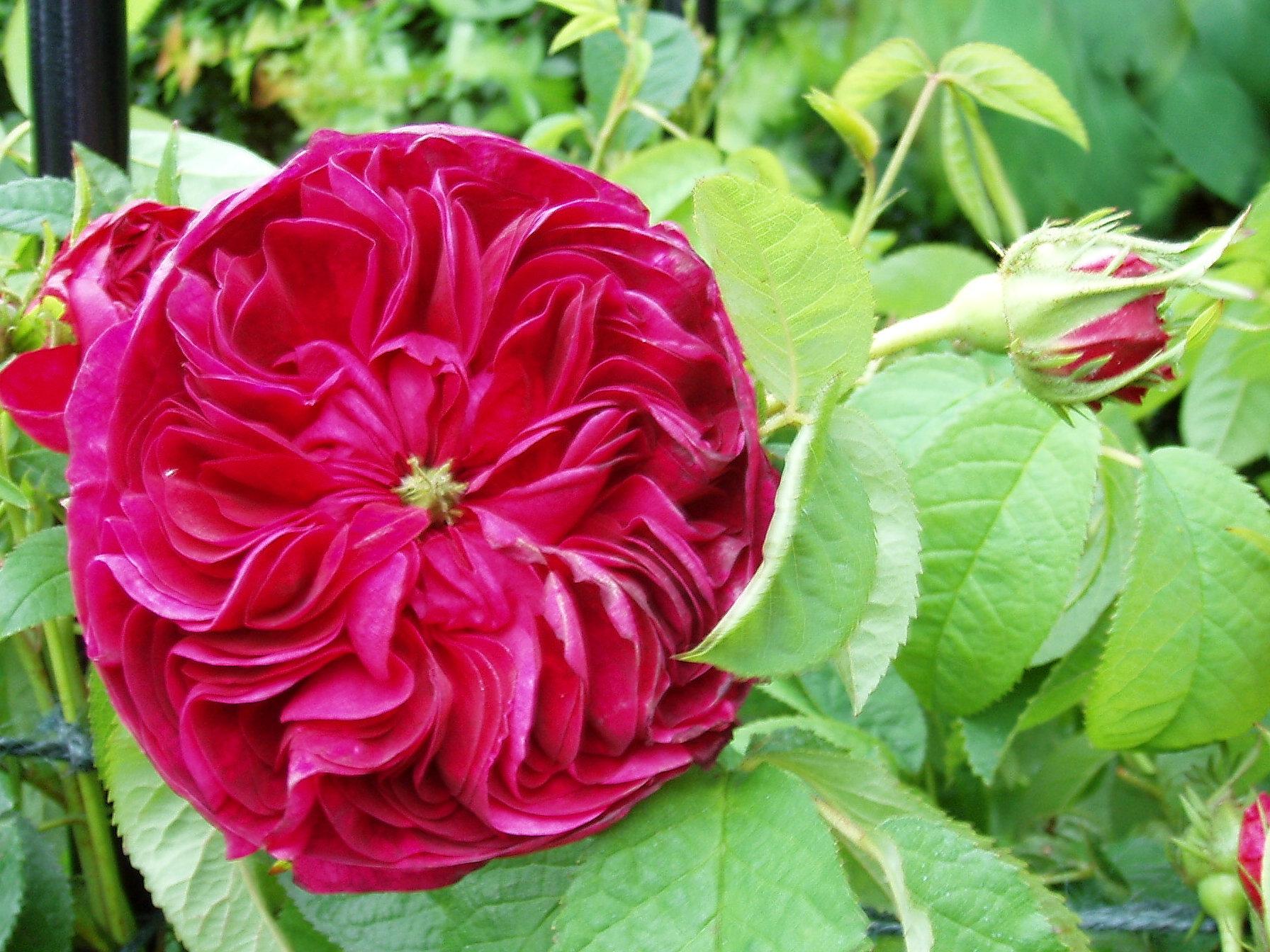
Gallica rose 'Charles de Mills', ante 1790

The Gallica, Gallica Hybrid, or Rose of Provins group is a very old class developed from Rosa gallica, which is a native of central and southern Europe and western Asia. The "Apothecary's Rose", R. gallica varietas officinalis, was grown in the Middle Ages in monastic herbaria for its alleged medicinal properties, and became famous in English history as the Red Rose of Lancaster. Gallicas are shrubs that rarely grow over 4 feet (1.25 m) tall and flower once in Summer. Unlike most other once-blooming Old Garden Roses, gallicas include cultivars with flowers in hues of red, maroon, and purplish crimson. Examples include 'Cardinal de Richelieu', 'Charles de Mills', and 'Rosa Mundi' (R. gallica varietas versicolor).

==== Damask ====
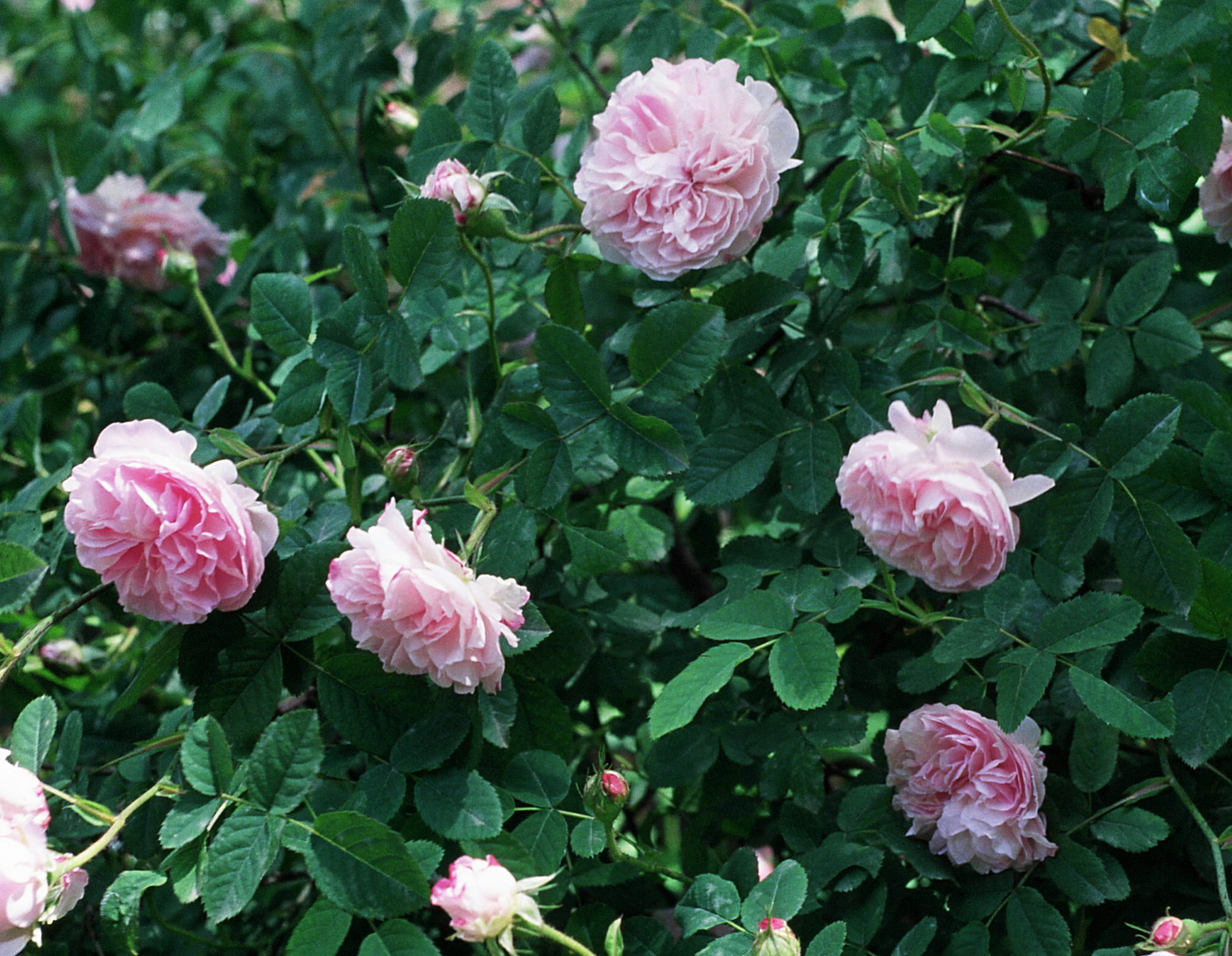
'Autumn Damask' ('Quatre Saisons')

Named for Damascus, Damask roses (Rosa × damascena) originated in ancient times with a natural hybrid (Rosa moschata × Rosa gallica) × Rosa fedtschenkoana. Robert de Brie is given credit for bringing damask roses from the Middle East to Europe sometime between 1254 and 1276, although there is evidence from ancient Roman frescoes that at least one damask rose existed in Europe for hundreds of years before this. Summer damasks bloom once in summer. Autumn or Four Seasons damasks bloom again later, albeit less exuberantly, and these were the first remontant (repeat-flowering) Old European roses. Damask roses tend to have rangy to sprawling growth habits and strongly scented blooms. Examples: 'Ispahan', 'Madame Hardy'.

==== Centifolia or Provence ====
Centifolia roses are also known as Cabbage roses, or as Provence roses. They are derived from Rosa × centifolia, a hybrid that appeared in the 17th century in the Netherlands, related to damask roses. They are named for their "one hundred" petals; they are often called "cabbage" roses due to the globular shape of the flowers. The centifolias are all once-flowering. As a class, they are notable for their inclination to produce mutations of various sizes and forms, including moss roses and some of the first miniature roses (see below). Examples: 'Centifolia', 'Paul Ricault'.

==== Moss ====
The Moss roses are based on one or more mutations, particularly one that appeared early on Rosa × centifolia, the Provence or cabbage rose. Some with Damask roses as a parent may be derived from a separate mutation. Thickly growing or branched resin-bearing hairs, particularly on the sepals, are considered to resemble moss and give off a pleasant woods or balsam scent when rubbed. Moss roses are cherished for this trait, but as a group they have not contributed to the development of new rose classifications. Various hybrids with other roses have yielded different forms, such as the modern miniature creeping moss rose 'Red Moss Rambler' (Ralph S. Moore, 1990). Moss roses with centifolia background are once-flowering; some moss roses exhibit repeat-blooming, indicative of Autumn Damask parentage. Examples: 'Common Moss' (centifolia-moss), 'Mousseline', also known as 'Alfred de Dalmas' (Autumn Damask moss).

==== Portland ====
The Portland roses were long thought to be the first group of crosses between China roses and European roses, and to show the influence of Rosa chinensis. Recent DNA analysis however has demonstrated that the original Portland Rose has no Chinese ancestry, but has an autumn damask/gallica lineage. This group of roses was named after the Duchess of Portland who received (from Italy about 1775) a rose then known as R. paestana or 'Scarlet Four Seasons' Rose' (now known simply as 'The Portland Rose'). The whole class of Portland roses was developed from that one rose. The first repeat-flowering class of rose with fancy European-style blossoms, the plants tend to be fairly short and shrubby, with a suckering habit, with proportionately short flower stalks. The main flowering is in the summer, but intermittent flowers continue into the autumn. Examples: 'James Veitch', 'Rose de Rescht', 'Comte de Chambord'.

==== China ====
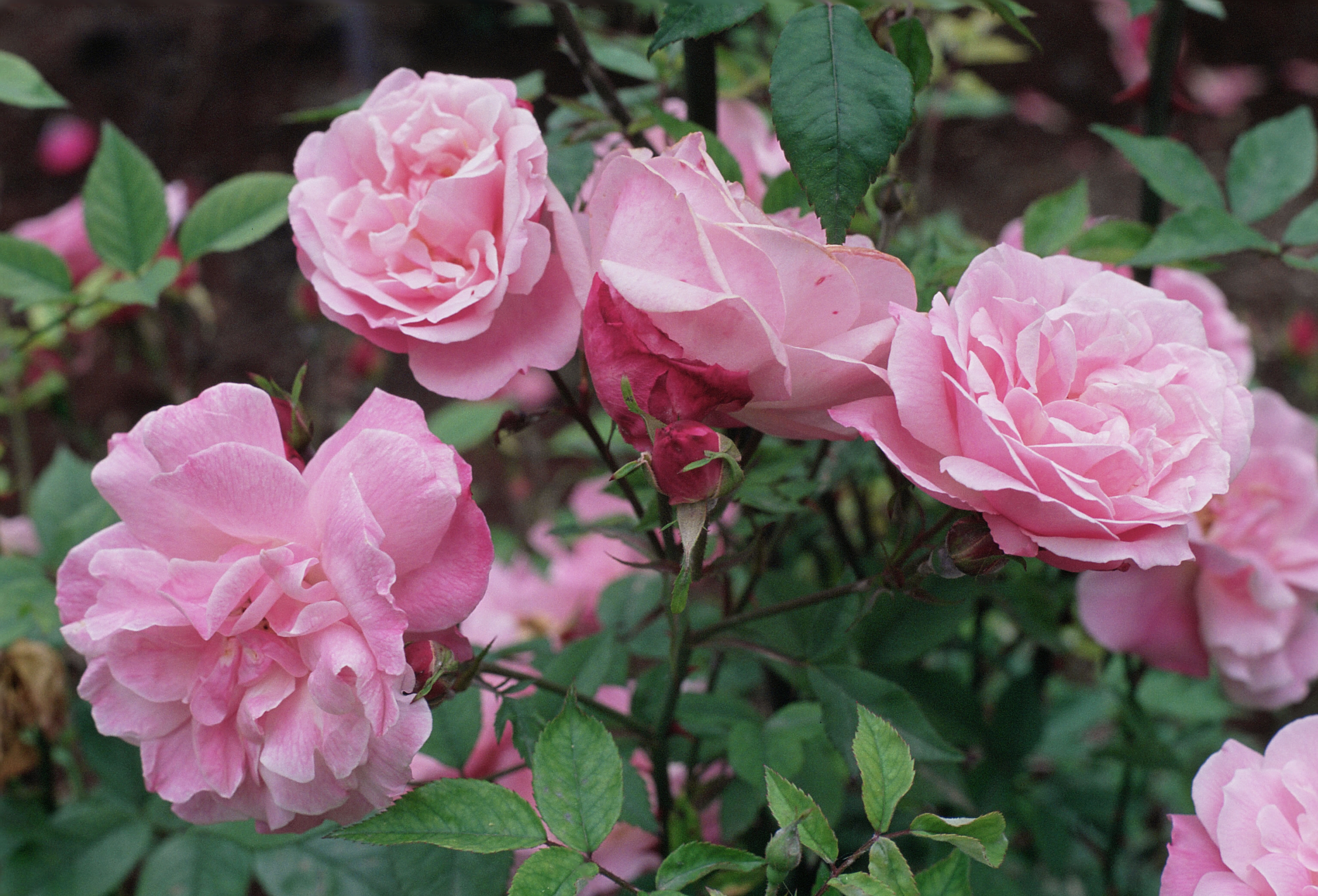
'Parson's Pink China' or 'Old Blush,' one of the "stud Chinas"

The China roses, based on Rosa chinensis, have been cultivated in East Asia for centuries. They have been cultivated in Western Europe since the late 18th century. They contribute much to the parentage of today's hybrid roses, and they brought a change to the form of the flowers then cultivated in Europe. Compared with the older rose classes known in Europe, the Chinese roses had less fragrant, smaller blooms carried over twiggier, more cold-sensitive shrubs. However they could bloom repeatedly throughout the summer and into late autumn, unlike their European counterparts. The flowers of China roses were also notable for their tendency to "suntan," or darken over time unlike other blooms which tended to fade after opening. This made them highly desirable for hybridisation purposes in the early 19th century. According to Graham Stuart Thomas, China roses are the class upon which modern roses are built. Today's exhibition rose owes its form to the China genes, and the China roses also brought slender buds which unfurl when opening. Tradition holds that four "stud China" roses—'Slater's Crimson China' (1792), 'Parsons' Pink China' (1793), and the Tea roses 'Hume's Blush Tea-scented China' (1809) and 'Parks' Yellow Tea-scented China' (1824)—were brought to Europe in the late 18th and early 19th centuries; in fact there were rather more, at least five Chinas not counting the Teas having been imported. This brought about the creation of the first classes of repeat-flowering Old Garden Roses, and later the Modern Garden Roses. Examples: 'Old Blush China', 'Mutabilis' (Butterfly Rose), 'Cramoisi Superieur'.

==== Tea ====
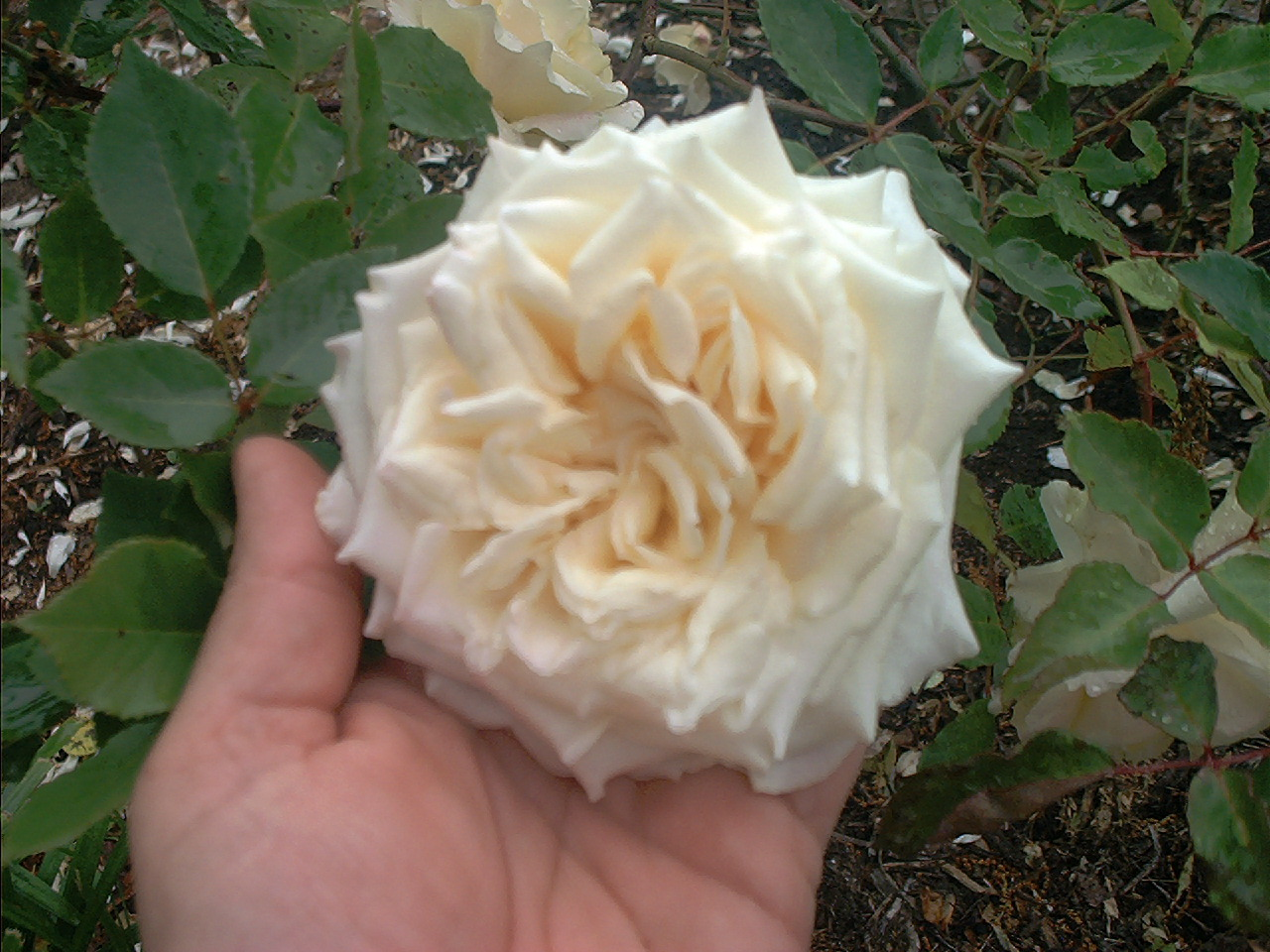
Tea rose 'Mrs Dudley Cross' (Paul 1907)

The original Tea-scented Chinas (Rosa × odorata) were Oriental cultivars thought to represent hybrids of R. chinensis with R. gigantea, a large Asian climbing rose with pale-yellow blossoms. Immediately upon their introduction to the Western World from Canton, China in the early 19th-century, breeders went to work with them, especially in France, crossing them first with China roses and then with Bourbons and Noisettes. The Tea roses are repeat-flowering roses, named for their fragrance being reminiscent of Chinese black tea (although this is not always the case). The colour range includes pastel shades of white, pink and (a novelty at the time) yellow to apricot. The individual flowers of many cultivars are semi-pendent and nodding, due to weak flower stalks. In a "typical" Tea, pointed buds produce high-centred blooms which unfurl in a spiral fashion, and the petals tend to roll back at the edges, producing a petal with a pointed tip; the Teas are thus the originators of today's "classic" florists' rose form. According to rose historian Brent Dickerson, the Tea classification owes as much to marketing as to botany; 19th-century nurserymen would label their Asian-based cultivars as "Teas" if they possessed the desirable Tea flower form, and "Chinas" if they did not. Like the Chinas, the Teas are not hardy in colder climates. Examples: 'Lady Hillingdon', 'Maman Cochet', 'Duchesse de Brabant', 'Mrs. Foley Hobbs'.

==== Bourbons ====
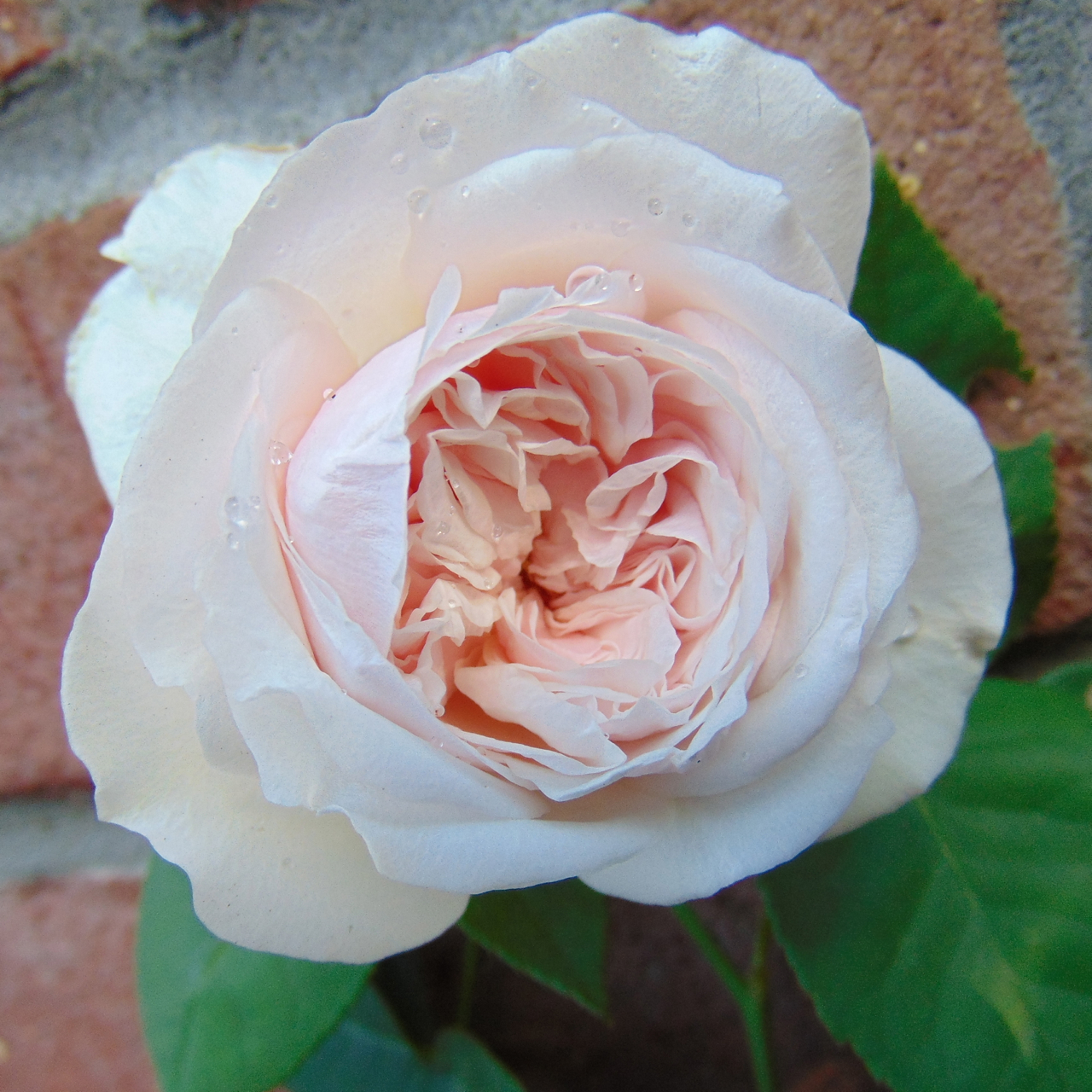
Bourbon rose Rosa 'Souvenir de la Malmaison' (Béluze 1843)

Bourbon roses originated on the Île Bourbon (now called Réunion) off the coast of Madagascar in the Indian Ocean. They are believed to be the result of a cross between the Autumn Damask and the 'Old Blush' China rose, both of which were frequently used as hedging materials on the island. They flower repeatedly on vigorous, frequently semi-climbing shrubs with glossy foliage and purple-tinted canes. They were first Introduced in France in 1820 by Henri Antoine Jacques. Examples: 'Louise Odier', 'Mme. Pierre Oger', 'Zéphirine Drouhin' (the last example is often classified under climbing roses).

==== Noisette ====
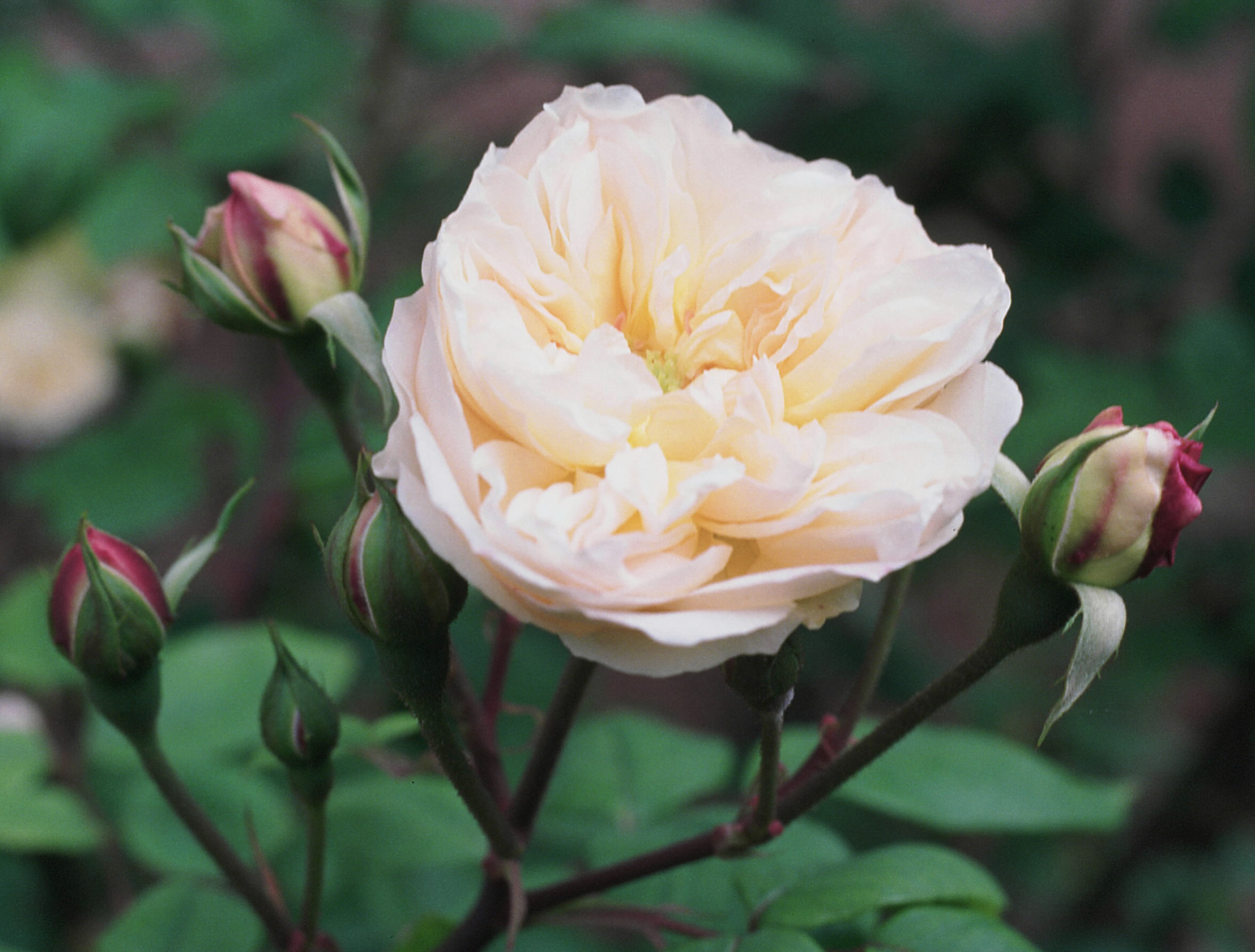
Noisette rose 'Desprez à fleurs jaunes' (Desprez 1830)

The first Noisette rose was raised as a hybrid seedling by a South Carolina rice planter named John Champneys. Its parents were the China rose 'Parson's Pink' and the autumn-flowering musk rose (Rosa moschata), resulting in a vigorous climbing rose producing huge clusters of small pink flowers from spring to fall. Champneys sent seedlings of his rose (called 'Champneys' Pink Cluster') to his gardening friend, Philippe Noisette, who in turn sent plants to his brother Louis in Paris, who then introduced 'Blush Noisette' in 1817. The first Noisettes were small-blossomed, fairly winter-hardy climbers, but later infusions of Tea rose genes created a Tea-Noisette subclass with larger flowers, smaller clusters, and considerably reduced winter hardiness. Examples: 'Blush Noisette', 'Lamarque' (Noisette); 'Mme. Alfred Carriere', 'Marechal Niel' (Tea-Noisette). (See French and German articles on Noisette roses)

==== Hybrid perpetual ====
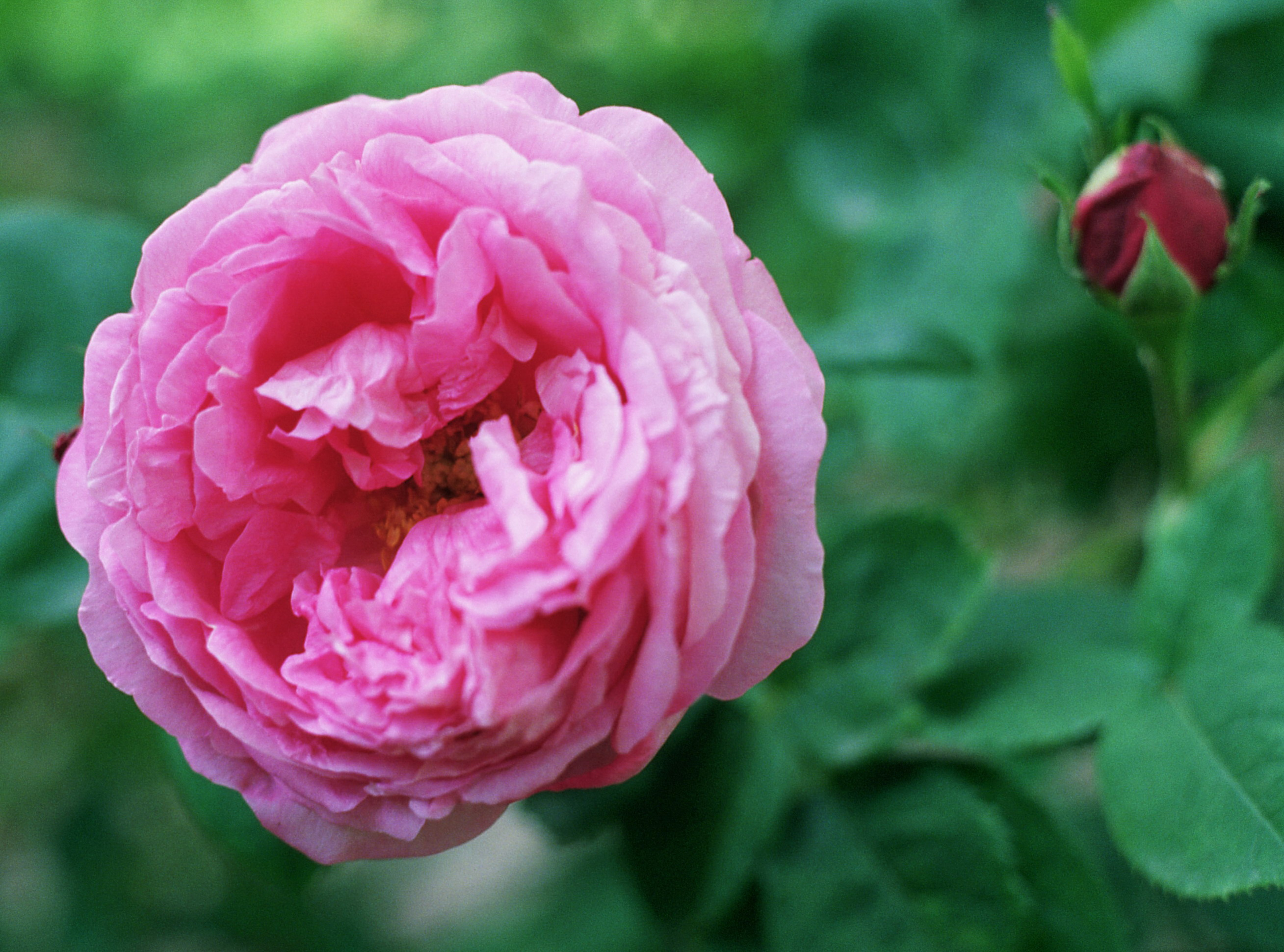
Hybrid perpetual rose 'La Reine' (Laffay 1844)

The dominant class of roses in Victorian England, hybrid perpetuals, their name being a misleading translation of "hybrides remontants" ("reblooming hybrids"), emerged in 1838 as the first roses which successfully combined Asian remontancy (repeat blooming) with the old European lineages. Because remontancy is a recessive trait, the first generation of Asian and European crosses, i. e., hybrid Chinas, hybrid bourbons, and hybrid noisettes, were stubbornly non-remontant, but when these roses were re-crossed with themselves or with Chinas or teas, some of their offspring flowered more than once. The hybrid perpetuals thus were something of a miscellaneous, catch-all class derived to a great extent from the bourbons but with admixtures of Chinas, teas, damasks, gallicas, and to a lesser extent noisettes, albas, and even centifolias. They became the most popular garden and florist roses of northern Europe at the time, as the tender tea roses would not thrive in cold climates, and the hybrid perpetuals' very large blooms were well suited to the new phenomenon of competitive exhibitions. The "perpetual" in the name suggests their remontancy, but many varieties of this class only poorly exhibited the property; the tendency was for a massive vernal bloom followed by either scattered summer flowering, a smaller autumnal burst, or sometimes no re-flowering in that year. Due to a limited colour palette of white, pink, and red, and a lack of reliable remontancy, the hybrid perpetuals were finally overshadowed by their descendants, the hybrid teas. Examples include 'Général Jacqueminot', 'Ferdinand Pichard', 'Paul Neyron', and 'Reine des Violettes'.

==== Hybrid musk ====
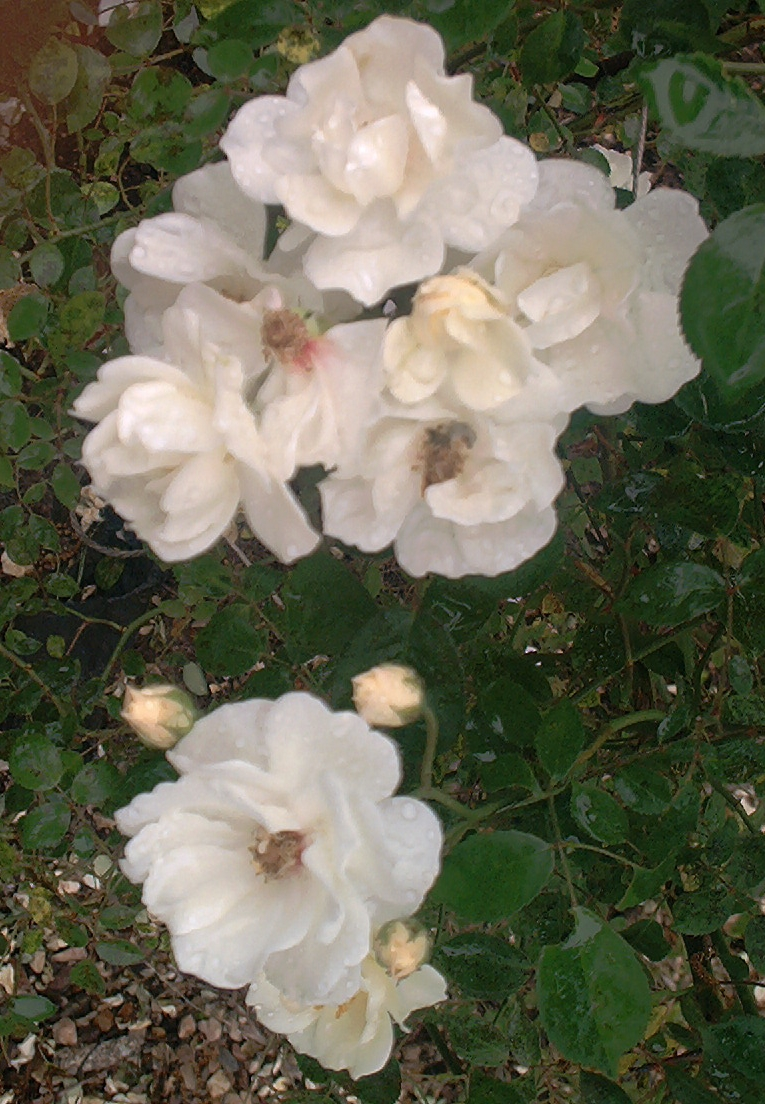
Hybrid musk rose 'Moonlight' (Pemberton 1913)

Although they arose too late to qualify technically as old garden roses, the hybrid musks are often informally classed with them, since their growth habits and care are much more like the old garden roses than modern roses. The hybrid musk group was mainly developed by Rev. Joseph Pemberton, a British rosarian, in the first decades of the 20th century, based upon 'Aglaia', an 1896 cross by Peter Lambert. A seedling of this rose, 'Trier', is considered to the foundation of the class. The genetics of the class are somewhat obscure, as some of the parents are unknown. Rosa multiflora, however, is known to be one parent, and Rosa moschata (the musk rose) also figures in its heritage, though it is considered to be less important than the name would suggest. Hybrid musks are disease-resistant, repeat flowering and generally cluster-flowered, with a strong, characteristic "musk" scent. The stems tend to be lax and arching, with limited thorns. Examples include 'Buff Beauty' and 'Penelope'.

==== Hybrid rugosa ====
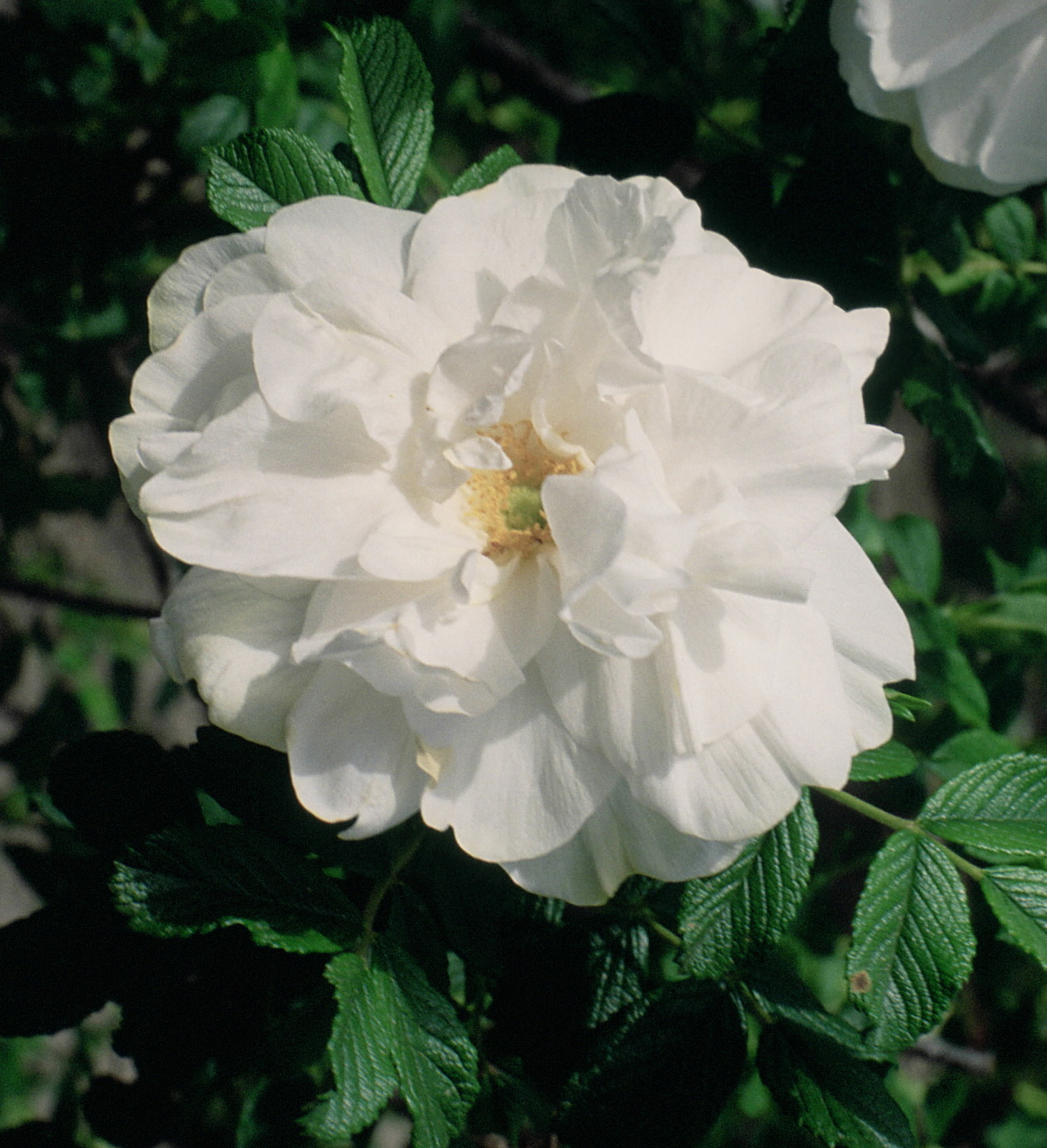
Rugosa rose 'Blanc Double de Coubert' (Cochet 1893)

The hybrid rugosas likewise are not officially old garden roses, but tend to be included in them. Derived from Rosa rugosa ("Japanese rose"), native to Japan and Korea and introduced into the West circa the 1880s, these vigorous roses are extremely hardy with excellent disease resistance. Most are extremely fragrant, remontant, and produce moderately double, flat flowers. The defining characteristic of a hybrid rugosa rose is its rugose, i. e., wrinkly foliage, but some hybrid rugosas lack this trait. These roses often set large hips. Examples include 'Hansa' and 'Roseraie de l'Haÿ'.

==== Bermuda "Mystery" roses ====
This is a group of several dozen "found" roses grown in Bermuda for at least a century. The roses have significant value and interest for those growing roses in tropical and semi-tropical regions, since they are highly resistant to both nematode damage and the fungal diseases that plague rose culture in hot, humid areas. Most of these roses are thought to be Old Garden Rose cultivars that have otherwise dropped out of cultivation, or sports thereof. They are "mystery roses" because their "proper" historical names have been lost. Tradition dictates that they are named after the owner of the garden where they were rediscovered.

==== Miscellaneous ====
There are also a few smaller classes (such as Scots, Sweet Brier) and some climbing classes of old roses (including Ayrshire, Climbing China, Laevigata, Sempervirens, Boursault, Climbing Tea, and Climbing Bourbon). Those classes with both climbing and shrub forms are often grouped together.

=== Modern garden roses ===
Classification of modern roses can be quite confusing because many modern roses have old garden roses in their ancestry and their form varies so much. The classifications tend to be by growth and flowering characteristics. The following includes the most notable and popular classifications of Modern Garden Roses:

==== Hybrid tea ====
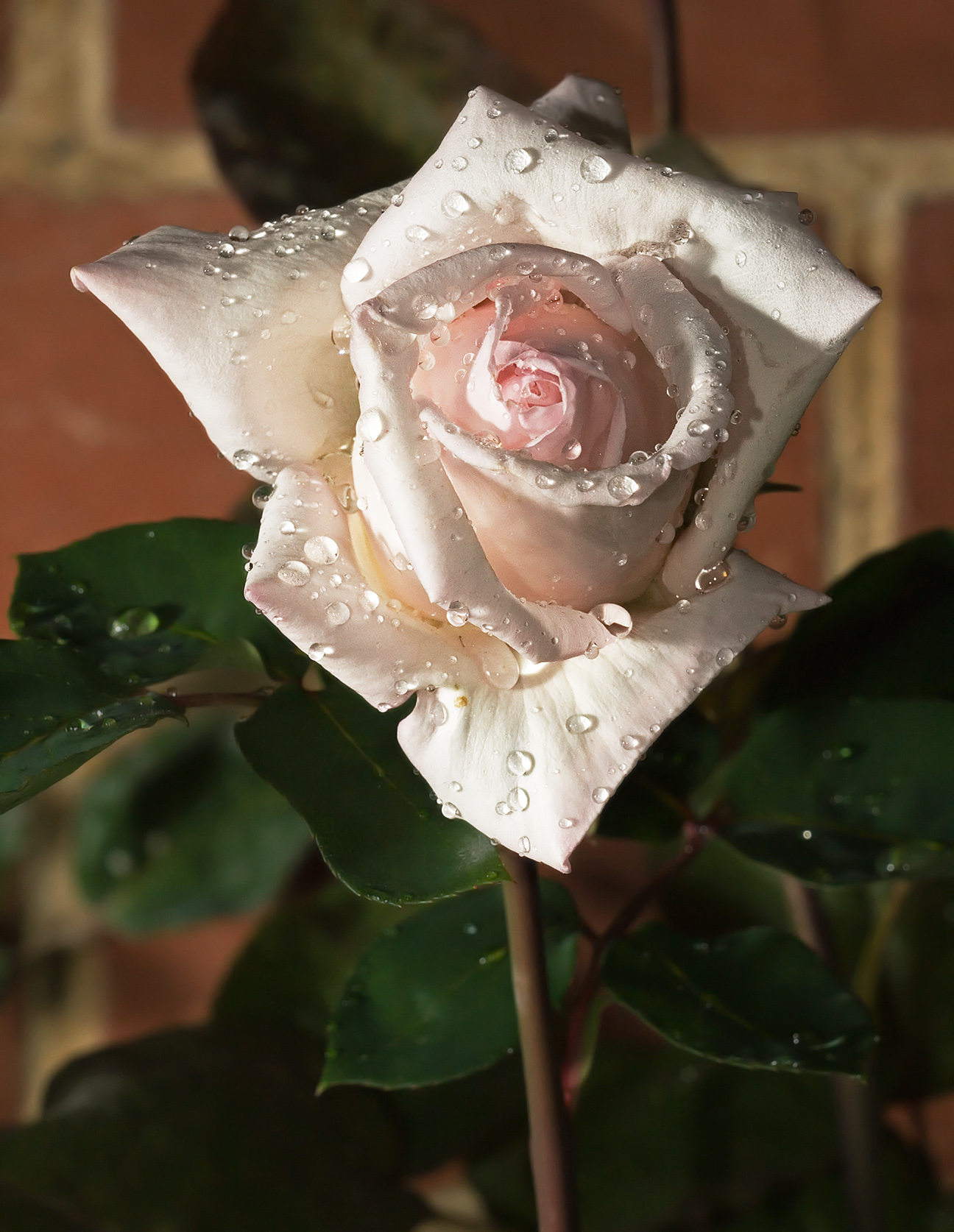
A 'Memoriam' hybrid tea rose (von Abrams 1962)

The favourite rose for much of the history of modern roses, hybrid teas were initially created by hybridising hybrid perpetuals with Tea roses in the late 19th century. 'La France', created in 1867, is universally acknowledged as the first indication of a new class of roses. Hybrid teas exhibit traits midway between both parents: hardier than the teas but less hardy than the hybrid perpetuals, and more ever-blooming than the hybrid perpetuals but less so than the teas. The flowers are well-formed with large, high-centred buds, and each flowering stem typically terminates in a single shapely bloom. The shrubs tend to be stiffly upright and sparsely foliaged, which today is often seen as a liability because it makes them more difficult to place in the garden or landscape. Hybrid teas became the single most popular garden rose of the 20th century; today, their reputation as high maintenance plants has led to a decline in popularity. The hybrid tea remains the standard rose of the floral industry, however, and is still favoured in formal situations. Examples: 'Peace' (yellow), 'Garden Party' (white), 'Mister Lincoln' (red) and 'Double Delight' (bi-colour cream and red).

==== Pernetiana ====
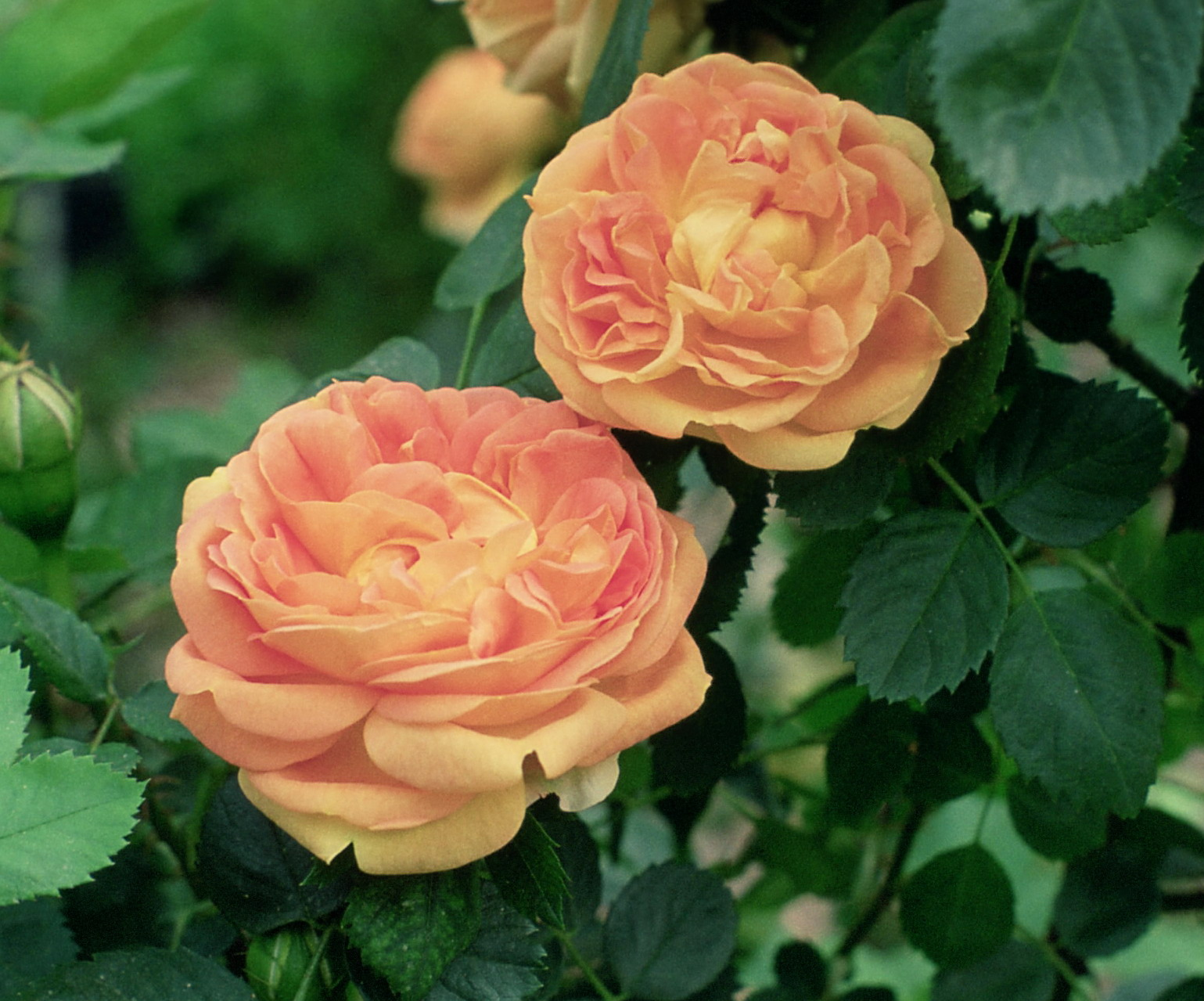
Pernetiana rose 'Soleil d'Or', the first of its class (Pernet 1900)

The French breeder Joseph Pernet-Ducher initiated the first class of roses to include genes from the old Austrian briar rose (Rosa foetida) with his 1900 introduction of 'Soleil d'Or' This resulted in an entirely new colour range for roses: shades of deep yellow, apricot, copper, orange, true scarlet, yellow bicolours, lavender, gray, and even brown were now possible. Originally considered a separate class, the Pernetianas or Hybrid Foetidas were officially merged into the Hybrid Teas in 1930. The new colour range did much to increase hybrid tea popularity in the 20th century, but these colours came at a price: Rosa foetida also passed on a tendency toward disease-susceptibility, scentless blooms, and an intolerance of pruning to its descendants.

==== Polyantha ====
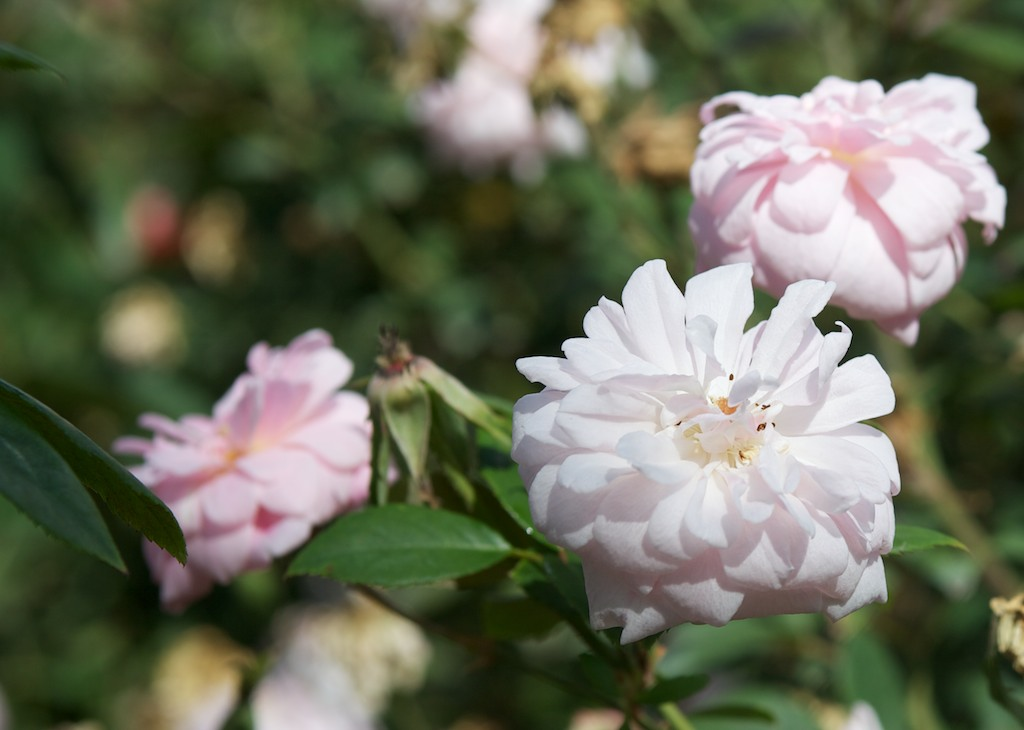
'Cecile Brunner'

The name of this class literally means "many-flowered", from the Greek "poly" ("many") and "anthos" ("flower"). Originally derived from crosses between two East Asian species, Rosa chinensis and Rosa multiflora, polyanthas first appeared in France in the late 19th century alongside the hybrid teas. They are short plants, some compact and others spreading in habit, producing tiny blooms (2.5 cm or 1 inch in diameter on average) in large sprays in the typical rose colours of white, pink, and red. Their popularity derived from their prolific blooming: from spring to autumn; a healthy polyantha shrub truly might be covered in flowers, making a strong colour impact in the landscape.

Polyantha roses are still popular and regarded as low-maintenance, disease-resistant, garden roses. The class of roses denominated "Multiflora Hybrids" are probably cognizable as polyanthas. Examples include Rosa 'Cécile Brünner', 'Perle d'Or', 'Pink Fairy', and 'Red Fairy'.

==== Floribunda ====
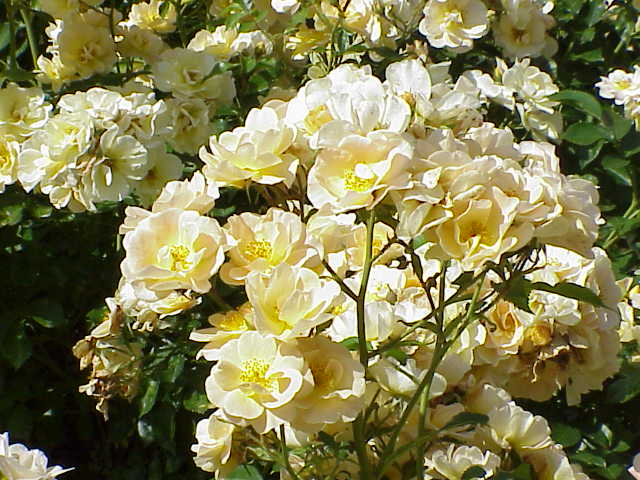
Rosa 'Borussia', a modern floribunda rose

Some rose breeders recognized potential in crossing polyanthas with hybrid teas, to create roses that bloomed with the profusion of polyanthas and possessed the floral beauty and breadth of coloration of hybrid teas. In 1907, the Danish breeder Dines Poulsen introduced the first cross of a polyantha and hybrid tea, denominated 'Rödhätte'. This hybrid had some characteristics of both of its parental classes, and was denominated a "Hybrid Polyantha" or "Poulsen" rose. Further and similar introductions followed from Poulsen, these often bearing the family name, e. g., 'Else Poulsen' (1924). Because their hybrid characteristics separated them from polyanthas and hybrid teas, the new class eventually was named Floribunda, Latin for "many-flowering". Typical floribundas are stiff shrubs that are smaller and bushier than the average hybrid tea, but less dense and sprawling than the average polyantha. The flowers are often smaller than those of hybrid teas but are produced in large sprays that give a better floral effect in the garden. Floribundas are found in all hybrid tea colours and often with the classic, hybrid tea-shaped blossom. Sometimes they differ from hybrid teas only in their cluster flowered habit. They are still planted in large bedding schemes in public parks and suitable gardens. Examples include 'Anne Harkness', 'George Burns', 'Iceberg', and 'Gene Boerner'.

==== Grandiflora ====
Grandifloras, Latin for "large-flowered", are the class of roses created in the middle of the 20th century as back crosses of hybrid teas and floribundas that fit neither category, specifically, Rosa 'Queen Elizabeth', which was introduced in 1954. Grandiflora roses are shrubs that are typically larger than both hybrid teas and floribundas and produce flowers that resemble those of hybrid teas and are borne in small clusters of three to five, similar to floribundas. Grandifloras were somewhat popular from circa 1954 into the 1980s, but today they are much less popular than both hybrid teas and floribundas. Examples include: 'Rock & Roll', 'Tournament of Roses', 'Pink Flamingo', and 'Queen Elizabeth'.

==== Miniature ====
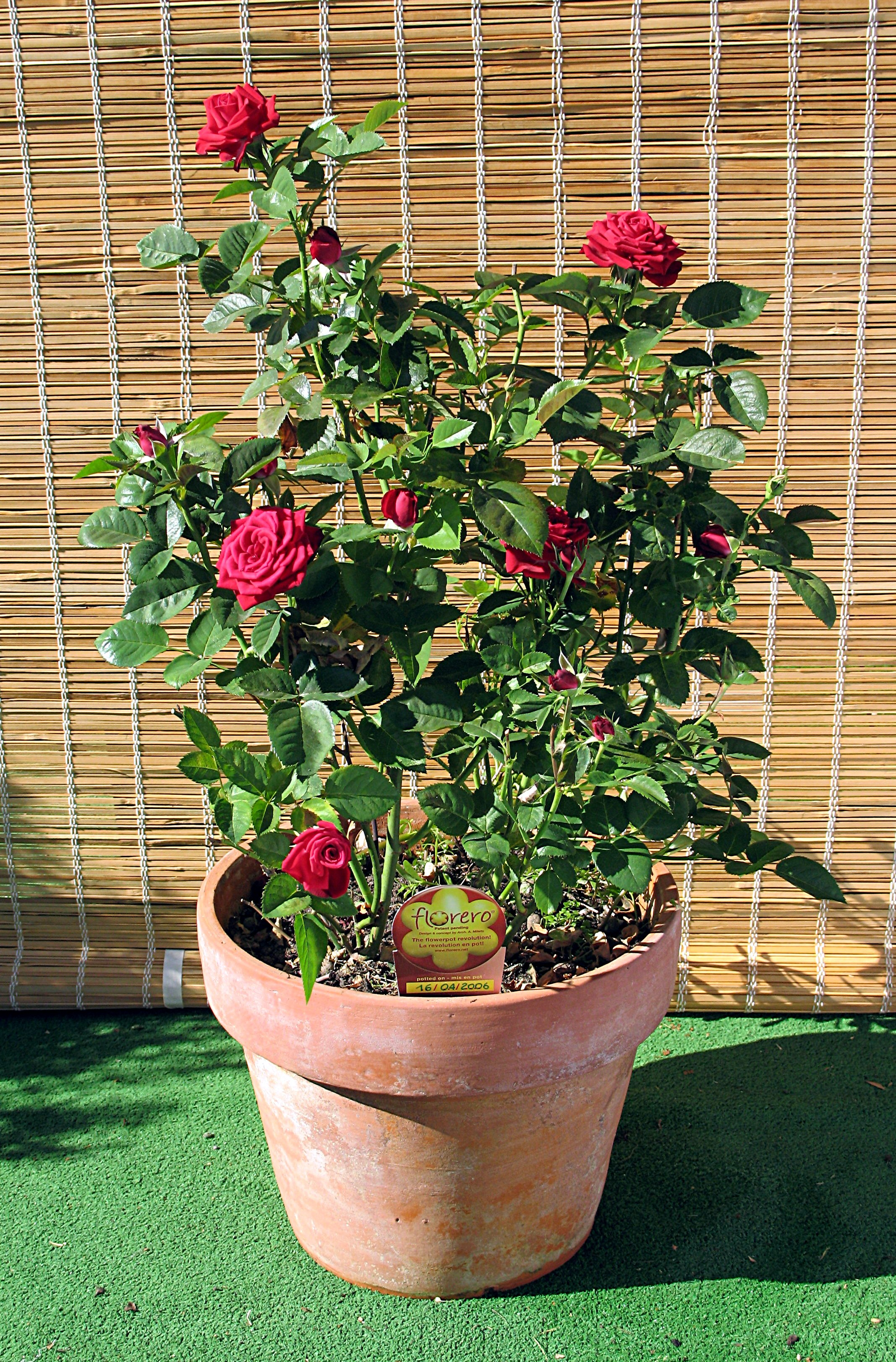
'Meillandine' (a miniature rose) in a terracotta flowerpot

Dwarf mutations of some Old Garden Roses—gallicas and centifolias—were known in Europe in the 17th century, although these were once-flowering just as their larger forms were. Miniature forms of repeat-flowering China roses were also grown and bred in China, and are depicted in 18th-century Chinese art. Modern miniature roses largely derive from such miniature China roses, especially the cultivar 'Roulettii', a chance discovery found in a pot in Switzerland.

Miniature roses are generally twiggy, repeat-flowering shrubs ranging from 6" to 36" in height, with most falling in the 12"–24" height range. Blooms come in all the hybrid tea colors; many varieties also emulate the classic high-centered hybrid tea flower shape. Owing to their small stature, they make excellent plants for containers, hanging baskets and window boxes. Miniature roses are often marketed and sold by the floral industry as houseplants, but they grow poorly in the dry air and reduced light of average home and office conditions, and are best reserved for outdoor gardening. (Examples: 'Petite de Hollande' (Miniature Centifolia, once-blooming), 'Cupcake' (Modern Miniature, repeat-blooming). Additional examples: Scentsational, Tropical Twist.

==== Climbing and rambling ====
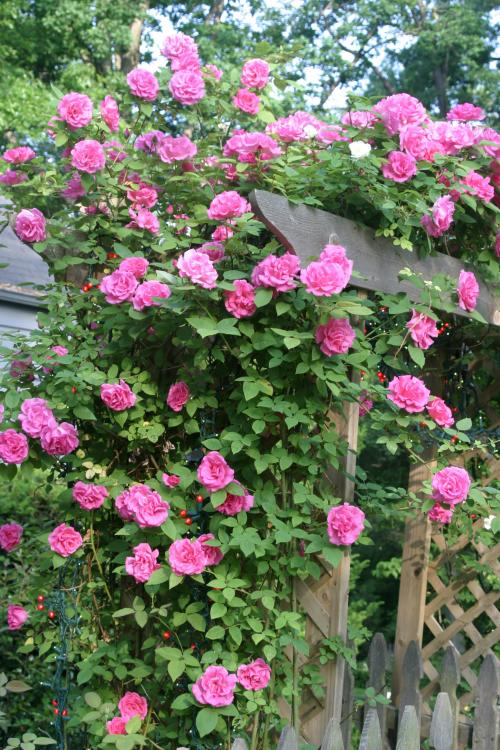
Rosa 'Zéphirine Drouhin', a climbing Bourbon rose (Bizot 1868)

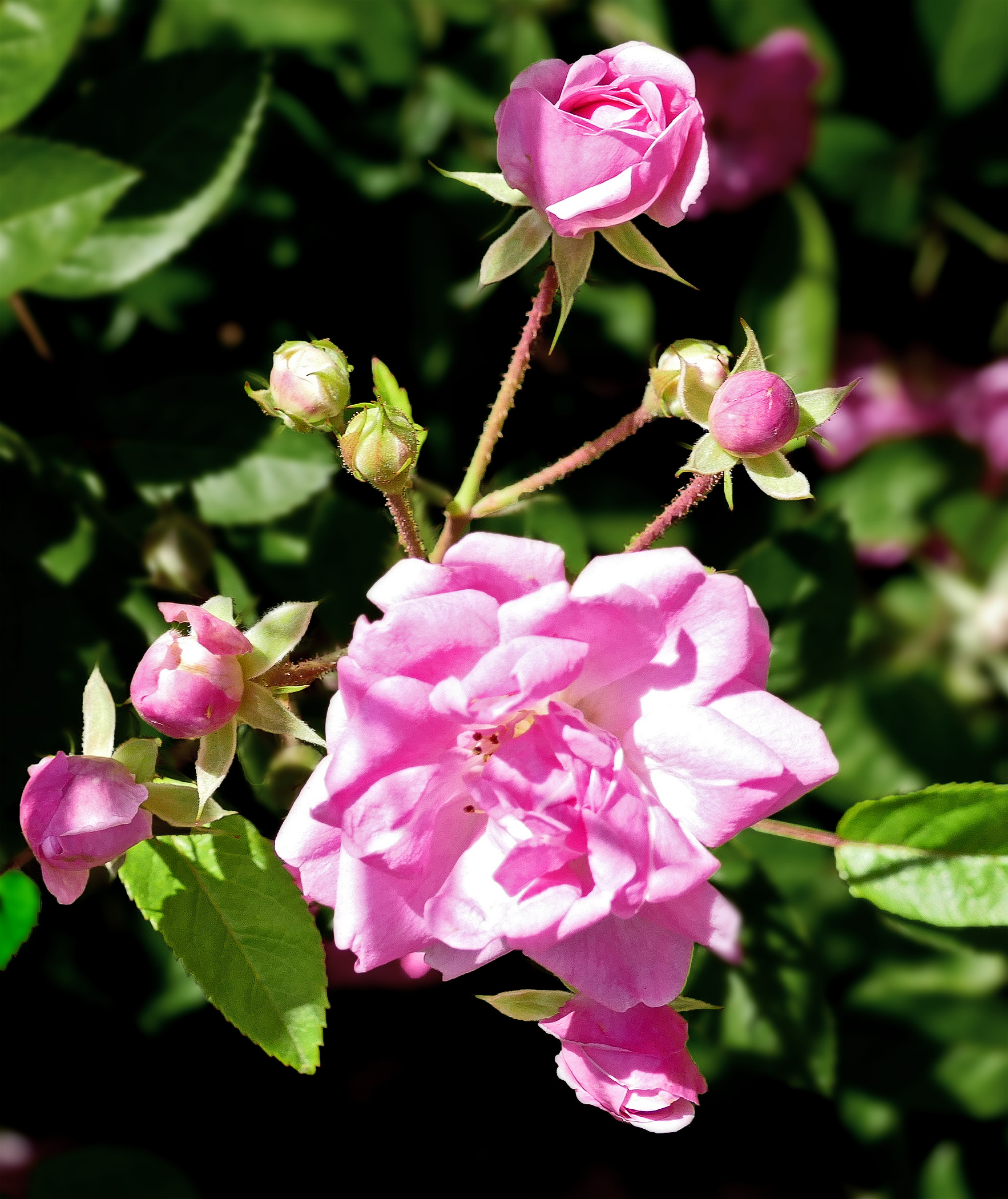
The "Peggy Martin Rose" survived 20 feet of salt water over the garden of Mrs. Peggy Martin, Plaquemines Parish, Louisiana, after Hurricane Katrina. It is a thornless climbing rose.

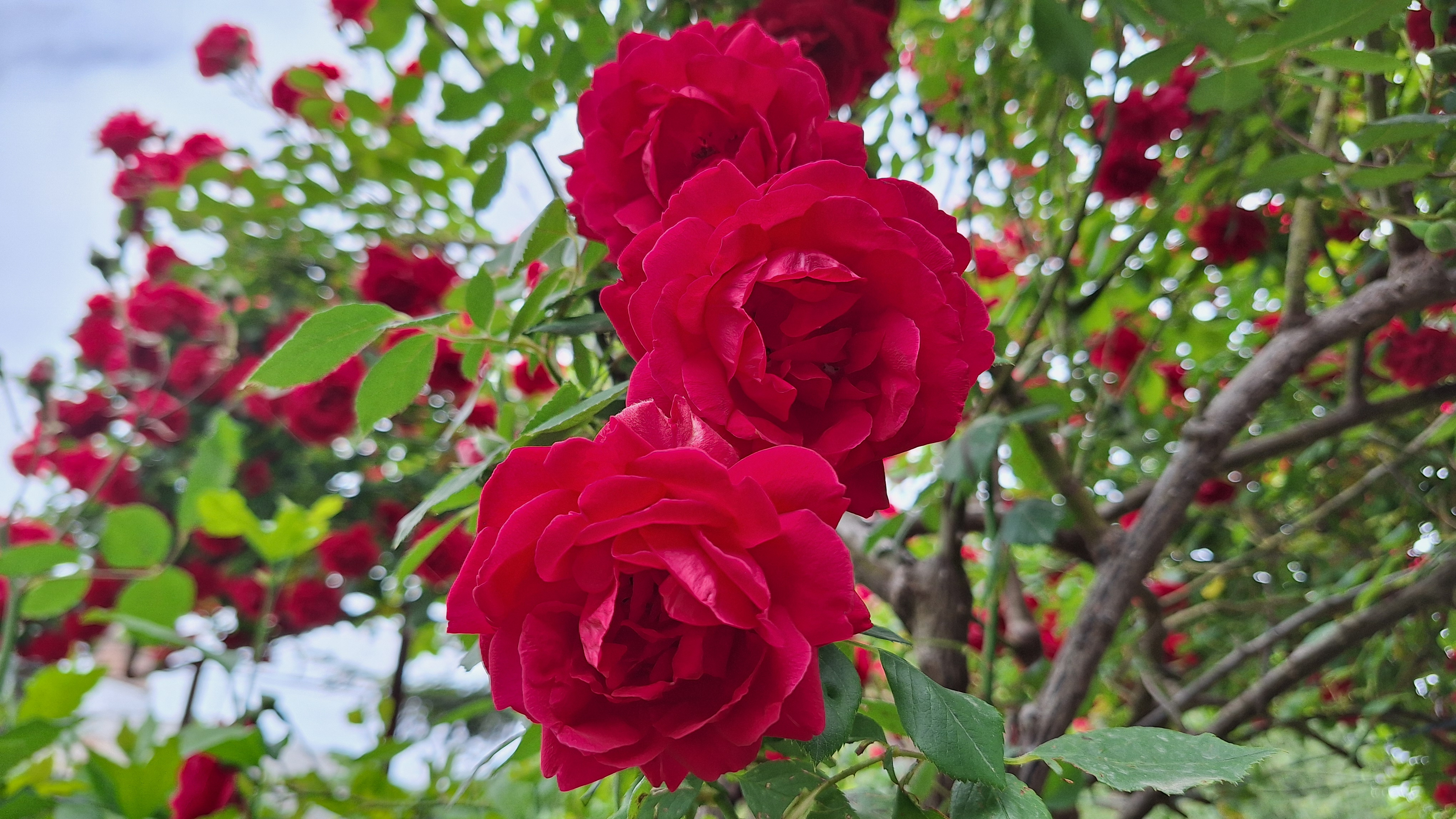
A close view of a climbing rose with bright red blooms

All aforementioned classes of roses, both Old and Modern, have "climbing/arching" forms, whereby the canes of the shrubs grow to be much longer and more flexible than the normal "bush" forms. In the Old Garden Roses, this is often simply the natural growth habit; for many Modern Roses, however, climbing roses are the results of spontaneous mutations. For example, 'Climbing Peace' is designated as a "Climbing Hybrid Tea," for it is genetically identical to the normal "shrub" form of the 'Peace' hybrid tea rose, except that its canes are long and flexible, i. e. "climbing." Most Climbing Roses grow 6–20 feet tall and exhibit repeat blooming.

"Rambler Roses", although technically a separate class, are often included in Climbing Roses. They also exhibit long, flexible canes, but are usually distinguished from true climbers in two ways: a larger overall size (20–30 feet tall is common) and of a once-blooming habit. Climbing and Rambling Roses are not true vines such as ivy, clematis, and wisteria because they lack the ability to cling to supports on their own and must be manually trained and tied over structures, such as arbors and pergolas. Examples include 'American Pillar' (once-blooming rambler), and 'Blaze' (repeat-blooming climber).

One of the most vigorous of the Climbing Roses is the Kiftsgate Rose, Rosa filipes 'Kiftsgate', named after the house garden where Graham Stuart Thomas noticed it in 1951. The original plant is claimed to be the largest rose in the United Kingdom, and has climbed 50 feet high into a copper beech tree.

==== Shrub ====
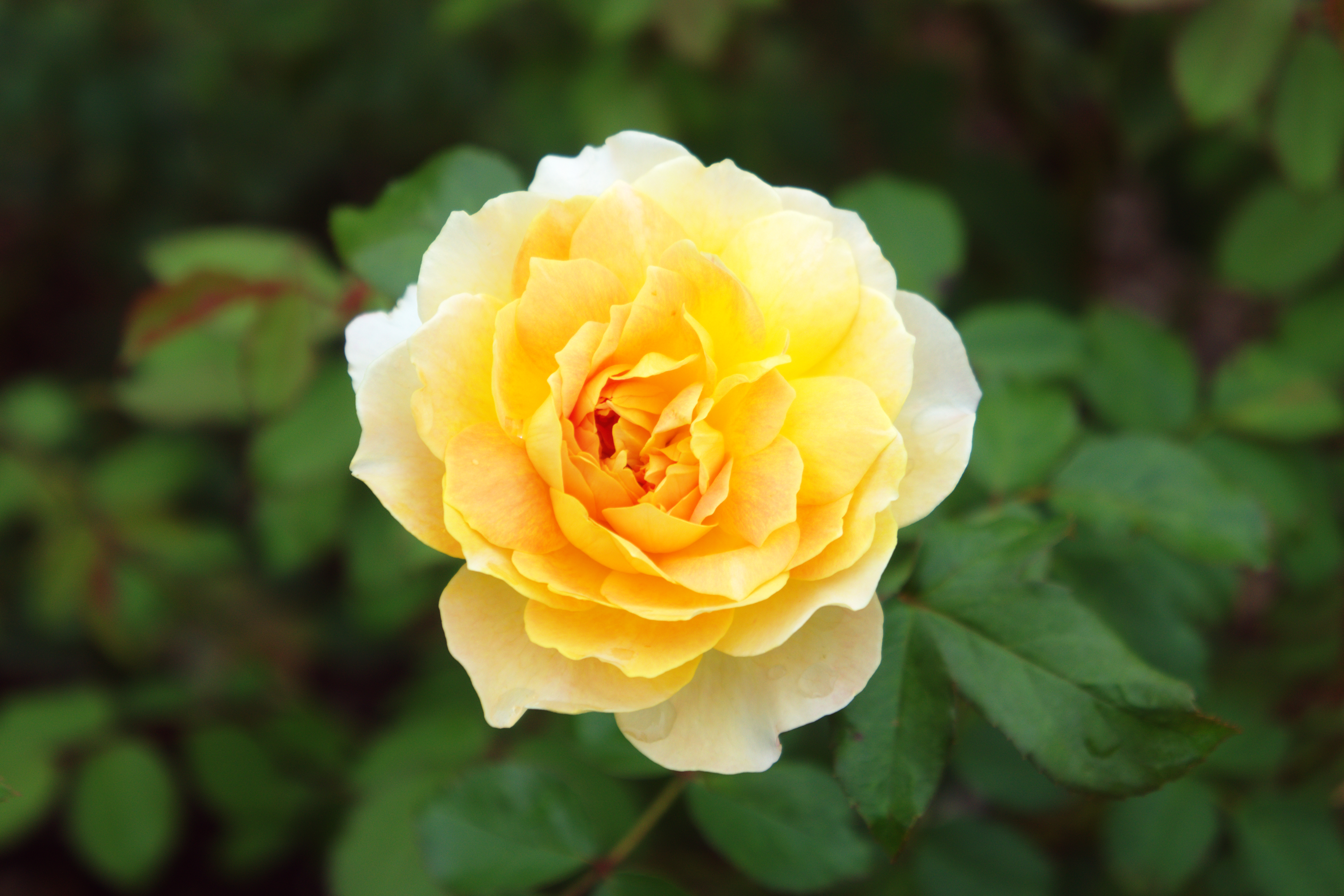
The shrub rose 'Mollineux'

This is not a precisely defined class of garden rose, but it is a description or grouping commonly used by rose reference books and catalogues. It encompasses some old single and repeat flowering cultivars, as well as modern roses that don't fit neatly into other categories. Many cultivars placed in other categories are simultaneously placed in this one. Roses classed as shrubs tend to be robust and of informal habit, making them recommended for use in a mixed shrub border or as hedging.

==== English / David Austin ====
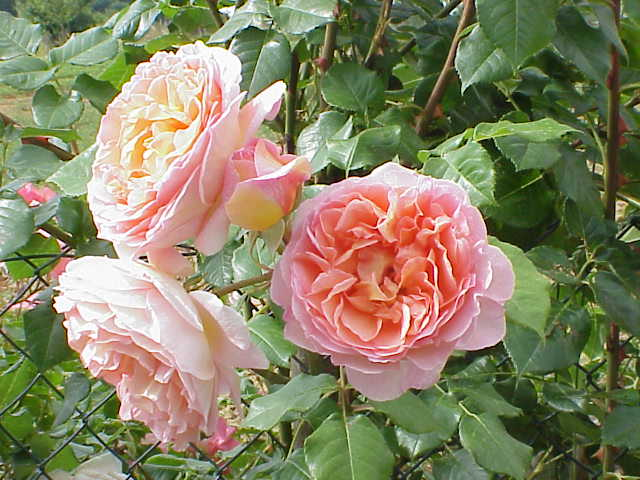
Austin rose 'Abraham Darby' (1985)

Although not officially recognized as a separate class of roses by any established rose authority, English (aka David Austin) roses are often set aside as such by consumers and retailers alike. Development started in the 1960s by David Austin of Shropshire, England, who wanted to rekindle interest in Old Garden Roses by hybridizing them with modern hybrid teas and floribundas. The idea was to create a new group of shrub roses that featured blooms with old-fashioned shapes and fragrances, evocative of classic Gallica, Alba and Damask roses, but with modern repeat-blooming characteristics and the modern expanded color range as well. Austin mostly succeeded in his mission; his tribe of "English" roses, now numbering hundreds of varieties, has been warmly embraced by the gardening public and are widely available to consumers. English roses are still actively developed, with new varieties released annually. The winter hardiness and disease resistance of the classic Old Garden roses has largely been compromised in the process; many English roses are susceptible to the same disease problems that plague modern hybrid teas and floribundas, and many are not hardy north of USDA Zone 5. Examples: 'Charles Austin', 'Graham Thomas', 'Mary Rose', 'Tamora', 'Wife of Bath'.

==== Canadian Hardy ====
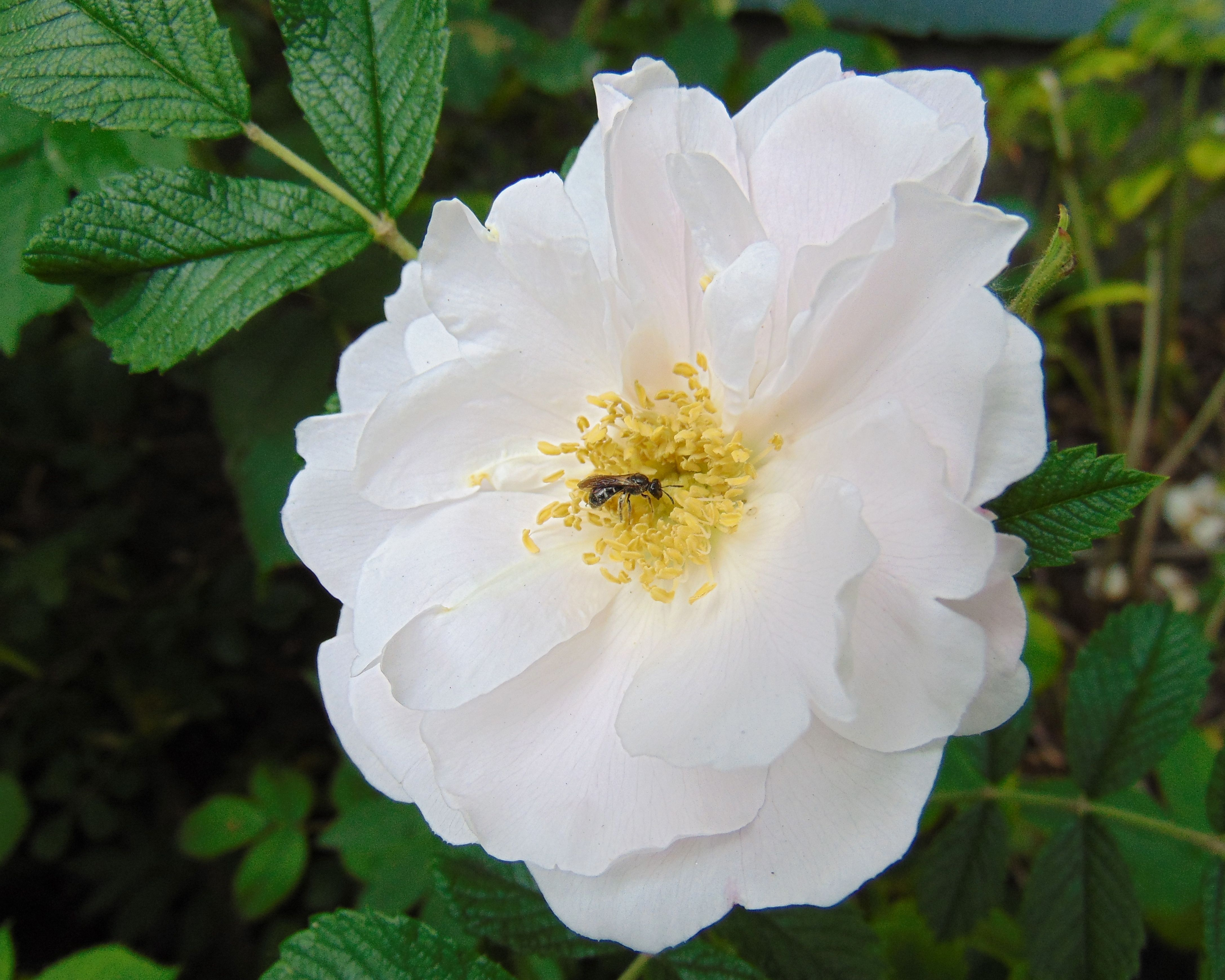
Rosa 'Henry Hudson', one of the Explorer series

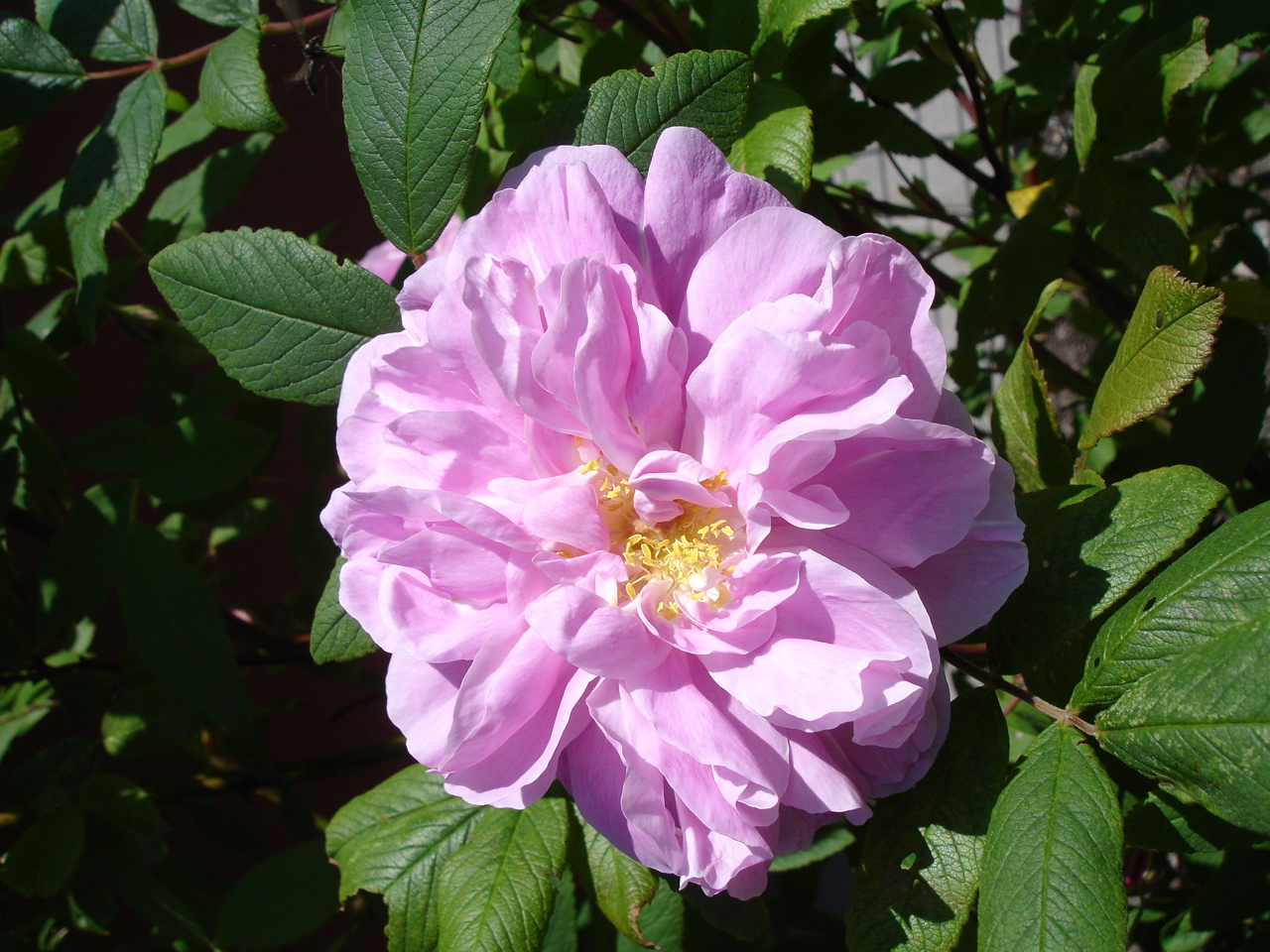
'Thérèse Bugnet', a multi-species hybrid that is still widely available (Bugnet 1950)

Two main lines of roses were developed for the extreme weather conditions of Canadian winters by Agriculture Canada at the Morden Research Station in Morden, Manitoba and the Experimental Farm in Ottawa (and later at L'Assomption, Québec). They are called the Explorer series and the Parkland series. Derived mostly from crosses of Rosa rugosa or the native Canadian species Rosa arkansana with other species, these plants are extremely tolerant of cold weather, some down to −35C. All have repeat bloom. A wide diversity of forms and colours were achieved.

Dr. Felicitas Svejda, who led the rose-breeding program at the Central Experimental Farm in Ottawa for nearly 25 years, developed the Explorer Rose Series named in honour of Canadian explorers. Many of her roses also thrive in Finland, Russia, Iceland, Germany and Austria. Popular roses from the series include: 'Martin Frobisher', 'Jens Munk' (1974), 'Henry Hudson' (1976), 'John Cabot' (1978), 'Charles Albanel' (1982), 'William Baffin' (1983), 'Henry Kelsey' (1984), 'Alexander MacKenzie' (1985), 'John Davis' (1986), and 'Captain Samuel Holland' (1992).

Roses in the Parkland series include 'Morden Centennial', 'Morden Sunrise, 'Winnipeg Parks' and 'Cuthbert Grant'. Two roses named after Canadian artists that have been added are 'Emily Carr' and 'Felix Leclerc'.

Other notable Canadian breeders include Frank Skinner, Percy Wright, Isabella Preston, Georges Bugnet and Robert Erskine.

==== Landscape (Ground Cover) ====
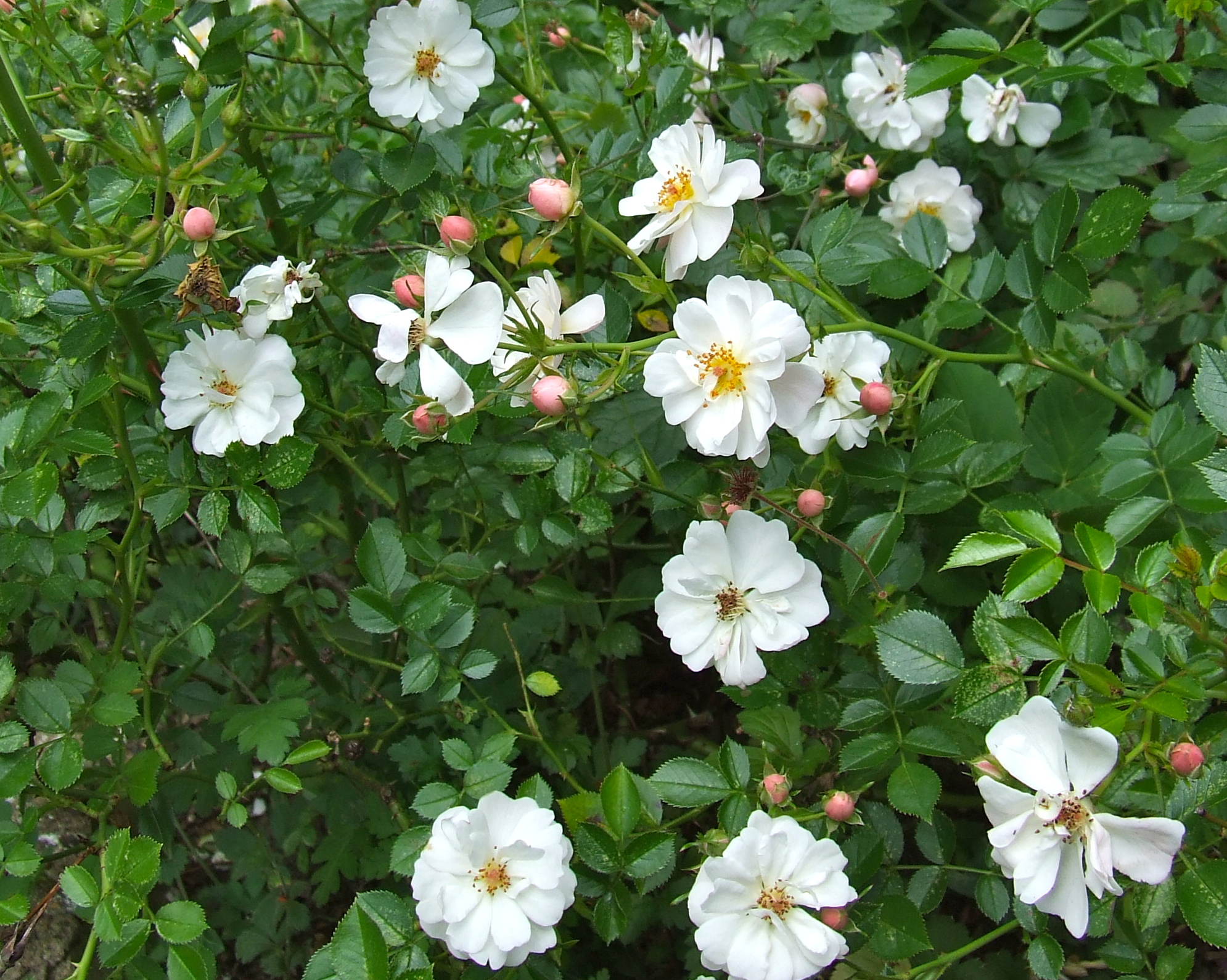
'Avon', a ground cover rose introduced by Poulson in 1992

This type of rose was developed mainly for mass amenity planting. In the late 20th century, traditional hybrid tea and floribunda rose varieties fell out of favour with many gardeners and landscapers, as they are often labour and chemical intensive plants susceptible to pest and disease problems. So-called "landscape" roses (also known as "ground cover" roses) have thus been developed to fill the consumer desire for a garden rose that offers colour, form and fragrance, but is also low maintenance and easy to care for. Most have the following characteristics:

- Lower growing habit, usually under 60 cm (24 inches)
- Repeat flowering
- Disease and pest resistance
- Growing on their own roots.
- Minimal pruning requirements

Principal parties involved in the breeding of new varieties include: Werner Noak (Germany), Meidiland Roses (France), Boot & Co. (Netherlands), and William Radler (US).

==== Patio ====
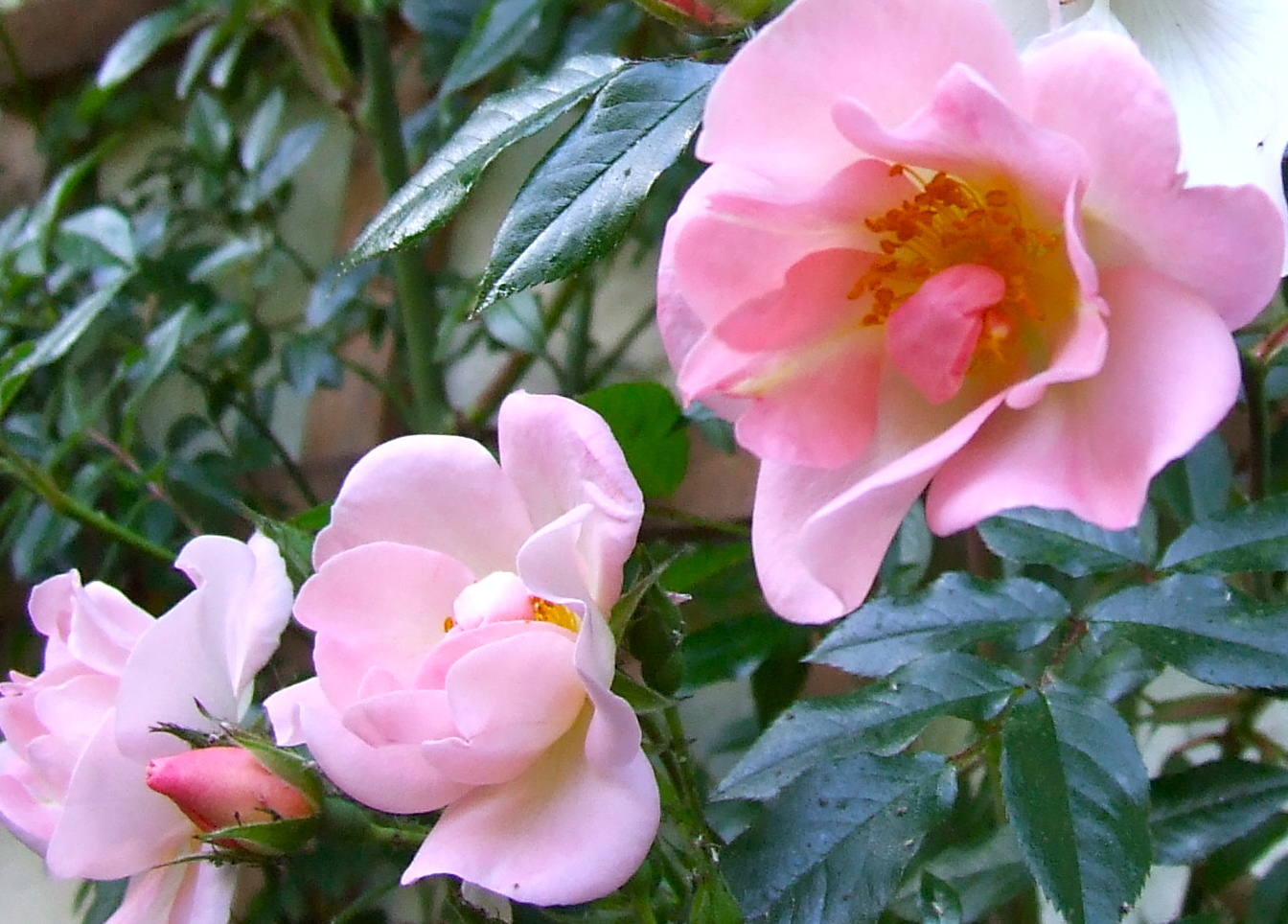
Chris Warner's patio climber 'Open Arms' (1995)

Since the 1970s many rose breeders have focused on developing compact roses (typically 1'–4' in height and spread) that are suitable for smaller gardens, terraces and containers. These combine characteristics of larger miniature roses and smaller floribundas—resulting in the rather loose classification "patio roses", called Minifloras in North America. D. G. Hessayon says the description "patio roses" emerged after 1996. Some rose catalogues include older polyanthas that have stood the test of time (e.g., 'Nathalie Nypels', 'Baby Faurax') within their patio selection. Rose breeders, notably Chris Warner in the UK and the Danish firm of Poulson (under the name of Courtyard Climbers) have also created patio climbers, small rambler style plants that flower top-to-toe and are suitable for confined areas. It is suggested patio style roses are protected during winter months due to the exposure environment.

== Cultivation ==
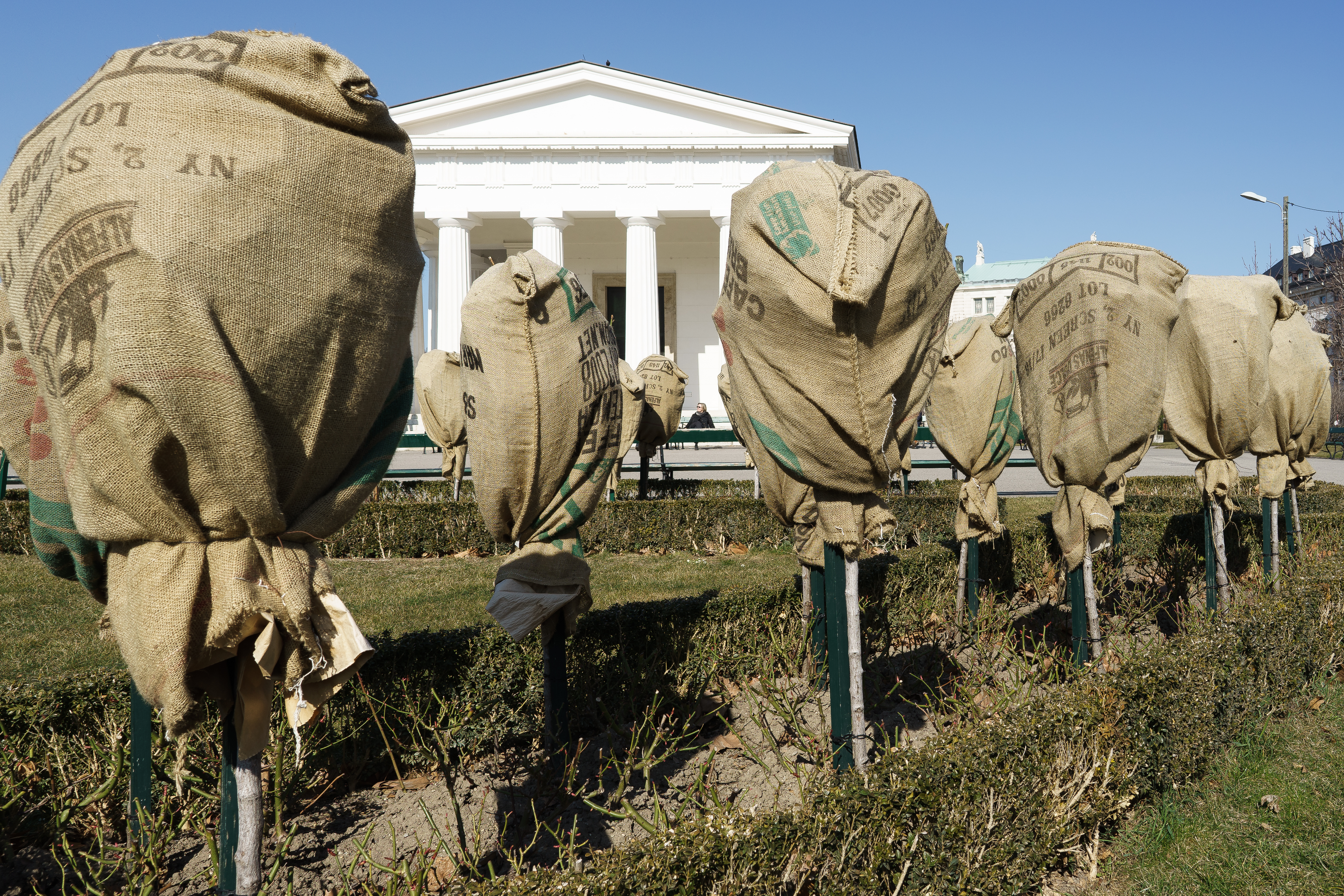
Standard roses with winter protection against freezing, Vienna

In the garden, roses are grown as bushes, shrubs or climbers. "Bushes" are usually comparatively low growing, often quite upright in habit, with multiple stems emerging near ground level; they are often grown formally in beds with other roses. "Shrubs" are usually larger and have a more informal or arching habit, and may additionally be placed in a mixed border or grown separately as specimens. Certain bush hybrids (and smaller shrubs) may also be grown as "standards", which are plants grafted high (typically 1 metre or more) on a rose rootstock, resulting in extra height which can make a dominant feature in a floral display. Climbing roses are usually trained to a suitable support.

Roses are commonly propagated by grafting onto a rootstock, which provides sturdiness and vigour, or (especially with Old Garden Roses) they may be propagated from hardwood cuttings and allowed to develop their own roots.

Most roses thrive in temperate climates. Those based on warm climate Asian species do well in their native sub-tropical environments. Certain species and cultivars can even flourish in tropical climates, especially when grafted onto appropriate rootstocks. Most garden roses prefer rich soil which is well-watered but well-drained, and perform best in well-lit positions which receive several hours of sun a day (although some climbers, some species and most Hybrid Musks will tolerate shade). Standard roses require staking.

=== Pruning ===
Rose pruning, sometimes regarded as a horticultural art form, is largely dependent on the type of rose to be pruned, the reason for pruning, and the time of year it is at the time of the desired pruning.

Most Old Garden Roses of strict European heritage (albas, damasks, gallicas, etc.) are shrubs that bloom once yearly, in late spring or early summer, on two-year-old (or older) canes. Their pruning requirements are quite minimal because removal of branches will remove next year's flower buds. Hence pruning is usually restricted to just removing weak and spent branches, plus light trimming (if necessary) to reduce overall size.

Modern hybrids, including the hybrid teas, floribundas, grandifloras, modern miniatures, and English roses, have a complex genetic background that almost always includes China roses (which are descended from Rosa chinensis). China roses were evergrowing, everblooming roses from humid subtropical regions that bloomed constantly on any new vegetative growth produced during the growing season. Their modern hybrid descendants exhibit similar habits; unlike Old European Roses, modern hybrids bloom continuously (until stopped by frost) on any new canes produced during the growing season. They therefore require pruning back of any spent flowering stem in order to divert the plant's energy into producing new growth and hence new flowers.

Additionally, modern hybrids planted in cold winter climates will almost universally require a "hard" annual pruning (reducing all canes to 8"–12", about 30 cm in height) in early spring. Again, because of their complex China rose background, modern hybrids are typically not as cold hardy as European Old Garden Roses, and low winter temperatures often desiccate or kill exposed canes. In spring, if left unpruned, these damaged canes will often die back all the way to the shrub's root zone, resulting in a weakened, disfigured plant. The annual "hard" pruning of hybrid teas and floribundas is generally done in early spring.

=== Deadheading ===
This is the practice of removing any spent, faded, withered, or discoloured flowers. The purpose is to encourage the plant to focus its energy and resources on forming new shoots and blooms, rather than fruit production. Deadheading may also be performed for aesthetic purposes, if spent flowers are unsightly. Any roses such as Rosa glauca or Rosa moyesii that are grown for their decorative hips should not be deadheaded.

=== Pests and diseases ===
Roses are subject to several diseases. The main fungal diseases affecting the leaves are rose black spot (Diplocarpon rosae), rose rust (Phragmidium mucronatum), rose powdery mildew (Podosphaera pannosa) and rose downy mildew (Peronospora sparsa). Stems can be affected by several canker diseases, the most commonly seen of which is stem canker (Leptosphaeria coniothyrium). Diseases of the root zone include honey fungus (Armillaria spp.), verticillium wilt, and various species of phytophthora.

Fungal leaf diseases affect some cultivars and species more than others. On susceptible plants fungicidal sprays may be necessary to prevent infection or reduce severity of attacks. Cultivation techniques may also be used, such as ensuring good air circulation around a plant. Stem cankers are best treated by pruning out infection as soon as it is noticed. Root diseases are not usually possible to treat once infection has occurred; the most practical line of defence is to ensure that growing conditions maximise plant health and thereby prevent infection. Phytophthora species are waterborne and therefore improving drainage and reducing waterlogging can help reduce infection.

The main pest affecting roses is the aphid (greenfly), which sucks the sap and weakens the plant. In areas where they are endemic Japanese beetles (Popillia japonica) take a heavy toll on rose flowers and foliage; rose blooms can also be destroyed by infestations of thrips (Thysanoptera spp). Roses are also used as food plants by the larvae of some Lepidoptera (butterfly and moth) species; see list of Lepidoptera that feed on roses. Spraying with insecticide of roses is often recommended but if this is done care is needed to minimize the loss of beneficial insects; systemic insecticides have the advantage of only affecting insects which feed on the plants.

== Notable rose growers ==
Some rose growers are known for their particular contributions to the field. These include:

- David Austin nursery, based in Shropshire, UK, is the developer of "English roses", such as 'Constance Spry', 'Mary Rose' and 'Graham Thomas'
- Peter Beales was a specialist in classic and species roses, preserving many old and wild roses at his Norfolk nursery and also introducing 70 new cultivars. He was also the author of several classic books on the subject of roses.
- Joséphine de Beauharnais (Empress Josephine) was the first great collector of roses in the modern Western world, and her horticulturalist André Dupont pioneered the development of new hybrids using controlled pollination at her Malmaison estate. She has been called the godmother of modern rosomaniacs.
- Cants of Colchester, in Essex, is the UK's oldest firm of commercial rose growers. Notable introductions include 'Mrs B.R. Cant' and 'Just Joey'.
- Anne Cocker of James Cocker & Sons, Aberdeen, Scotland. Known for her unusually colored and patterned rose varieties. Her work had a major influence on American hybridizer, Tom Carruth.
- Conard-Pyle Co. introduced the rose 'Peace' to the US and established the marque Star Roses. 'Peace' was bred by Meilland of France (where it was introduced as 'Mme A. Meilland'); Conard-Pyle acted as Meilland's US agents, and the rose was renamed for the US market when it was introduced at the end of the Second World War.
- Dickson Roses, located near Belfast introduced its first roses in 1886, focusing on breeding Hybrid Teas that could stand up to the Irish climate. Successes include 'Shot Silk' and 'Grandpa Dickson' and, more recently, 'Elina' and 'Tequila Sunrise'.
- Pedro Dot put Spanish rose growing on the map and is best known for the shrub 'Nevada' and his work to improve the flower shape of miniature varieties.
- Andre Dupont was a French horticulturalist who pioneered the creation of new rose cultivars through controlled pollination. He was employed by the Empress Josephine to use her collection of roses to create new roses.
- Rudolf Geschwind was an Austro-Hungarian amateur rose breeder who introduced around 140 new varieties, including 'Gruss an Teplitz'. He focused on winter hardiness and vigour.
- Jules Gravereaux, founder of Roseraie de L'Haÿ
- Harkness Roses, in Hertfordshire, UK is best known for 'Ena Harkness' (at one time reputed to be the best-selling red Hybrid Tea in the world and actually bred by amateur rosarian Albert Norman). Other famous introductions include 'Compassion' and 'Margaret Merril'.
- S. Reynolds Hole was Dean of Rochester Cathedral in the UK and the founder of the (Royal) National Rose Society. He organized the first specialty rose show in the UK and published books on rose cultivation, popularizing rose growing and exhibiting.
- Jackson & Perkins is a hugely influential American rose grower. The company's early success was 'Dorothy Perkins', but under Eugene Boerner the focus on developing Floribundas led to many All-America Rose Selection honours.
- W. Kordes' Sons, based in Sparrieshoop in Schleswig-Holstein, Germany, is one of the most innovative rose breeders and growers, and responsible for the early flowering "Frühlings" series, the Kordesii Hybrids and many famous Hybrid Tea and Floribunda roses, including 'Crimson Glory' and 'Iceberg' ('Schneewittchen').
- McGredy, of Northern Ireland, was responsible for 'Evelyn Fison', 'Dublin Bay' and also 'Regensberg', a pioneering 'handpainted' rose. Sam McGredy IV moved to New Zealand in 1974 and focused on hybrid teas and Grandifloras, including 'Paddy Stephens' and 'Kathryn McGredy'.
- The Meilland family, founders of Meilland International (AKA House of Meilland), made its name and fortune with 'Mme A. Meilland' ('Peace'), and has continued to be at the forefront of rose breeding, with varieties such as 'Bonica '82' and 'Swany'.
- Ralph S. Moore, the California-based breeder of more than 500 roses, is known as 'the father of Modern Miniatures' and was a hugely influential figure in the development of commercial approaches to rose hybridization.
- Werner Noack of Germany introduced the Flower Carpet (ground cover/landscape) series.
- Joseph Pemberton was an Anglican clergyman and amateur rosarian who set out to breed 'old fashioned' roses. The resulting hybrid musks include 'Felicia' and 'Penelope'. On his death, the nursery passed to his gardener J.A. Bentall, who produced 'Buff Beauty' and the Polyantha 'The Fairy'.
- Jean Pernet, père was a Lyon nurseryman whose notable roses include the Moss variety 'Louis Gimard' and the hybrid perpetual 'Baronne Adolphe de Rothschild'.
- Joseph Pernet-Ducher was among the first rose breeders to focus on developing the new Hybrid Tea class. His introductions include 'Mme Caroline Testout' and 'Soleil d'Or'- forerunner of 20th-century yellow and orange roses.
- Poulson, the Danish rose dynasty, was established in 1878 and originally focused on breeding roses hardy enough to withstand the Scandinavian climate. Later introductions notable for their form and colour include 'Chinatown' (1963) and 'Ingrid Bergman' (1984). The nursery developed a number of successful ground cover (landscape) roses, including 'Kent' (1988).
- Felicitas Svejda developed roses that could survive Canada's short growing season and harsh winters. She developed the Explorer Rose Series named in honour of Canadian explorers.
- Mathias Tantau is a rose breeding company located at Uetersen, Germany. Founded in 1906, it has introduced some 350 cultivars and is responsible for popular roses such as 'Super Star' (1960), 'Fragrant Cloud' (1963), and 'Black Magic' (1997).
- Graham Stuart Thomas is best known for reawakening interest in old garden roses, but also ensured commercial introductions in the wild rose style, including 'Bobbie James' and 'Souvenir de St Anne's'.
- Walter Van Fleet worked for the US Department of Agriculture, focusing on crops, but also developing roses designed to thrive in the American climate. His introductions include 'American Pillar' and 'Dr W. Van Fleet'. After his death, his seedlings – including 'Mary Wallace', 'Breeze Hill' and 'Glenn Dale' – were introduced by the American Rose Society as 'dooryard climbers'.
- Jean-Pierre Vibert was a prolific early rose hybridizer, responsible for many older roses still found in gardens today. 'Aimee Vibert' (1828), one of his Noisettes, was named for his daughter.
- Weeks Roses (with Tom Carruth) is a California rose company that has focused on innovations in colour, form and vigour. Its roses include 'Night Time', 'Stainless Steel', 'Fourth of July' and 'Hot Cocoa'.

== Gallery ==
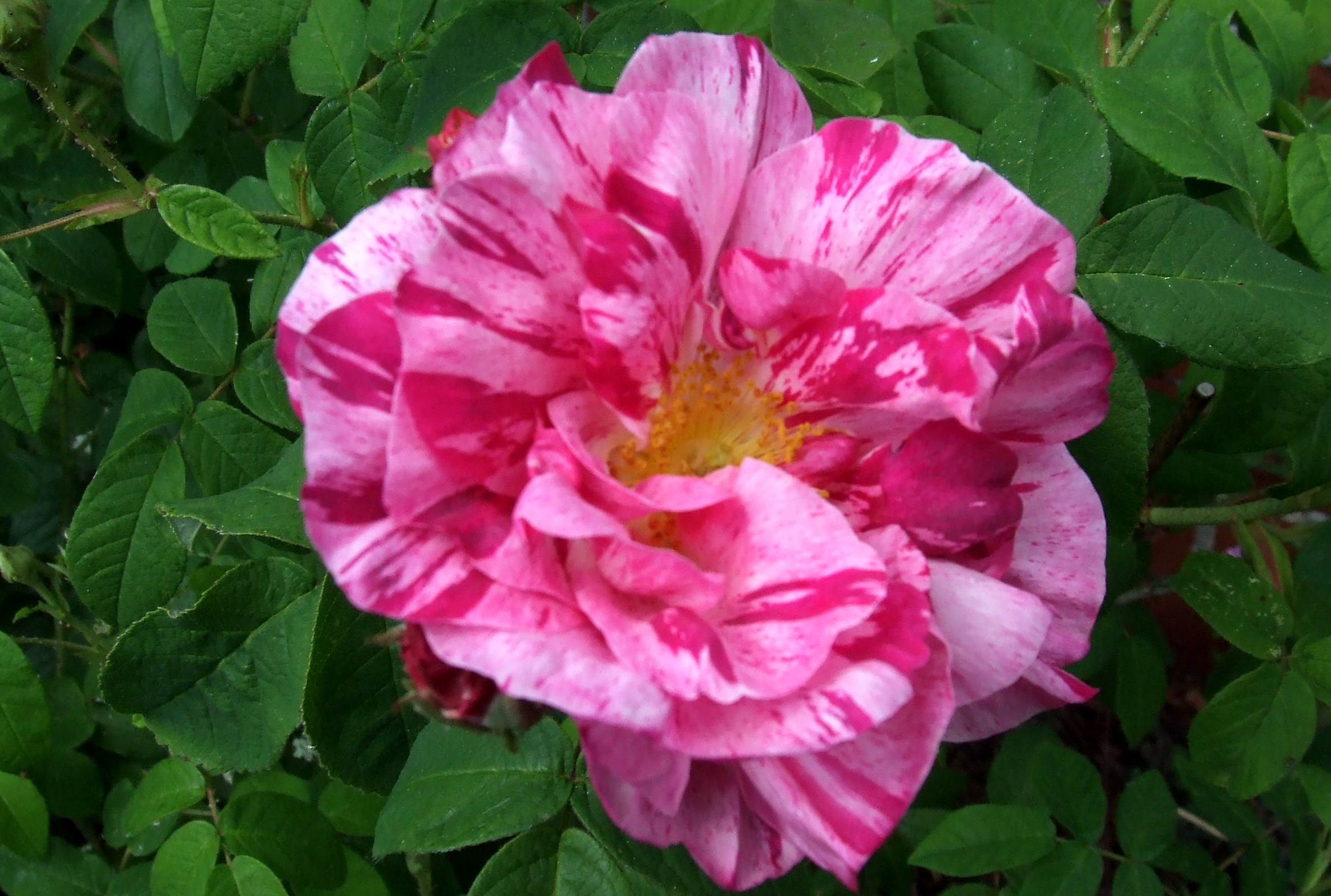
Striped Gallica 'Rosa Mundi', believed to date from the 12th century

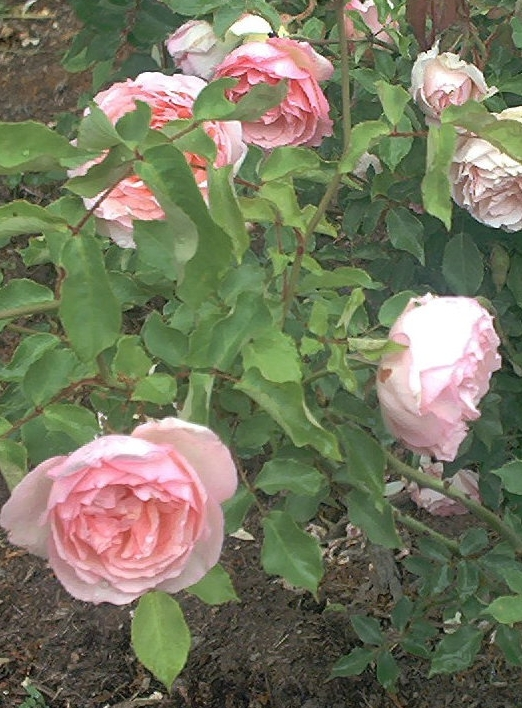
Tea Rose 'Duchesse de Brabant' (Bernède, 1857)

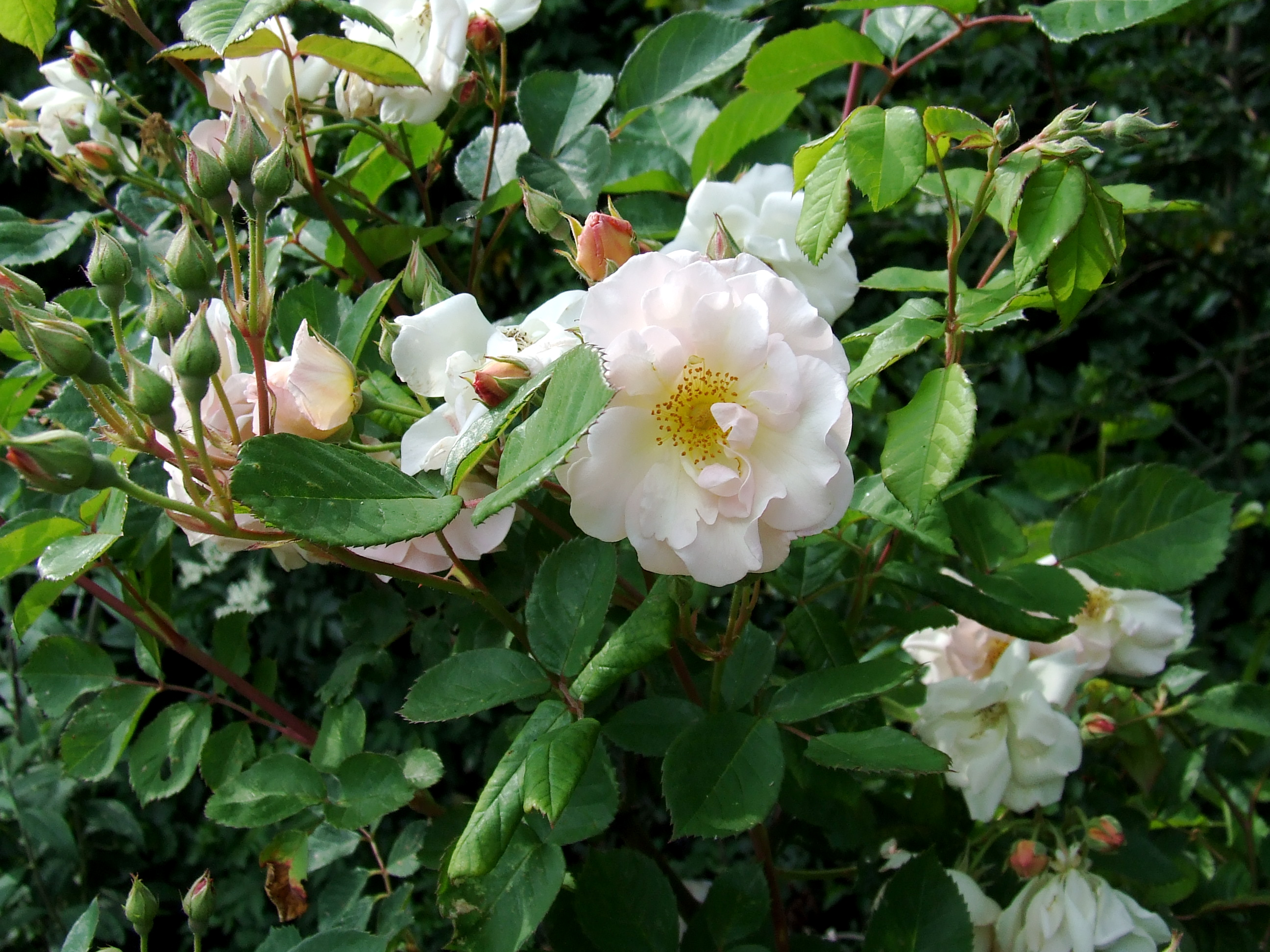
Hybrid Musk 'Penelope' (Pemberton, 1924)

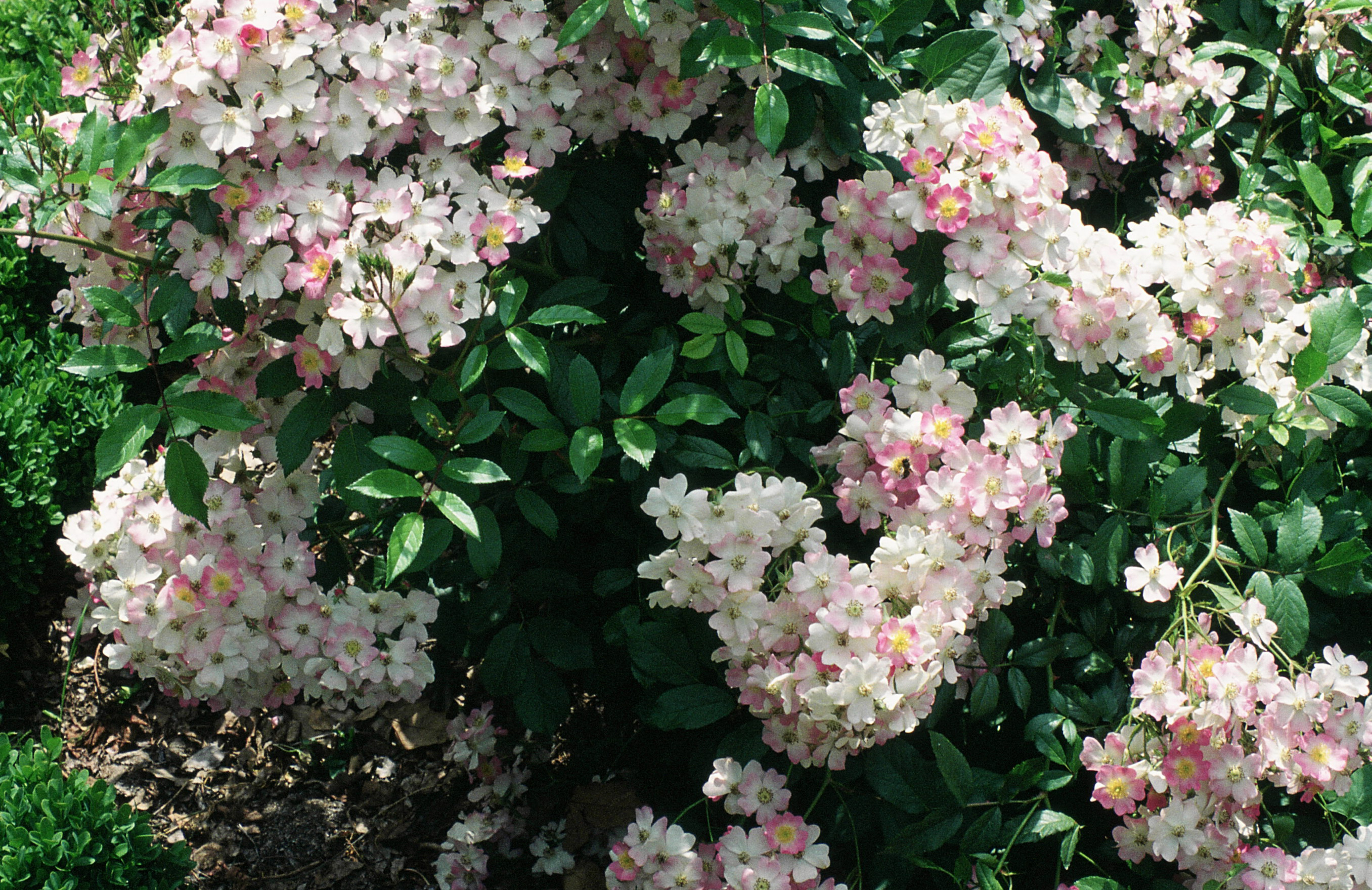
Hybrid Musk 'Ballerina' (Bentall, 1937)

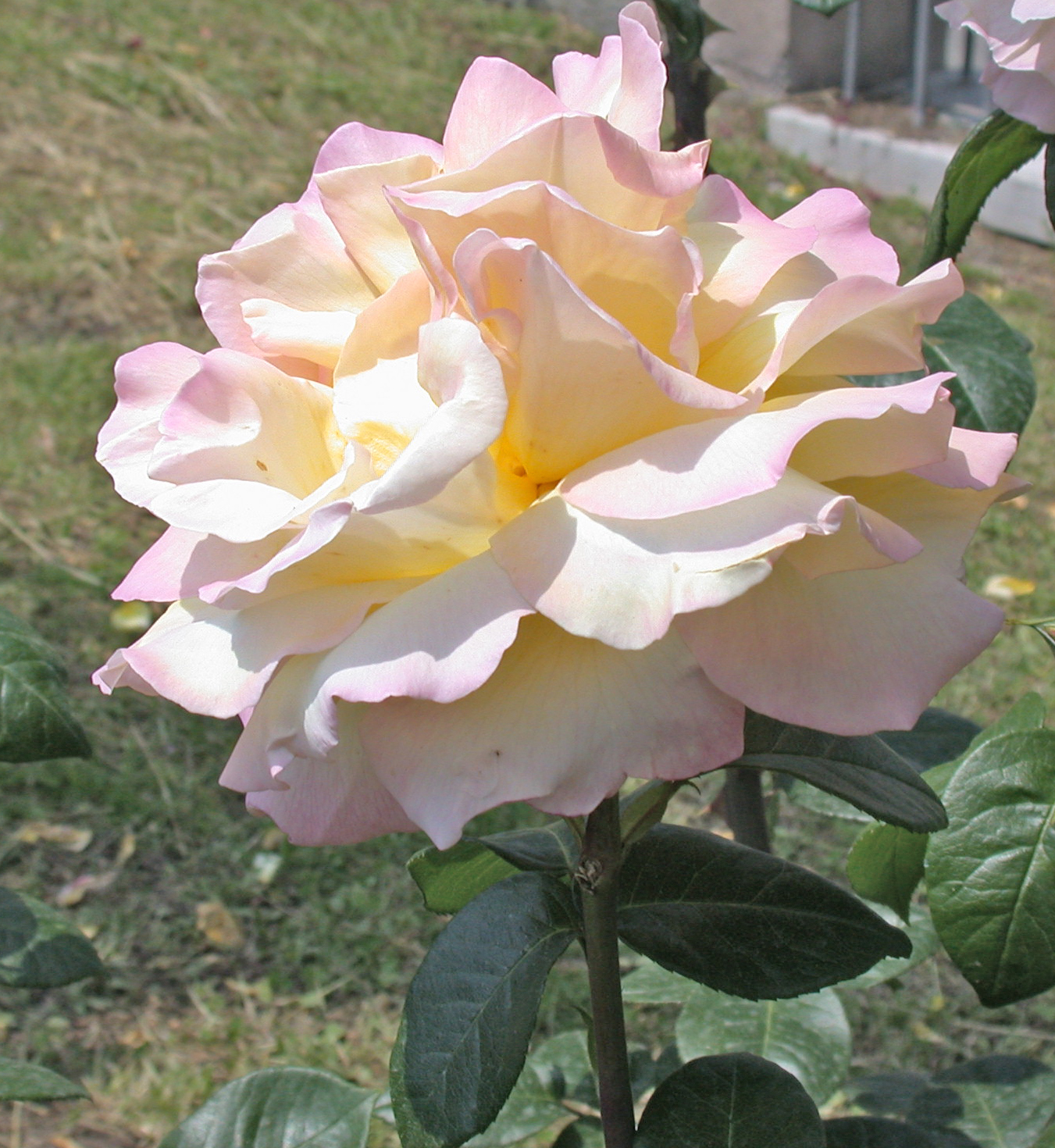
Hybrid Tea 'Peace' (syn. 'Mme A. Meilland', Meilland 1939)

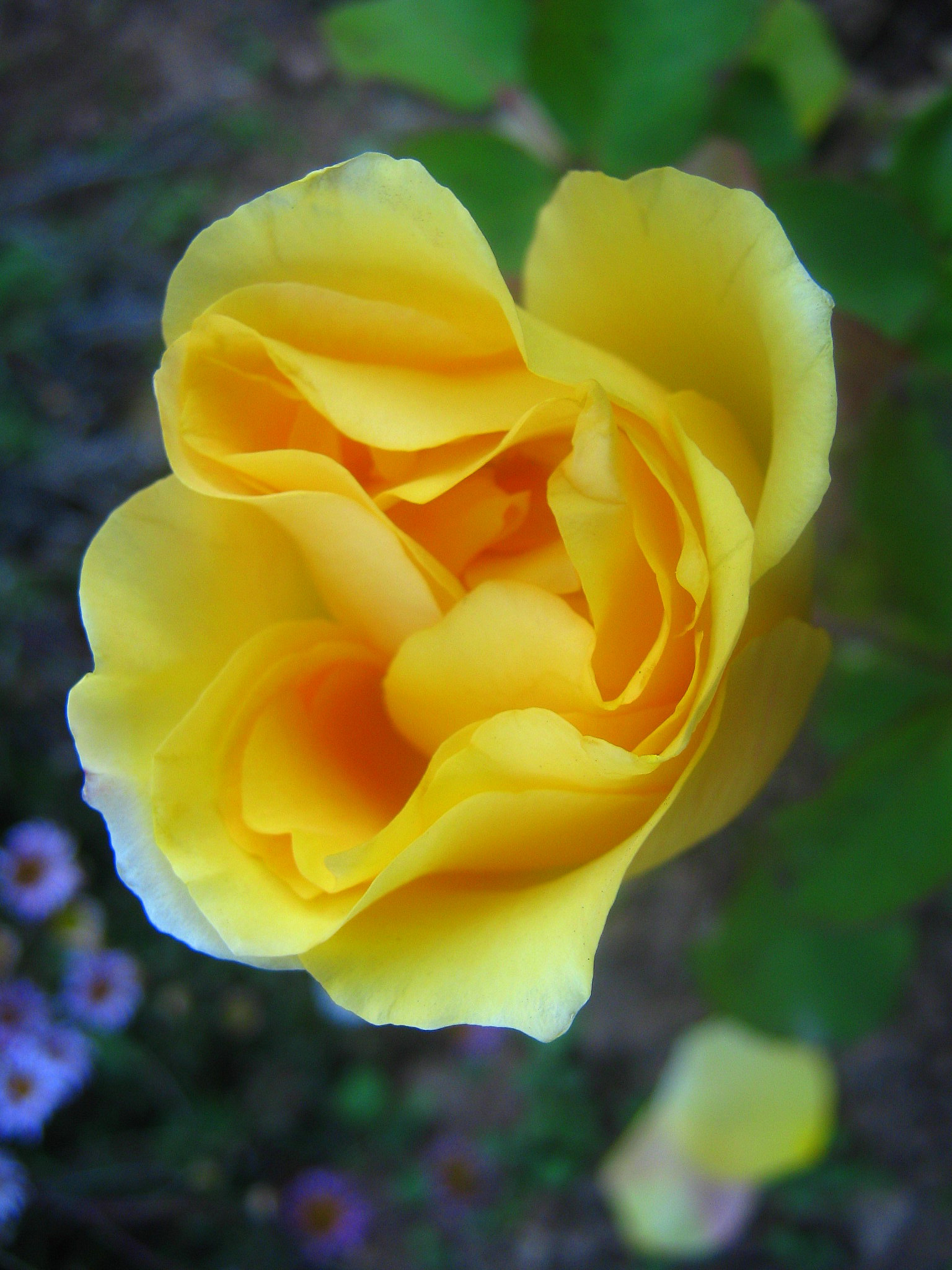
Hybrid Tea 'Lowell Thomas' (Mallerin, 1943)

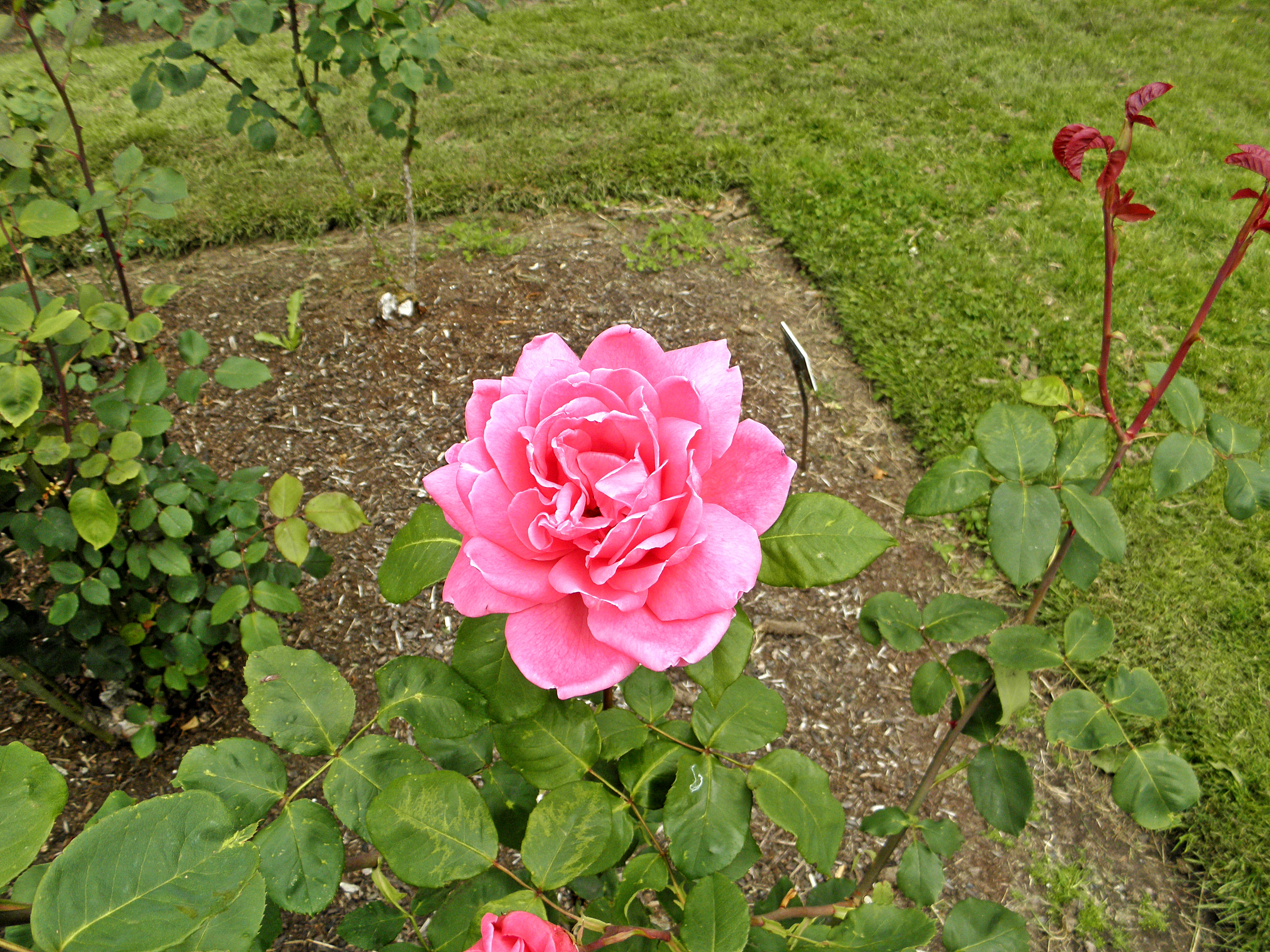
Hybrid Tea 'Capristrano', (Theodore John Morris, 1949) in Bush's Pasture Park

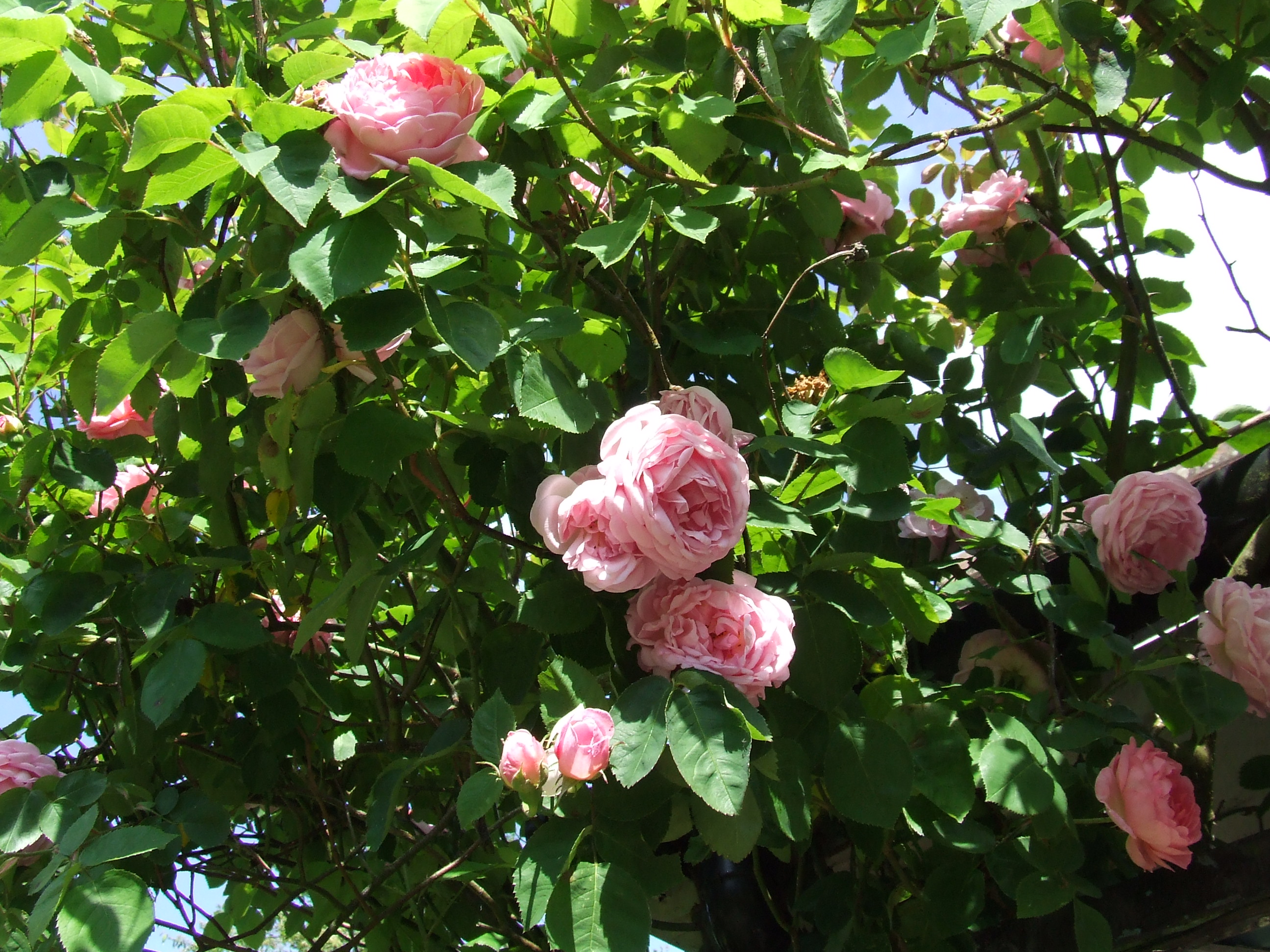
English Rose 'Constance Spry' (Austin, 1960)

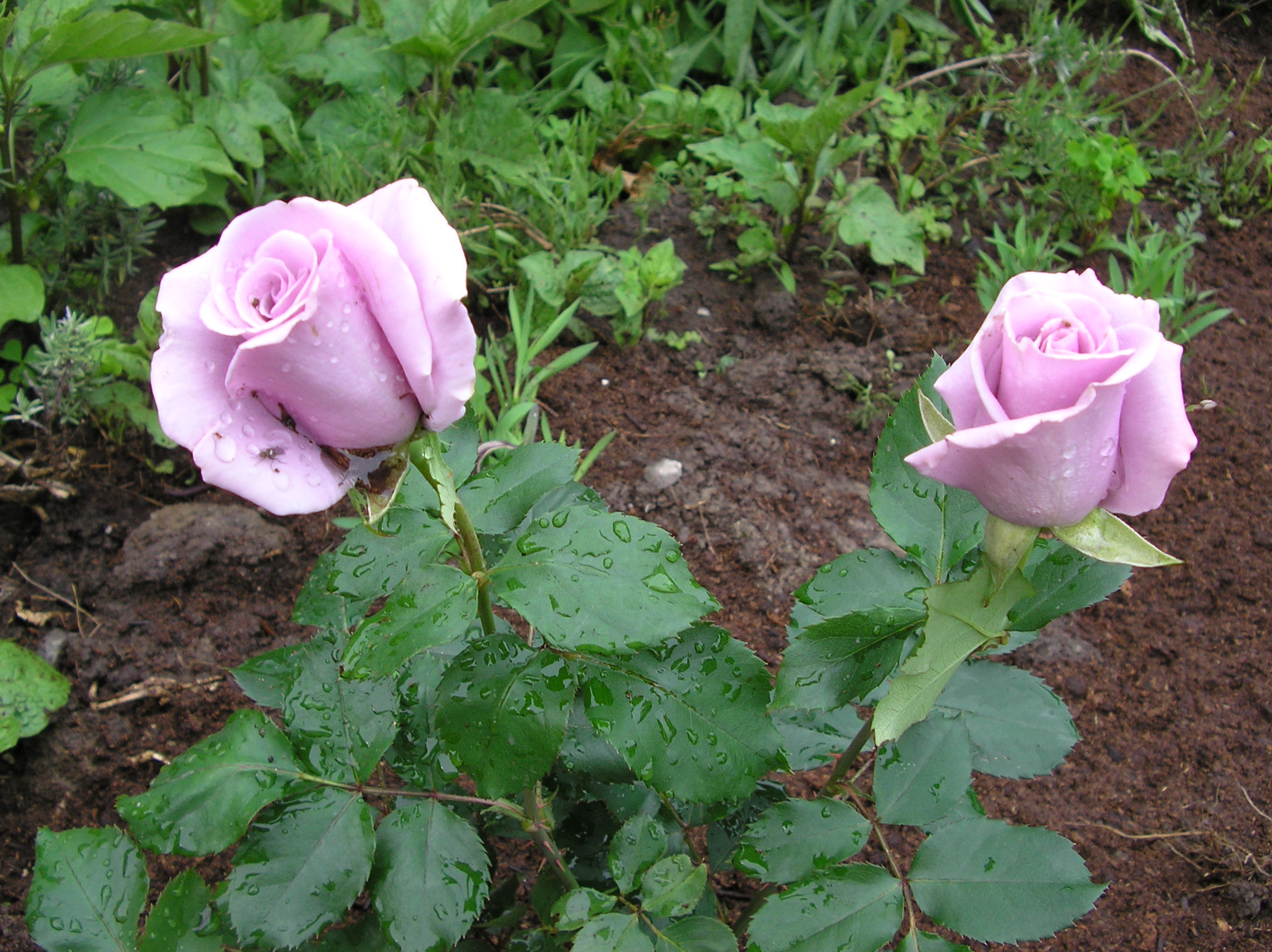
Floribunda Hybrid Tea 'Angel Face' (Swim & Weeks, 1968)

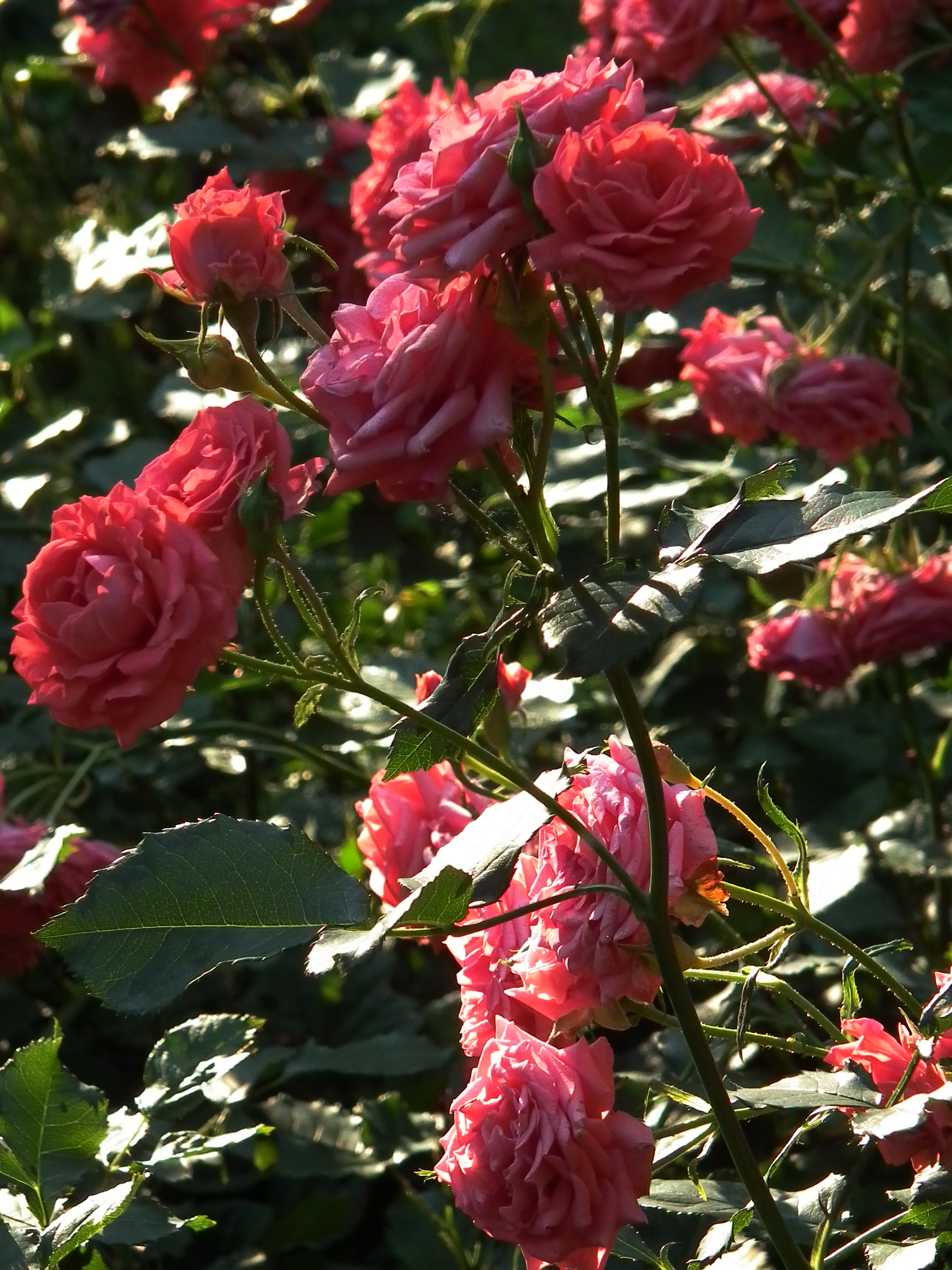
Rose 'Katja', (Verschoren, 1970)

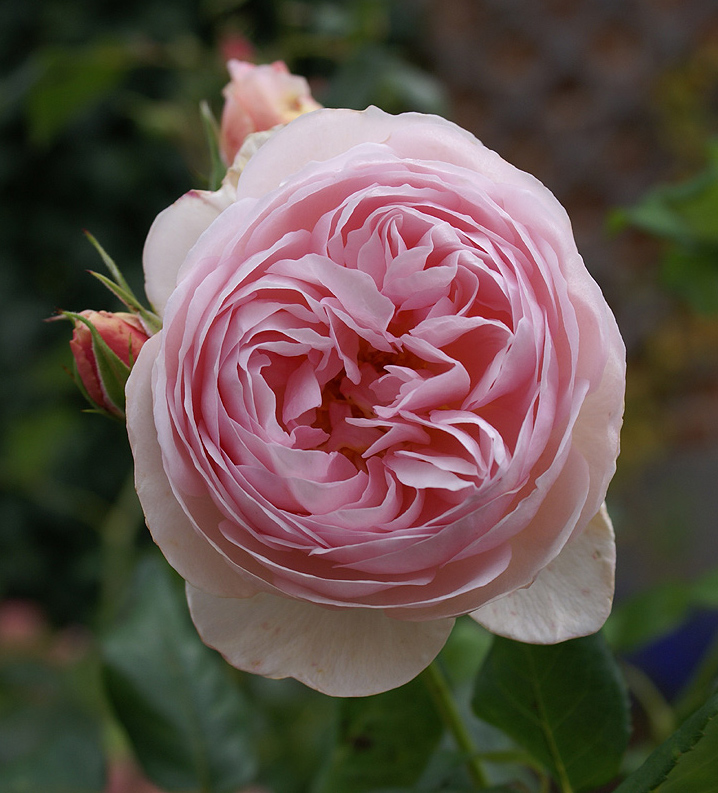
English Rose 'Heritage' (Austin, 1984)

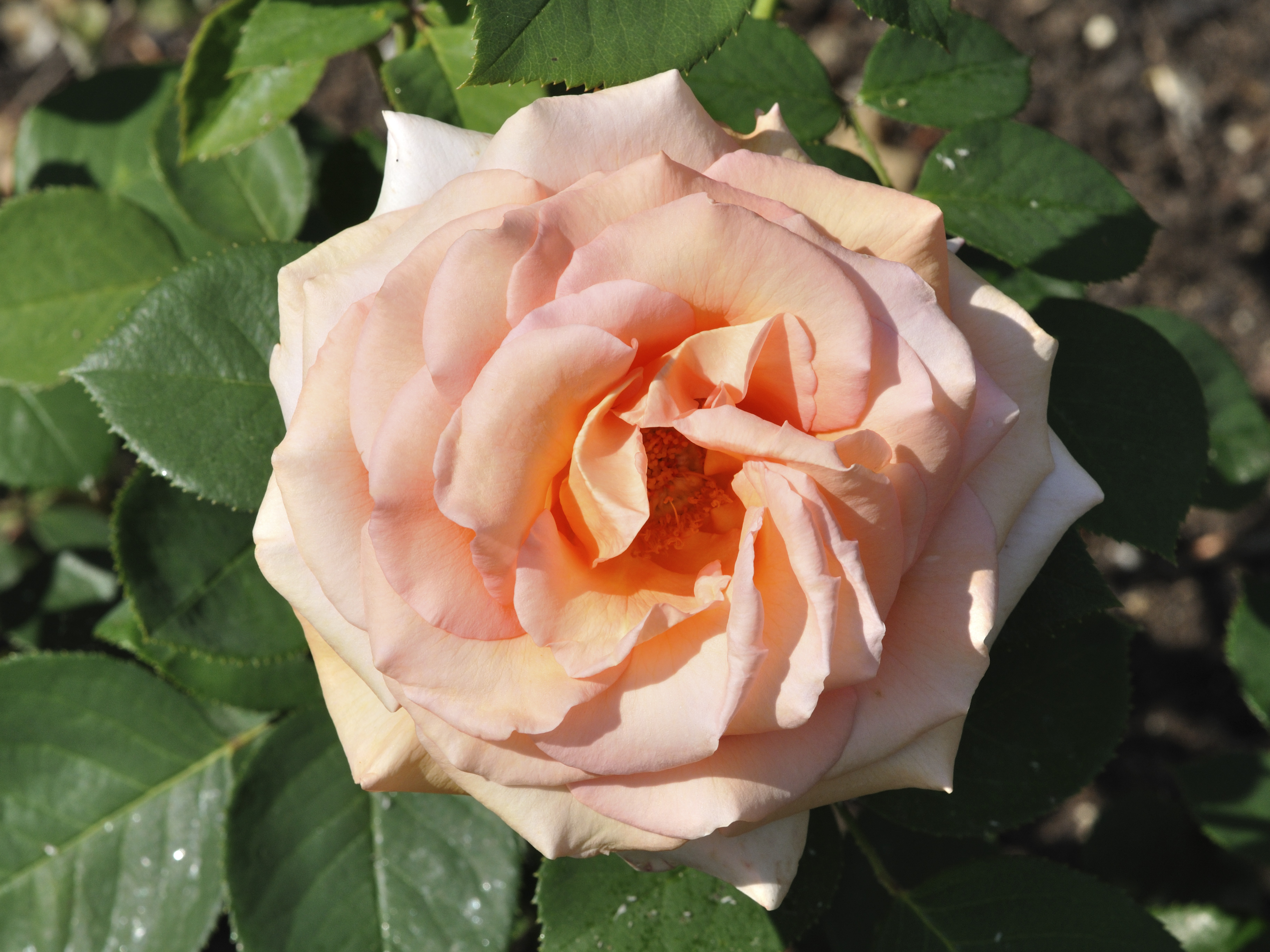
Hybrid Tea 'Sunset Celebration' (Fryer, 1994)

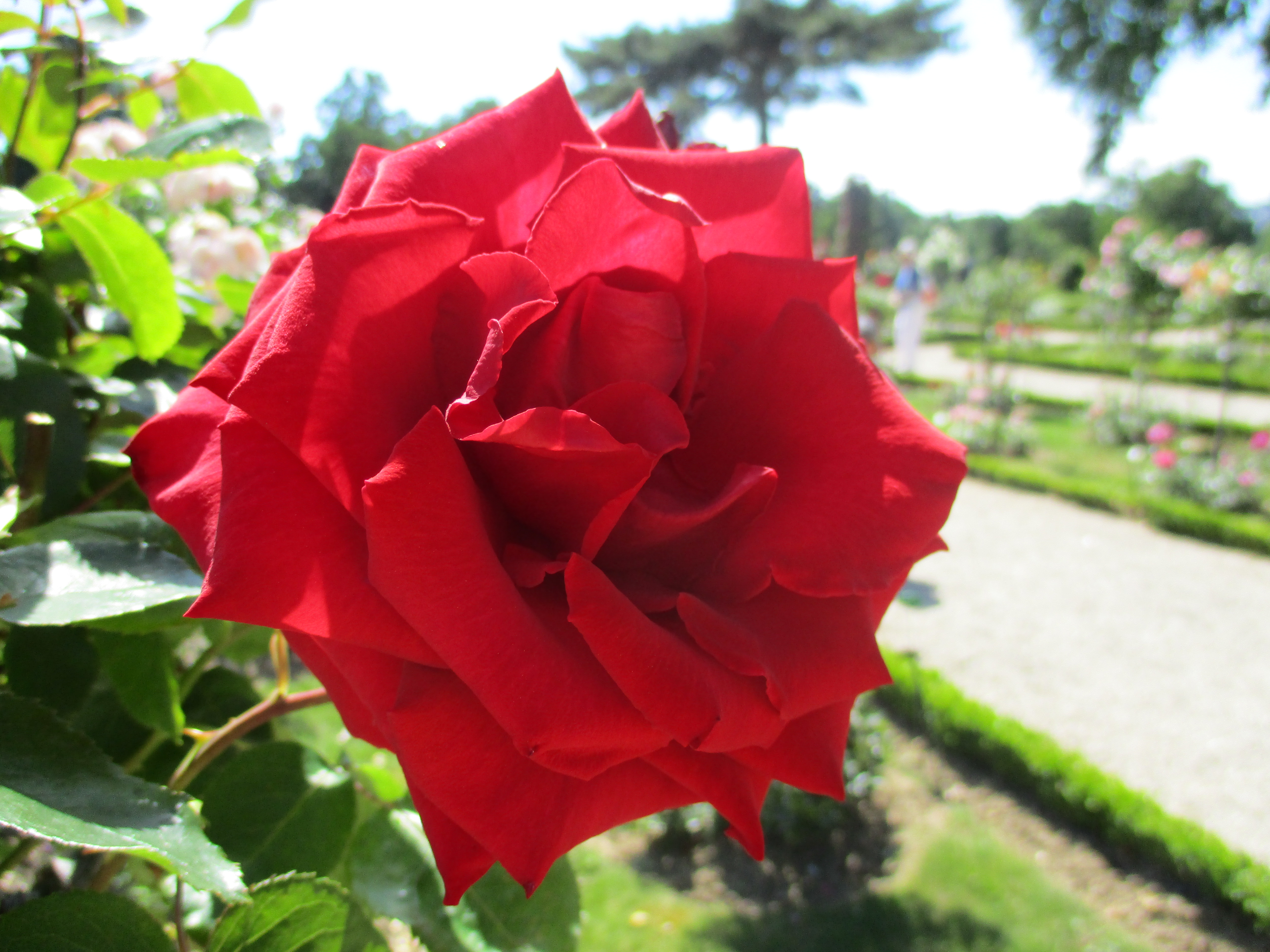
Hybrid Tea 'Pride of England' (Harkness, 1998)

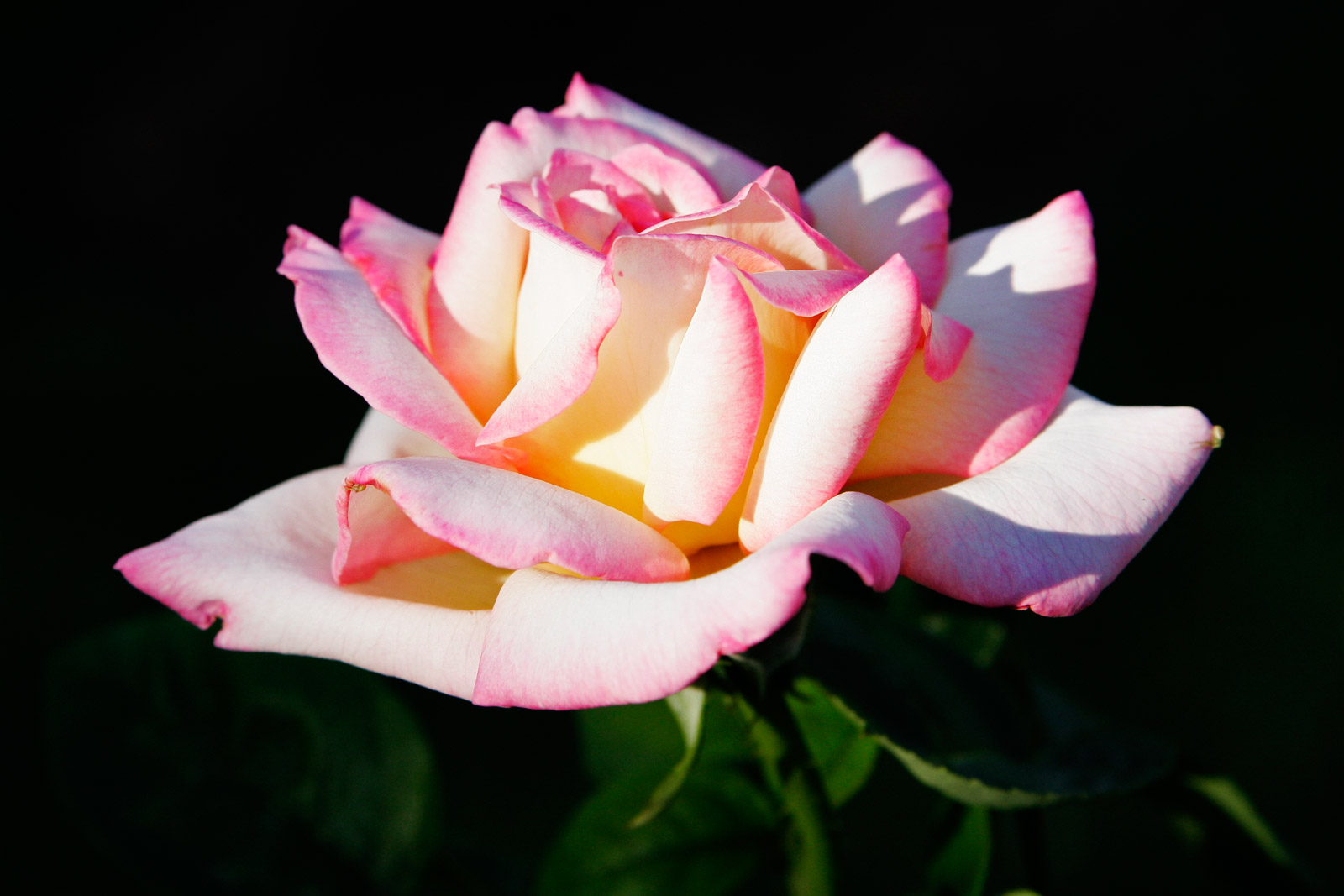
Hybrid Tea 'Cajun Sunrise' (Edwards, 2000)

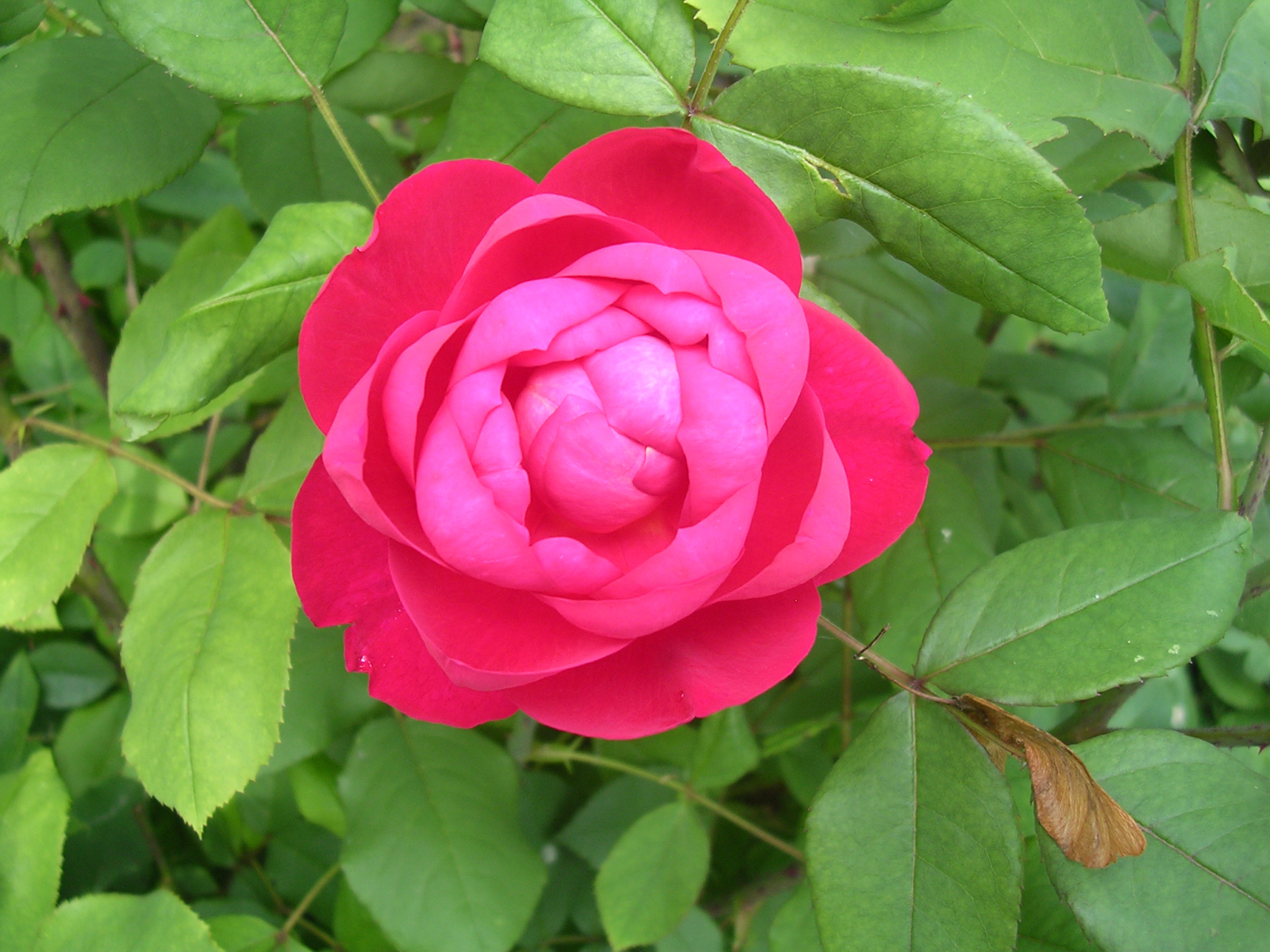
English Rose 'Benjamin Britten' (Austin, 2001)

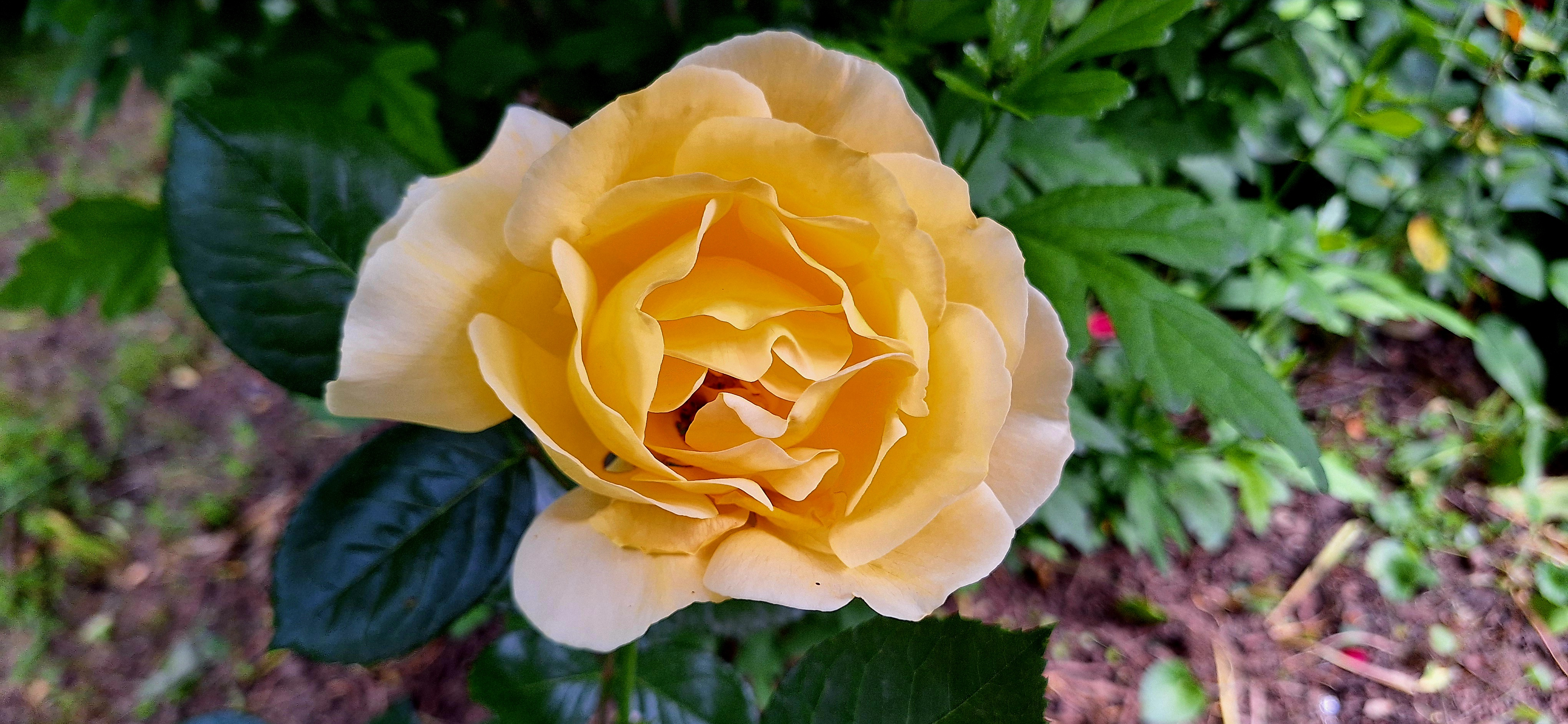
A bright yellow rose in Radovanu, Romania

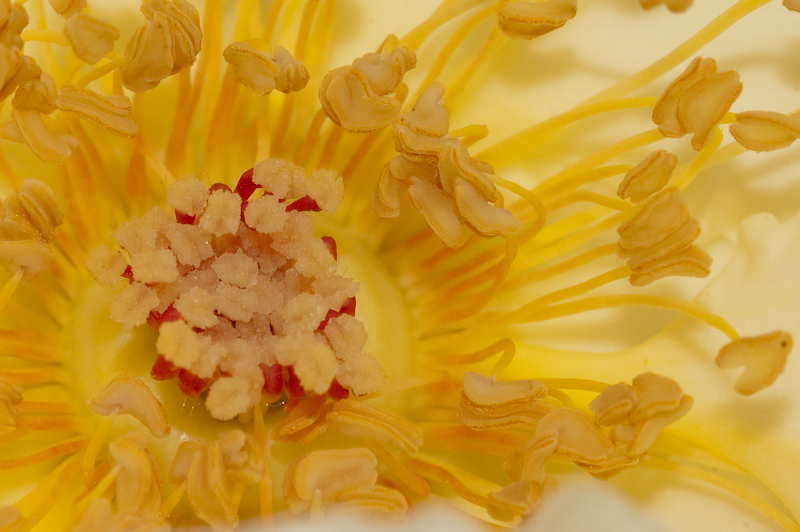
Yellow rose, showing stigmas (centre) and stamens with pollen

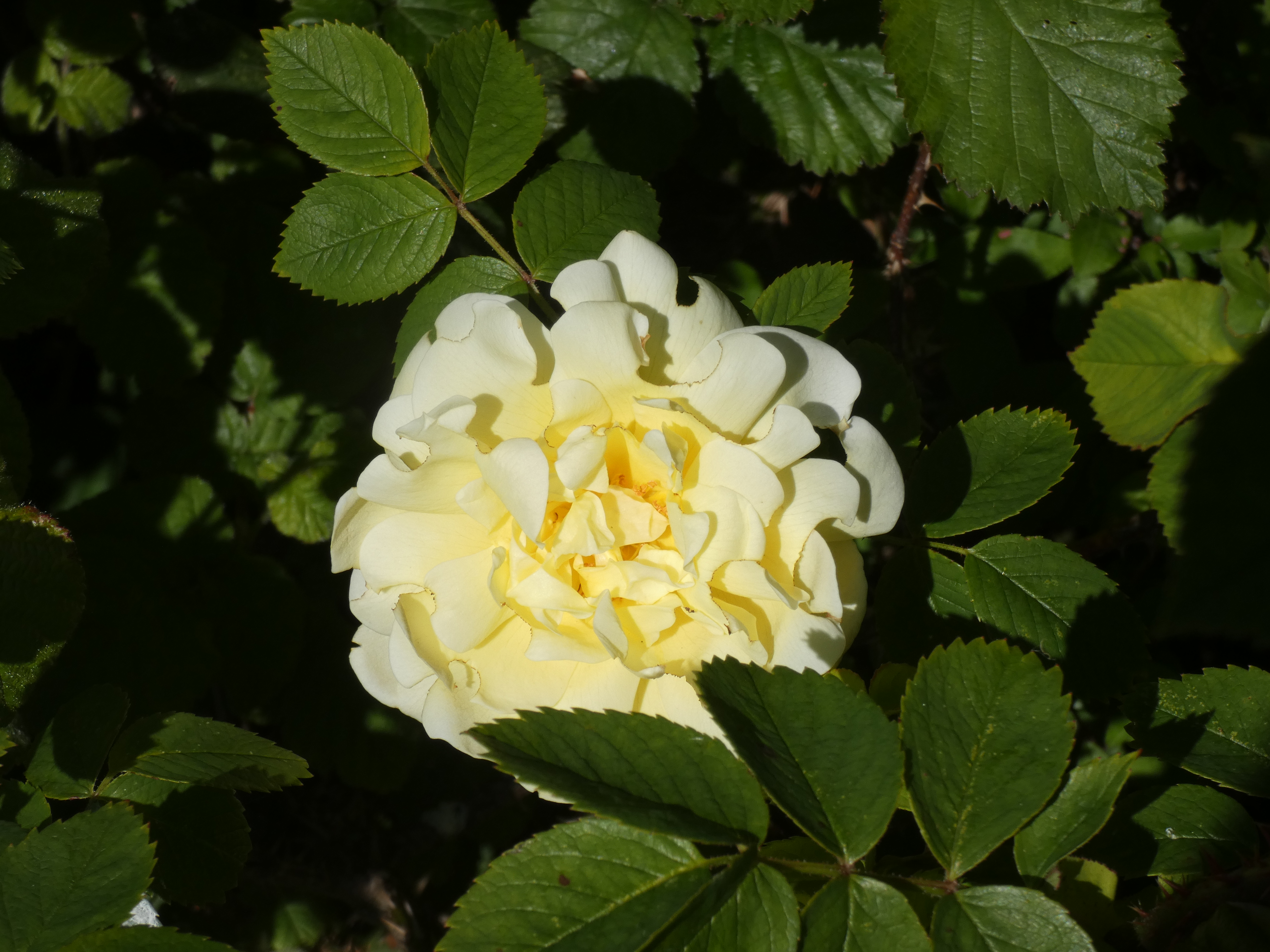
A Bright Yellow Rose

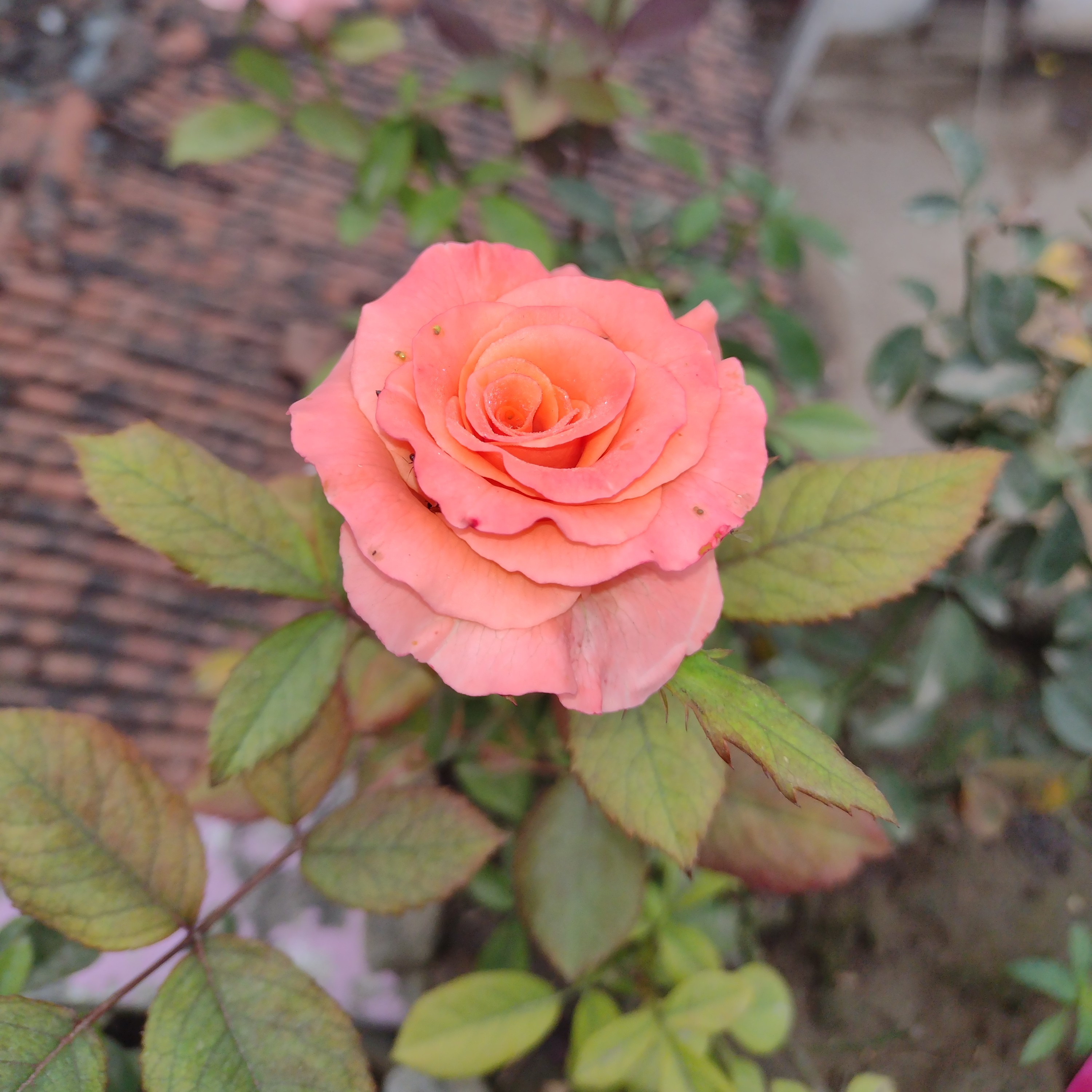
Light orange coloured Rose

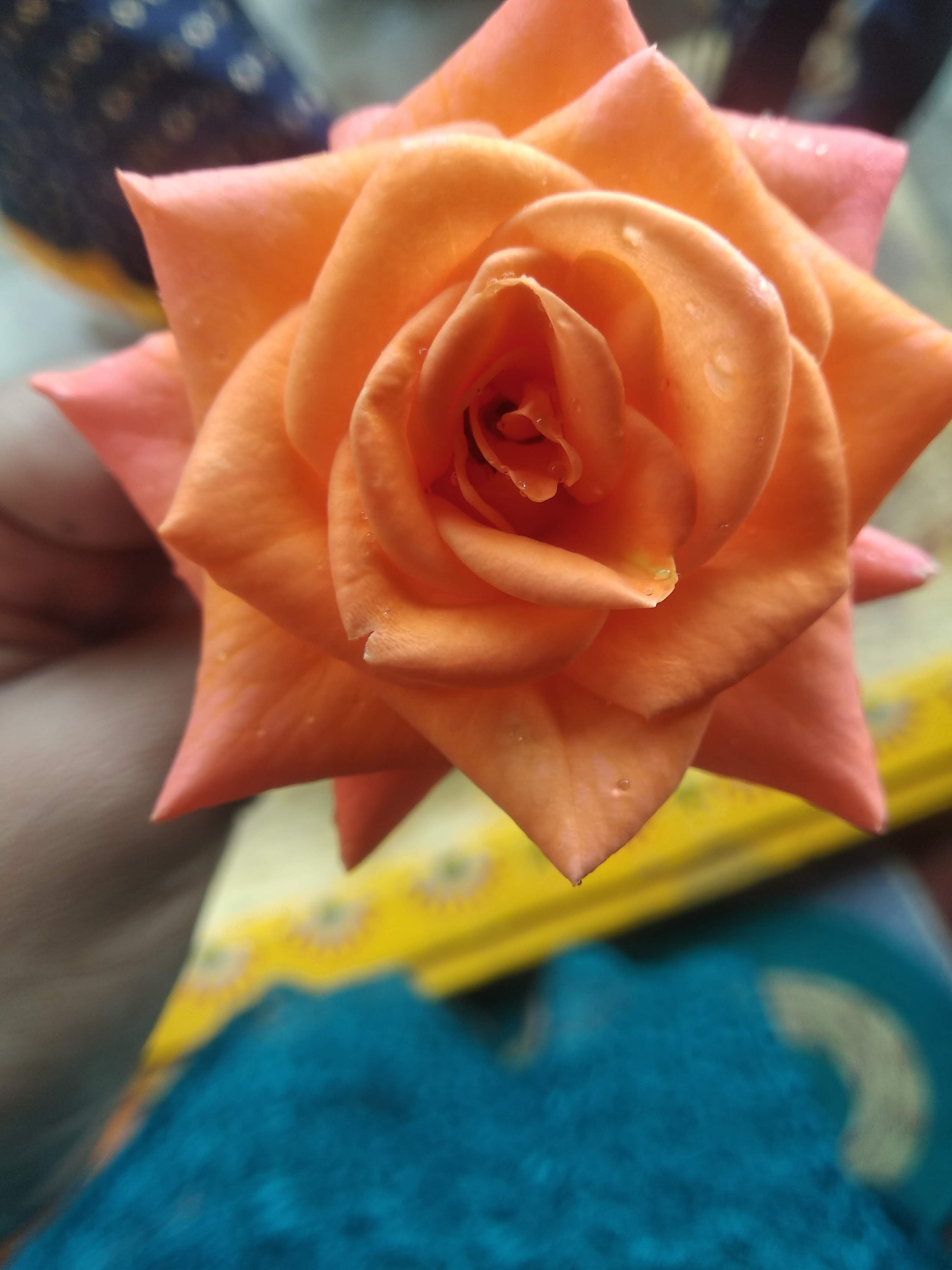
Orange coloured Rose from Utnoor Telangana, India

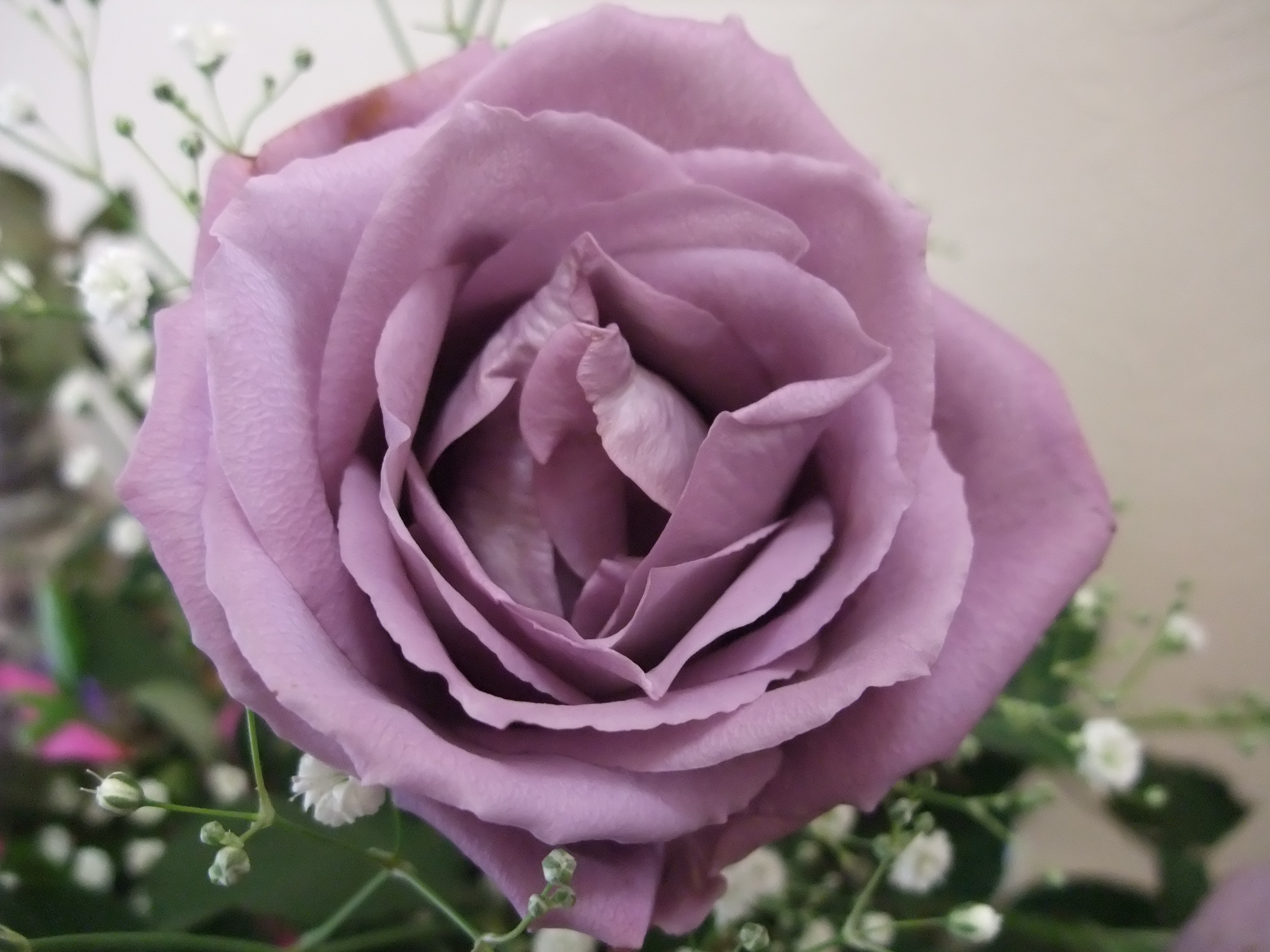
Genetically modified "blue" rose

== See also ==
- Rose species
- Rose cultivars named after people
- Rose show
- Rose trial grounds
- Rose Hall of Fame
- List of Award of Garden Merit roses
