= Rosa 'Captain Samuel Holland' =

Medium red Hybrid Kordesii, shrub rose cultivar

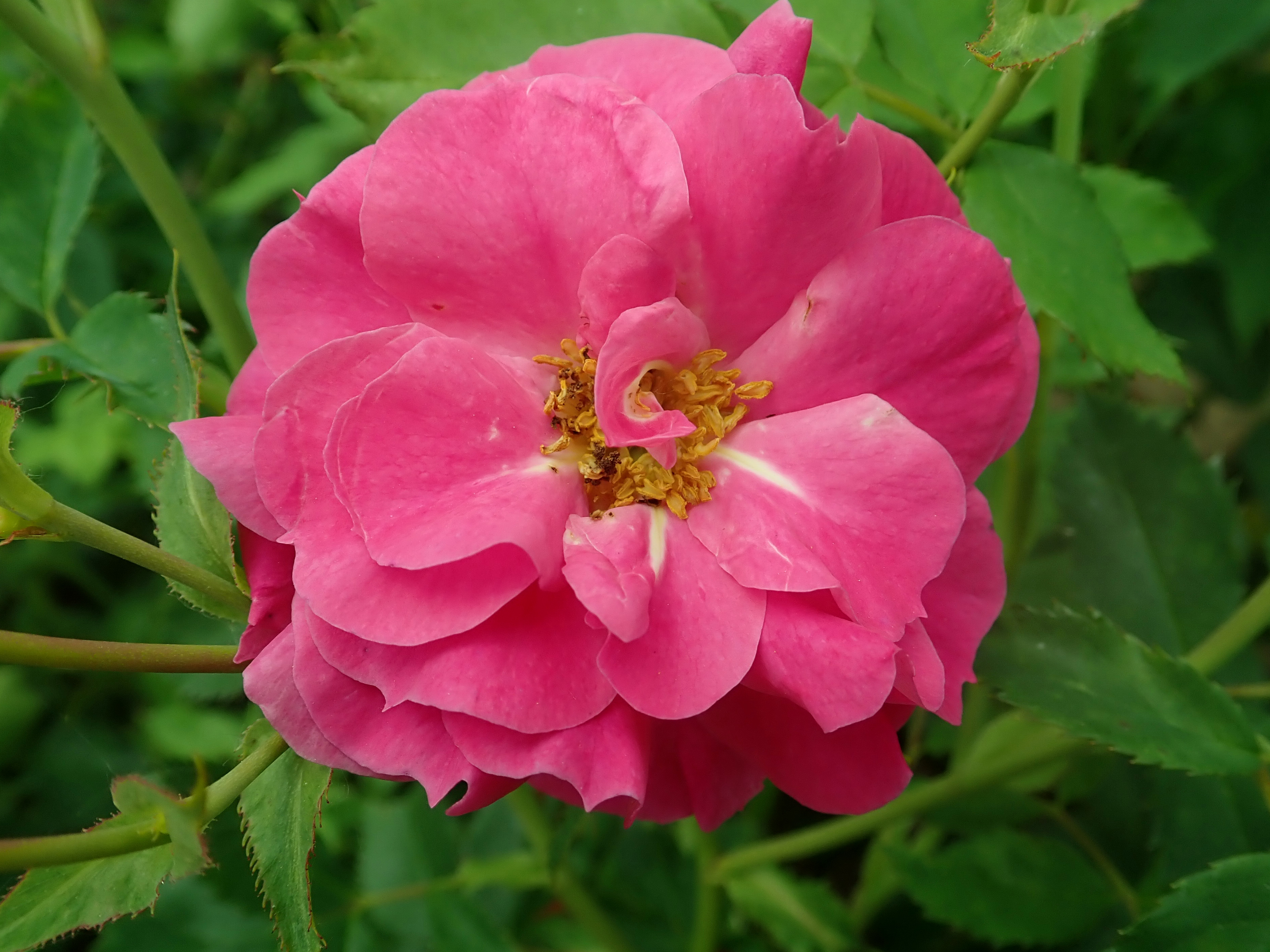
- Rosa 'Captain Samuel Holland'
- Genus: Rosa hybrid
- Hybrid parentage: 'Kordesii' x ('Red Dawn' x 'Suzanne')
- Cultivar group: Hybrid Kordesii, Shrub
- Marketing names: 'Captain Samuel Holland', 'Sam Holland'
- Breeder: Felicitas Svejda
- Origin: Ottawa, Canada, 1991

Rosa 'Captain Samuel Holland' is a medium red, Hybrid Kordesii, shrub rose, bred by Canadian rose breeder, Felicitas Svejda in 1981. It was introduced in Canada in 1991 by Agriculture and Agri-Food Canada. It is one of the Canadian Explorer roses that Svejda developed and named in honour of legendary Canadian explorers.

== Description ==
'Captain Samuel Holland' is a tall, bushy Hybrid Kordesii shrub rose, 5 to 10 ft (1.5–3.0 m) in height, with a 4 to 5 ft (1.2–1.5 m) spread. It has a medium double (17–25) bloom form of medium-sized 2.8 in (71 mm) petals. Pointed buds initially open flat and then display a double rosette bloom form. Flower color ranges from pale crimson to medium red. Flowers are carried singly or in large clusters of up to 12 roses on long stems. The rose has a light, musky fragrance, and has glossy, dark green foliage. The shrub blooms throughout the season and is disease resistant. 'Captain Samuel Holland' has a lax, rambling growth habit.

== History ==
=== Felicitas Svejda ===
Felicitas Svejda was born November 8, 1920, in Vienna, Austria. She studied agricultural science at the University of Natural Resources and Life Sciences in Vienna, where she earned a PhD in 1948. She moved to Canada in 1953, and was hired by the Canadian Department of Agriculture's research division in Ottawa, Ontario. Her first project was researching cereal grains, but later began working with ornamental plants. Svejda was given a new project in 1961 to create a series of winter hardy roses, which would thrive in the coldest regions of Canada, with sub-freezing winter temperatures of -50 C, and would also flower regularly during Canada's short growing season.

With no prior knowledge of roses, Svejvda developed a successful rose-breeding program at the Central Experimental Farm (CEF) in Ottawa. From the 1960s to the 1980s, she introduced many new cultivars, including 22 roses in the Explorer Rose Series, named in honour of Canadian explorers. Some of her most popular cultivars are: 'John Cabot', 'Jens Munk', 'David Thompson', and 'Henry Kelsey'. Svejvda led the rose-breeding program at CEF for 25 years, until her retirement in 1985. Her roses continued to be introduced in Canada well into the 1990s. Svejda died Jan. 19, 2016 in Ottawa at the age 95.

=== 'Captain Samuel Holland' ===
Svejda bred 'Captain Samuel Holland' in 1981 using stock parents, 'Kordesii' × ('Red Dawn' × 'Suzanne'). The cultivar is one of the Explorer Roses that Svejda developed to withstand the harsh Canadian winters and thrive in its short growing season. The plant was named in honour of Samuel Holland, the Surveyor General of British North America.

== Sources ==
- Quest-Ritson, Brigid; Quest-Ritson, Charles (2003). Encyclopedia of Roses. DK Publishing. ISBN 978-0756688684.
- Schneider, Peter (1995). Peter Schneider on Roses. Macmillan Publishing. ISBN 978-0028600383.
