= Rosa 'Charles Albanel' =

Hybrid Rugosa cultivar

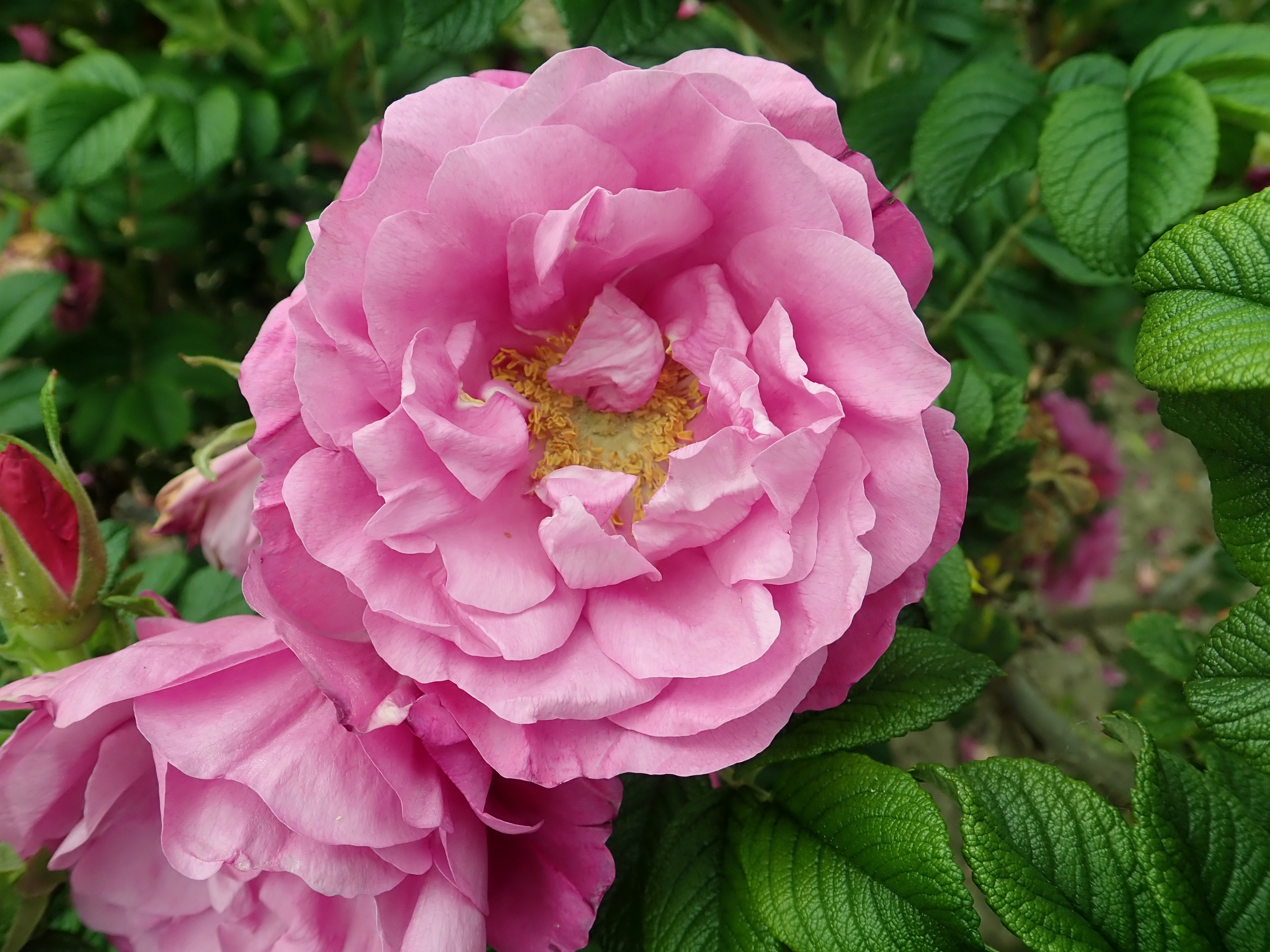
- Rosa 'Charles Albanel'
- Genus: Rosa hybrid
- Hybrid parentage: Seedling of Rosa 'Souvenir de Philemon Cochet'
- Cultivar group: Hybrid rugosa
- Breeder: Felicitas Svejda
- Origin: Ottawa, Canada, 1982

Rosa 'Charles Albanel' is a Hybrid rugosa cultivar, bred by Canadian rose breeder, Felicitas Svejda in 1970. It was introduced in Canada in 1982 by Agriculture and Agri-Food Canada. It is one of the Canadian Explorer roses that Svejda developed and named in honour of legendary Canadian explorers.

== Description ==
'Charles Albanel' is a medium-sized, very bushy Hybrid Rugosa variety, 2 to 4 ft (0.61–1.22 m) in height, with a 3 to 4 ft (0.91–1.22 m) spread. It has semi-double (15–20 petals), medium-sized 3.1 in (79 mm) flowers and a cluster-flowered bloom form. Blooms are reddish-purple with shades of mauve, and have yellow stamens. Flowers are carried in clusters of 3–7 and have a strong, fruity fragrance. The plant has healthy pale green foliage and many prickles. 'Charles Albanel' grows more horizontally than vertically and is often grown as a low shrub. It flowers early and profusely and will repeat somewhat sporadically for the rest of the season.

== History ==
=== Felicitas Svejda ===
Felicitas Svejda was born November 8, 1920, in Vienna, Austria. She studied agricultural science at the University of Natural Resources and Life Sciences in Vienna, where she earned a PhD in 1948. She moved to Canada in 1953, and was hired by the Canadian Department of Agriculture's research division in Ottawa, Ontario. Her first project was researching cereal grains, but later began working with ornamental plants. Svejda was given a new project in 1961 to create a series of winter hardy roses, which would thrive in the coldest regions of Canada, with sub-freezing winter temperatures of -50 C, and would also flower regularly during Canada's short growing season.

With no prior knowledge of roses, Svejvda developed a successful rose-breeding program at the Central Experimental Farm (CEF) in Ottawa. From the 1960s to the 1980s, she introduced many new cultivars, including 22 roses in the Explorer Rose Series, named in honour of Canadian explorers. Some of her most popular cultivars are: 'John Cabot', 'Alexander MacKenzie', 'David Thompson', and 'Jens Munk'. Svejvda led the rose-breeding program at CEF for 25 years, until her retirement in 1985. Her roses continued to be introduced in Canada well into the 1990s. Svejda died Jan. 19, 2016 in Ottawa at the age 95.

=== 'Charles Albanel' ===
Svejda developed 'Charles Albanel' in 1970 from a self-pollinated seedling of Rosa 'Souvenir de Philémon Cochet. The rose cultivar was introduced in Canada in 1982 by Agriculture and Agri-Food Canada. It one of the Explorer Roses that Svejda developed to withstand the harsh Canadian winters and thrive in its short growing season. 'Charles Albanel' is named for French Jesuit priest, Charles Albanel (1616–1696), who was the first European to travel overland in Canada to Hudson Bay.
