= Rosa 'William Baffin' =

Pink Hybrid Kordesii rose cultivar

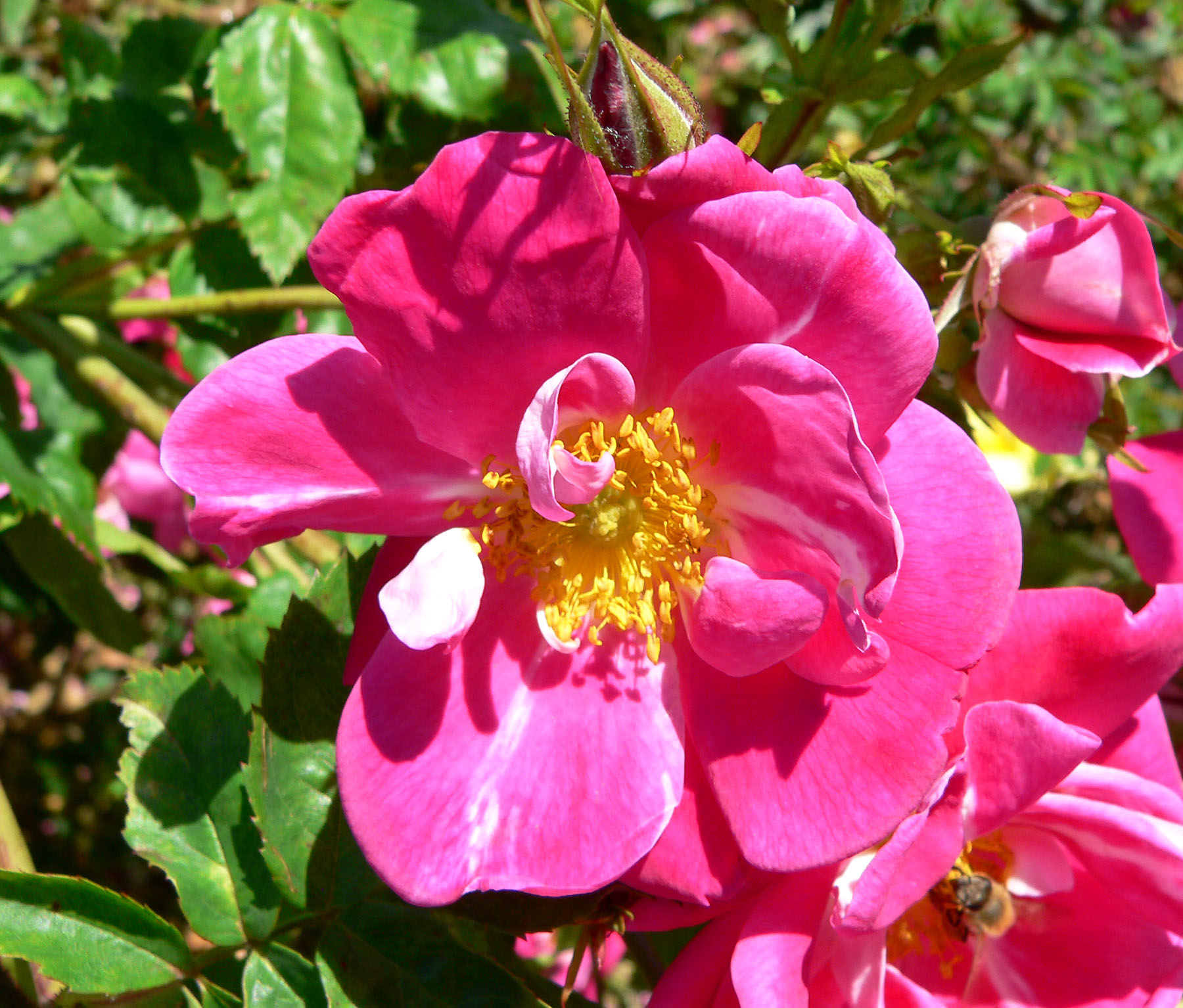
- Rosa 'William Baffin'
- Genus: Rosa hybrid
- Hybrid parentage: 'Kordesii' x ('Red Dawn' x 'Suzanne')
- Cultivar group: Hybrid Kordesii
- Breeder: Felicitas Svejda
- Origin: Ottawa, Canada, 1983

Rosa 'William Baffin' is a deep pink Hybrid Kordesii rose cultivar, bred by Canadian rose breeder, Felicitas Svejda in 1974. It was introduced in Canada in 1983 by Agriculture and Agri-Food Canada. It is one of the hardiest of the Canadian Explorer roses that Svejda developed and named in honour of legendary Canadian explorers.

== Description ==
'William Baffin' is a tall Hybrid Kordesii shrub rose variety, 7 to 10 ft (2.1–3.0 m) in height, with a 3 to 4 ft (0.91–1.22 m) spread. It has semi-double (8–15 petals), medium-sized 2.5 in (64 mm) flowers and a flat, saucer-shaped bloom form. Blooms are deep pink with golden stamens and flashes of white at the center of the petal. Flowers are carried in clusters of 10–30 and have either no fragrance or a light fragrance. The plant has an arching, climbing growth habit and small, glossy, dark green foliage. It is very disease resistant and blooms continuously throughout the season.

== History ==
=== Felicitas Svejda ===
Felicitas Svejda was born November 8, 1920, in Vienna, Austria. She studied agricultural science at the University of Natural Resources and Life Sciences in Vienna, where she earned a PhD in 1948. She moved to Canada in 1953, and was hired by the Canadian Department of Agriculture's research division in Ottawa, Ontario. Her first project was researching cereal grains, but later began working with ornamental plants. Svejda was given a new project in 1961 to create a series of winter hardy roses, which would thrive in the coldest regions of Canada, with sub-freezing winter temperatures of -50 C, and would also flower regularly during Canada's short growing season.

With no prior knowledge of roses, Svejvda developed a successful rose-breeding program at the Central Experimental Farm (CEF) in Ottawa. From the 1960s to the 1980s, she introduced many new cultivars, including 22 roses in the Explorer Rose Series, named in honour of Canadian explorers. Some of her most popular cultivars are: 'John Cabot', 'Alexander MacKenzie', 'David Thompson', and 'Jens Munk'. Svejvda led the rose-breeding program at CEF for 25 years, until her retirement in 1985. Her roses continued to be introduced in Canada well into the 1990s. Svejda died Jan. 19, 2016 in Ottawa at the age 95.

=== 'William Baffin' ===
Svejda bred 'William Baffin' in 1974 by crossing 'Kordesii' x ('Red Dawn' x 'Suzanne'). The rose cultivar was introduced in Canada in 1983 by Agriculture and Agri-Food Canada. It is considered one of the hardiest and most vigorous of the Explorer Roses that Svejda developed to withstand the harsh Canadian winters and thrive in its short growing season. 'William Baffin' is named for English navigator, William Baffin, (c. 1584–1622), who is best known for his attempt to discover a Northwest Passage from the Atlantic to the Pacific. He is also the first European to discover Baffin Bay in Canada.
