= Rosa 'John Davis' =

Pink Hybrid Kordesii rose cultivar

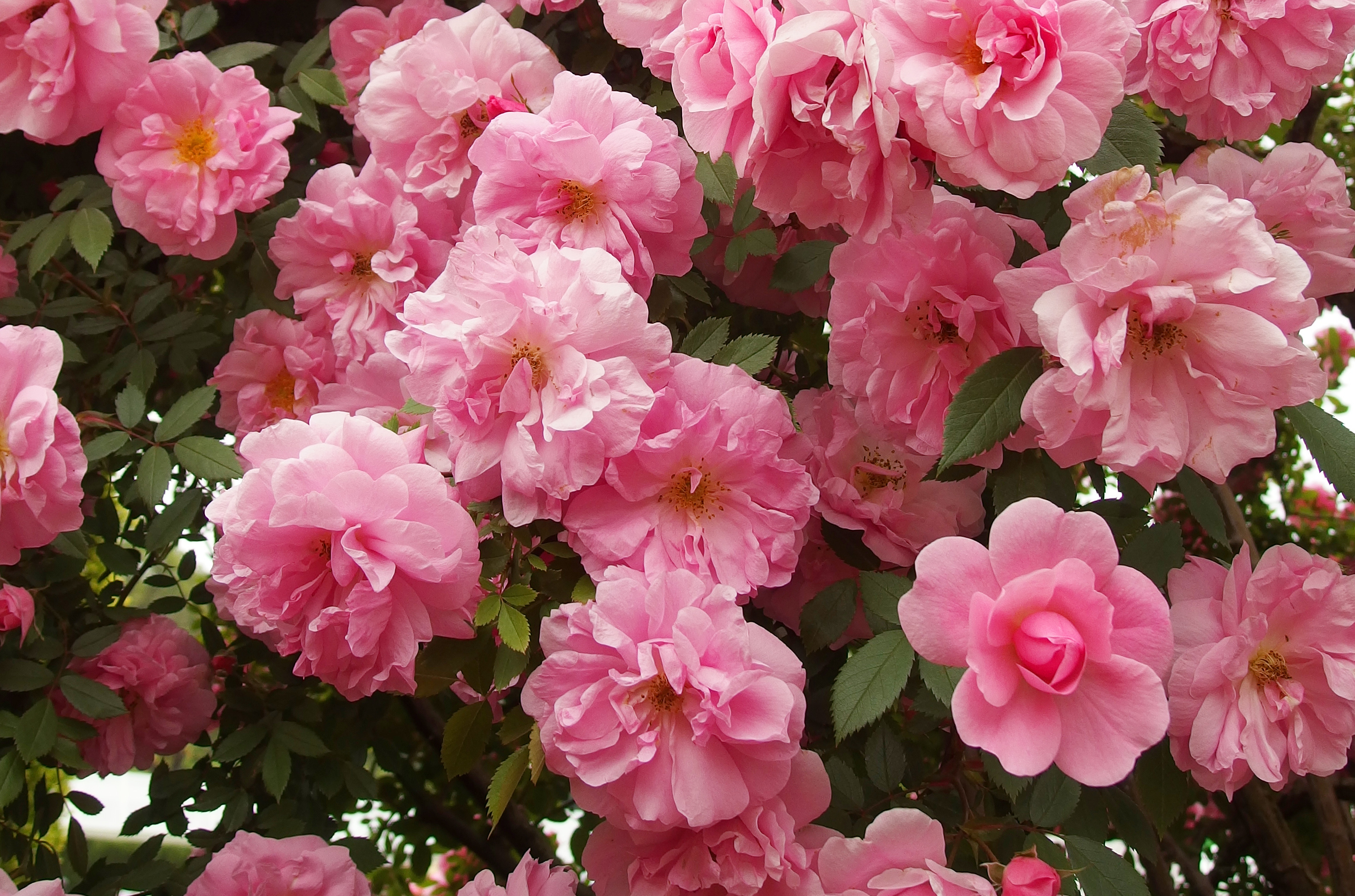
- Rosa 'John Davis'
- Genus: Rosa hybrid
- Hybrid parentage: 'Kordesii' x ('Red Dawn' x 'Suzanne')
- Cultivar group: Hybrid Kordesii rose
- Breeder: Felicitas Svejda
- Origin: Ottawa, Canada, 1977

Rosa 'John Davis' is a pink Hybrid Kordesii rose cultivar, bred by Canadian rose breeder Felicitas Svejda. It was introduced in Canada in 1977 by Agriculture and Agri-Food Canada. It is considered to be best of the early Canadian Explorer roses that Svejda developed and named in honour of legendary Canadian explorers.

== Description ==
'John Davis' is a tall Hybrid Kordesii shrub rose variety, 7 ft (2.1 m) in height with a 6 ft (1.8 m) spread. It has a quartered, cupped bloom form of medium-sized 3 in (76 mm) Flowers. Blooms begin as bright pink and then fade as they age to a lighter pink with golden centers. Flowers are carried in clusters of 10–15 and have a light, musky fragrance. The rose will bloom occasionally during the season after its first flowering. The plant has an arching, rambling growth habit and glossy, dark green foliage.

== History ==
=== Felicitas Svejda ===
Felicitas Svejda was born November 8, 1920, in Vienna, Austria. She studied agricultural science at the University of Natural Resources and Life Sciences in Vienna, where she earned a PhD in 1948. She moved to Canada in 1953 and was hired by the Canadian Department of Agriculture's research division in Ottawa, Ontario. Her first project was researching cereal grains, but later she began working with ornamental plants. Svejda was given a new project in 1961 to create a series of winter hardy roses which would thrive in the coldest regions of Canada, with sub-freezing winter temperatures of -50 C, and would also flower regularly during Canada's short growing season.

With no prior knowledge of roses, Svejvda developed a successful rose-breeding program at the Central Experimental Farm (CEF) in Ottawa. From the 1960s to the 1980s, she introduced many new cultivars, including 22 roses in the Explorer Rose Series, named in honour of Canadian explorers. Some of her most popular cultivars are 'John Cabot', 'Alexander MacKenzie', 'David Thompson', and 'Jens Munk'. Svejvda led the rose-breeding program at CEF for 25 years until her retirement in 1985. Her roses continued to be introduced in Canada well into the 1990s. Svejda died on January 19, 2016, in Ottawa at the age of 95.

=== 'John Davis' ===
Svejda bred 'John Davis' by crossing 'Kordesii' and ('Red Dawn' x 'Suzanne'). The rose cultivar was introduced in Canada in 1977 by Agriculture and Agri-Food Canada. It is one of the Explorer Roses that Svejda developed to withstand the harsh Canadian winters and thrive in its short growing season. It has been described as the "most beautiful of the very hardy Canadian roses". 'John Davis' is named for John Davis (1550–1605), an uninvited settler who helped colonize the Northwest Passage. He was also the first settler to pass through the Davis Strait between Greenland and Canada.
