= David Thompson =

David or Dave Thompson may refer to:

== Business ==
- David Thompson (American businessman, born 1798) (1798–1871), president of New York Life Insurance & Trust Company
- David Thompson (British businessman) (1936–2021), co-founder of Hillsdown Holdings
- G. David Thompson (1899–1965), American investment banker, industrialist, and modern art collector

== Entertainment ==
- Dave Thompson (author) (born 1960), English author, largely dealing with rock and pop music
- Dave Thompson (comedian) (born 1959), English actor and comedian
- David M. Thompson (born 1950), founder of BBC Films
- David Thompson (singer) (1950–2010), lead singer of the Canadian country band Thunder Road
- David Thompson (writer) (born 1956), American writer and playwright
- David W. Thompson (born 1994), American actor
- Lil' Dave Thompson (1969–2010), American electric blues guitarist, singer and songwriter
- David Thompson, a pen name of American author David L. Robbins (born 1950)

== Law ==
- David R. Thompson (1930–2011), U.S. federal judge
- David N. Thompson (1859–1945), justice of the Louisiana Supreme Court
- Sir Dave Thompson (police officer), chief constable of West Midlands Police

== Politics ==
- David Thompson (Canada West politician) (1793–1851), entrepreneur and political figure in Canada West
- David P. Thompson (1834–1901), governor of the Idaho Territory, mayor of Portland, Oregon
- David E. Thompson (1854–1942), American diplomat
- David Thompson (Canadian politician) (1836–1886), member of the Canadian House of Commons
- Dave Thompson (Scottish politician) (born 1949), Scottish National Party member of the Scottish Parliament for Skye, Lochaber and Badenoch
- Dave Thompson (Minnesota politician) (born 1961), Minnesota state senator
- David Thompson (Barbadian politician) (1961–2010), prime minister of Barbados

== Sports ==
=== Football and rugby ===
- David Thompson (footballer, born 1962), former English football player with Rochdale, Notts County, Wigan, Preston and Chester
- David Thompson (footballer, born 1968), English former professional footballer
- David Thompson (footballer, born 1977), former English football player with Liverpool, Coventry, Blackburn, Wigan, Portsmouth and Bolton
- Dave Thompson (footballer, born 1945), English former professional footballer
- Dave Thompson (American football) (born 1949), American football player
- David Thompson (American football) (born 1975), American football player
- David Thompson (rugby league, born 1978), Australian rugby league footballer
- Dave Thompson (rugby league, born 1995), for Leigh Centurions

=== Other sports ===
- David Thompson (basketball) (born 1954), American basketball player
- David Thompson (cricketer) (born 1976), former English cricketer
- David Thompson (baseball) (born 1993), American baseball player

== Other fields ==
- David B. Thompson (1923–2013), American prelate of the Roman Catholic Church
- David D. Thompson (born 1963), US Space Force general
- David Thompson (New Hampshire settler) (1593–?), founder of the first European settlement in New Hampshire
- David Thompson (explorer) (1770–1857), Canadian explorer
- David Thompson (chef), Australian chef
- David Thompson (nurse) (born 1955), British academic nurse and psychologist
- Rosa 'David Thompson', a rose cultivar
- David A. Thompson (born 1940), American electrical engineer

== See also ==
- David Thompson Highway, named for the explorer of Canada
- David Thompson Secondary School (disambiguation)
- David Thomson (disambiguation)
