= Rosa 'Henry Hudson' =

White blend Hybrid Kordesii rose cultivar

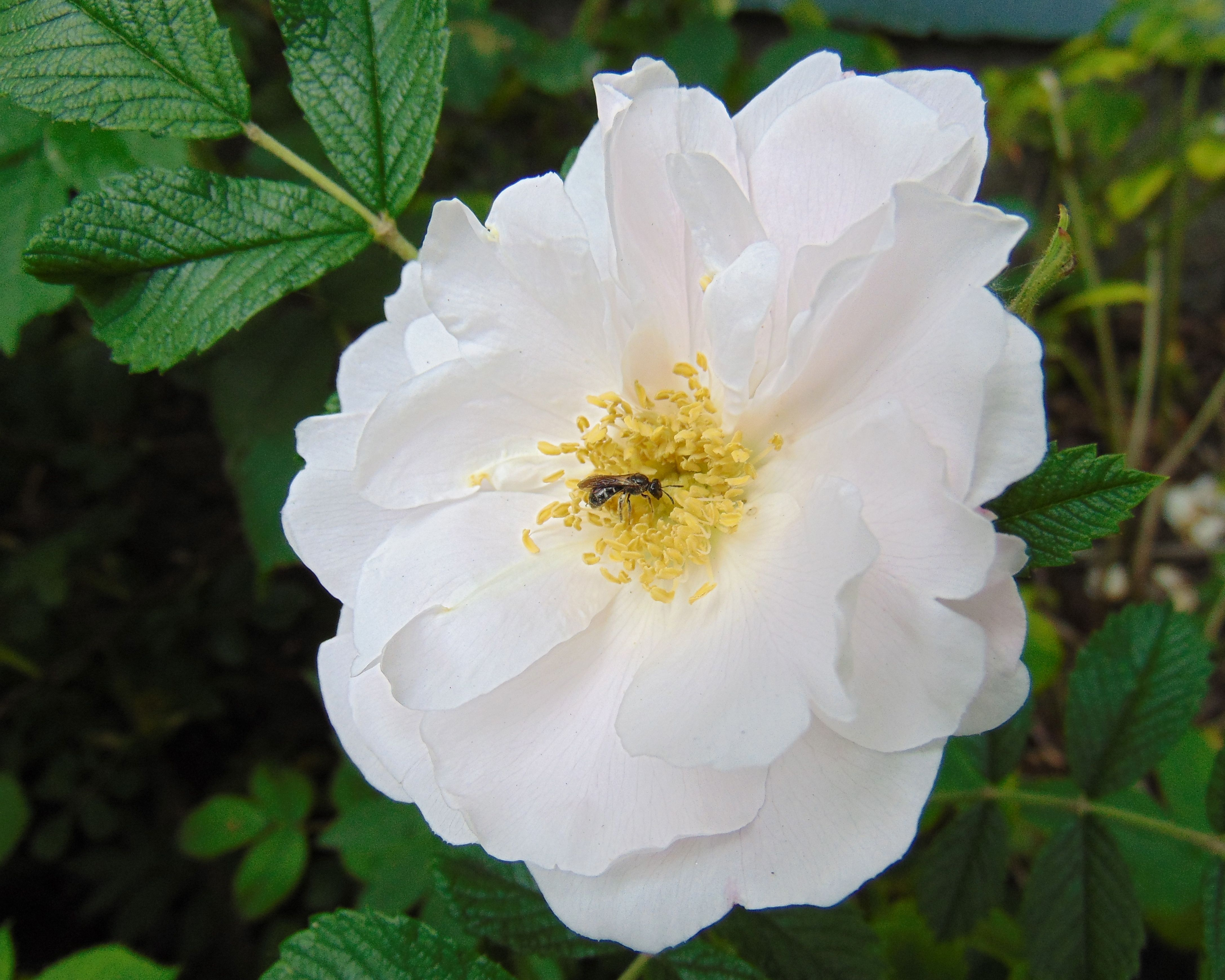
- Rosa 'Henry Hudson'
- Genus: Rosa hybrid
- Hybrid parentage: 'Schneezwerg' (open pollinated)
- Cultivar group: Hybrid rugosa
- Breeder: Felicitas Svejda
- Origin: Ottawa, Canada, 1979

Rosa 'Henry Hudson' is a white blend Hybrid rugosa cultivar, bred by Canadian rose breeder, Felicitas Svejda in 1966. It was introduced in Canada in 1979 by Agriculture and Agri-Food Canada. It is one of the Canadian Explorer roses that Svejda developed and named in honour of legendary Canadian explorers.

== Description ==
'Henry Hudson' is a medium, bushy Hybrid Rugosa rose, 2 to 4 ft (0.61–1.22 m) in height, with a 2 to 4 ft (0.61–1.22 m) spread. It has a double, flat bloom form of medium-sized 2.8 in (71 mm) flowers. Pink, rounded buds open to white flowers with shades of pink and yellow stamens. The rose has a strong, sweet scent. The rose will occasionally bloom later in the season. It has a dense growing habit and is very disease resistant. The leaves are rough and pale green, typical of most Rugosa roses.

== History ==
=== Felicitas Svejda ===
Felicitas Svejda was born November 8, 1920, in Vienna, Austria. She studied agricultural science at the University of Natural Resources and Life Sciences in Vienna, where she earned a PhD in 1948. She moved to Canada in 1953, and was hired by the Canadian Department of Agriculture's research division in Ottawa, Ontario. Her first project was researching cereal grains, but later began working with ornamental plants. Svejda was given a new project in 1961 to create a series of winter hardy roses, which would thrive in the coldest regions of Canada, with sub-freezing winter temperatures of -50 C, and would also flower regularly during Canada's short growing season.

With no prior knowledge of roses, Svejvda developed a successful rose-breeding program at the Central Experimental Farm (CEF) in Ottawa. From the 1960s to the 1980s, she introduced many new cultivars, including 22 roses in the Explorer Rose Series, named in honour of Canadian explorers. Some of her most popular cultivars are: 'John Cabot', 'Alexander MacKenzie', 'Henry Kelsey', and 'Jens Munk'. Svejvda led the rose-breeding program at CEF for 25 years, until her retirement in 1985. Her roses continued to be introduced in Canada well into the 1990s. Svejda died Jan. 19, 2016 in Ottawa at the age 95.

=== 'Henry Hudson' ===
Svejda bred 'Henry Hudson' in 1970 using two cycles of pollination with the Hybrid rugosa, 'Schneezwerg'. The rose cultivar was introduced in Canada in 1979 by Agriculture and Agri-Food Canada. It is one of the Explorer Roses that Svejda developed to withstand the harsh Canadian winters and thrive in its short growing season. The rose was named for Henry Hudson, a 17th-century British seaman and navigator who is best known for his explorations of Canada and the northeastern United States.

== Sources ==
- Quest-Ritson, Brigid; Quest-Ritson, Charles (2003). Encyclopedia of Roses. DK Publishing. ISBN 978-0756688684.
- Schneider, Peter (1995). Peter Schneider on Roses. Macmillan Publishing. ISBN 978-0028600383.
