= Rosa 'John Franklin' =

Red shrub rose cultivar

- Genus: Rosa hybrid
- Hybrid parentage: Rosa 'Lilli Marleen' seedling
- Cultivar group: Shrub rose
- Breeder: Felicitas Svejda
- Origin: Ottawa, Canada, 1979

Rosa 'John Franklin' is a red shrub rose cultivar, bred by Canadian rose breeder, Felicitas Svejda in 1970. It was introduced in Canada in 1979 by Agriculture and Agri-Food Canada. It is one of the least hardy of the Canadian Explorer roses that Svejda developed and named in honour of legendary Canadian explorers.

== Description ==
'John Franklin' is a medium upright, bushy shrub rose variety, 3 to 4 ft (0.91–1.22 m) in height, with a 3 to 4 ft (0.91–1.22 m) spread. It has double (16–25 petals), medium-sized 2.5 in (64 mm) flowers and a fringed, carnation-like bloom form. Blooms are crimson in colour and fade to dark pink as they age. Flowers are carried in clusters of 3–30 and have a slight musky fragrance. The plant has a dense, upright growth habit and glossy, dark green foliage. 'John Franklin' is susceptible to disease in warm climates, shade tolerant and occasionally repeats flowering during the season. Stems are moderately thorny. It is not very hardy in cold climates.

== History ==
=== Felicitas Svejda ===
Felicitas Svejda was born November 8, 1920, in Vienna, Austria. She studied agricultural science at the University of Natural Resources and Life Sciences in Vienna, where she earned a PhD in 1948. She moved to Canada in 1953, and was hired by the Canadian Department of Agriculture's research division in Ottawa, Ontario. Her first project was researching cereal grains, but later began working with ornamental plants. Svejda was given a new project in 1961 to create a series of winter hardy roses, which would thrive in the coldest regions of Canada, with sub-freezing winter temperatures of -50 C, and would also flower regularly during Canada's short growing season.

With no prior knowledge of roses, Svejvda developed a successful rose-breeding program at the Central Experimental Farm (CEF) in Ottawa. From the 1960s to the 1980s, she introduced many new cultivars, including 22 roses in the Explorer Rose Series, named in honour of Canadian explorers. Some of her most popular cultivars are: 'John Cabot', 'Alexander MacKenzie', 'David Thompson', and 'Jens Munk'. Svejvda led the rose-breeding program at CEF for 25 years, until her retirement in 1985. Her roses continued to be introduced in Canada well into the 1990s. Svejda died Jan. 19, 2016 in Ottawa at the age 95.

=== 'John Franklin' ===
Svejda developed 'John Franklin' in 1970 using a seedling of Rosa 'Lilli Marleen'. The rose cultivar was introduced in Canada in 1979 by Agriculture and Agri-Food Canada. It one of the Explorer Roses that Svejda developed to withstand the harsh Canadian winters and thrive in its short growing season. 'John Franklin' is named for English navigator and Arctic explorer, John Franklin (1786–1847), who, along with his crew, died trying to cross the Northwest Passage to Canada.
