= Griffith Buck =

American professor & horticulturist (1915-1991)

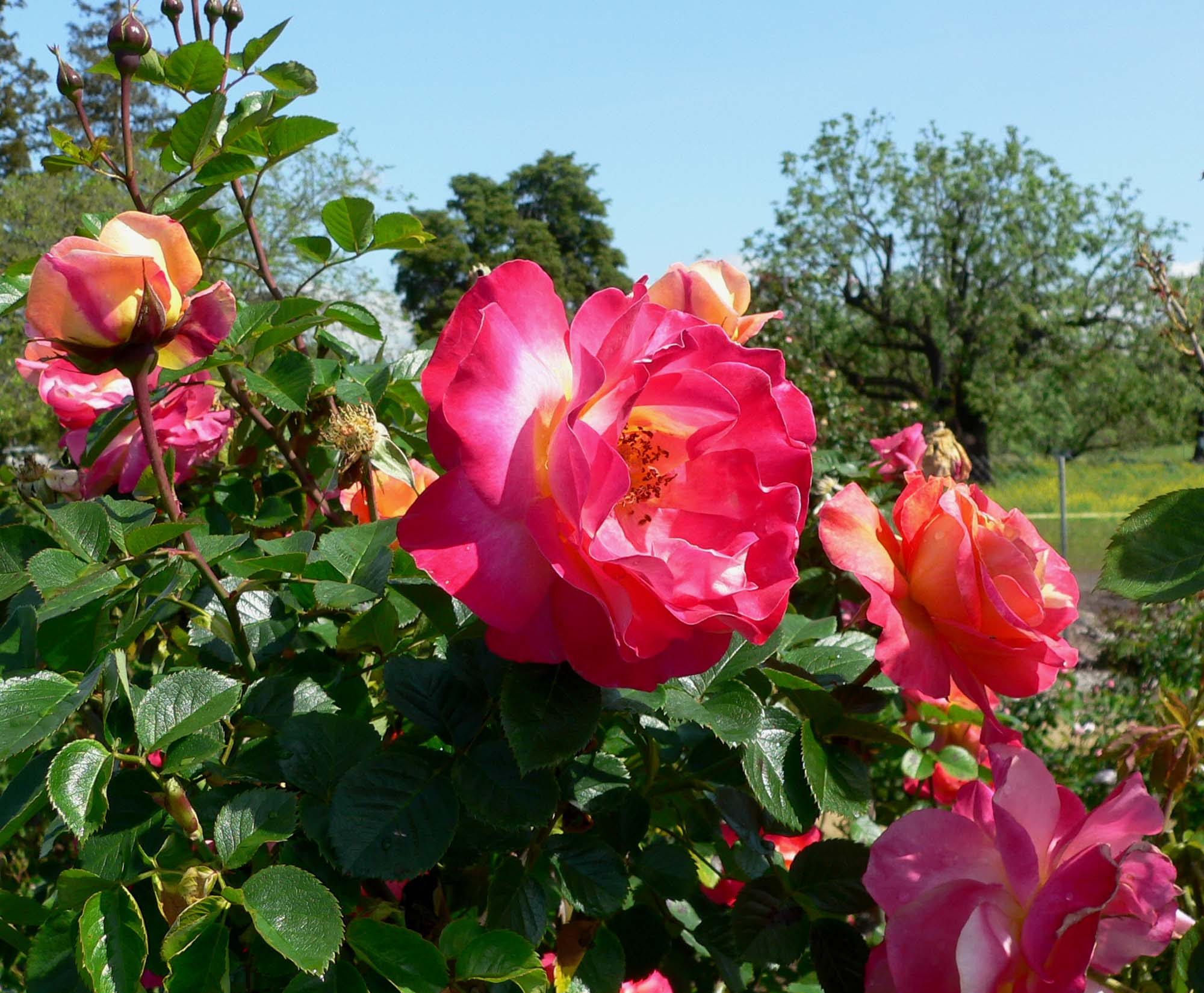
'Honeysweet', Buck 1984

Griffith J. Buck (1915 – 28 March 1991) was an American professor and a horticulturist. He taught horticulture at Iowa State University and he created over 80 named cultivars of the rose, all of which are capable of withstanding temperatures of -20 °F and need no pesticides or fungicides to thrive.

== Early life and education ==
Buck's introduction to rose breeding took place when he was a high school student in Rockford, Illinois, where he began a correspondence with the Spanish rose breeder Pedro Dot. After teaching for a few years, he entered the US Army during World War II as a member of the 13th Airborne, serving as a teacher and as a paratrooper in the European Theater.

Returning to civilian life, he enrolled at Iowa State University (ISU), receiving his B.S. degree in 1948, an M.S. in 1949, and a Ph.D. in 1953 in Horticulture and Microbiology. He then became a professor at the college.

== Breeding program ==
His breeding program was meant to address an ongoing issue: Wild rose species around the world were hardy and disease-free, but bloomed only once per year, and in a limited color range from white to medium pink. They were also quite large — sometimes 15 feet tall and equally wide. On the other hand, the hybrid tea roses developed during the 19th and 20th centuries flowered repeatedly on bushes of a manageable size, but were subject to a host of rose diseases and could not survive extremely cold temperatures. Buck's colleague Neils Hanson brought him cuttings of Rosa laxa 'Semipalatinsk' from Siberia and Buck crossed these with a variety of other species and cultivars. The German rose breeder Wilhelm Kordes also contributed to his breeding stock. Buck described his program in a 1985 speech: "My normal procedure was to grow the seedlings in the greenhouse one year until they got big enough, and plant them out the second spring. The only attention they would get would be water and cultivation. I didn't spray for disease."

His hybrids combined the best characteristics of both groups.

Buck often named his roses after friends — usually in an indirect way — and also chose names that have been described as reflecting "corn belt rural pleasures" such as 'Barn Dance', 'Applejack', and 'Prairie Sunrise'. The cultivars 'Spanish Rhapsody' and 'Sevilliana' commemorate his partnership with Pedro Dot.

The commercial trade in his rose cultivars got off to a slow start, since the university had no marketing infrastructure. The cultivars gained momentum during the 1980s and 1990s, along with the ecological movement. 'Carefree Beauty' was one of the first roses to receive Texas A&M's EarthKind designation. This rose is now grown at the Montreal Botanical Garden, Longwood Gardens in Pennsylvania, the Chicago Botanic Garden, and the Australian National Botanic Gardens.

== Collections ==
The largest collections of Buck roses are grown in the Griffith Buck Garden at Iowa State's Reiman Gardens. Other collections have been established at the Minnesota Landscape Arboretum and the Elko County Rose Garden in Elko, Nevada. "Buck roses" is a category used in the rose trade to indicate those roses that are cold-hardy and disease-free.

In 1997 the American Rose Society established the annual Griffith Buck Memorial Rose Trophy.

== Gallery ==
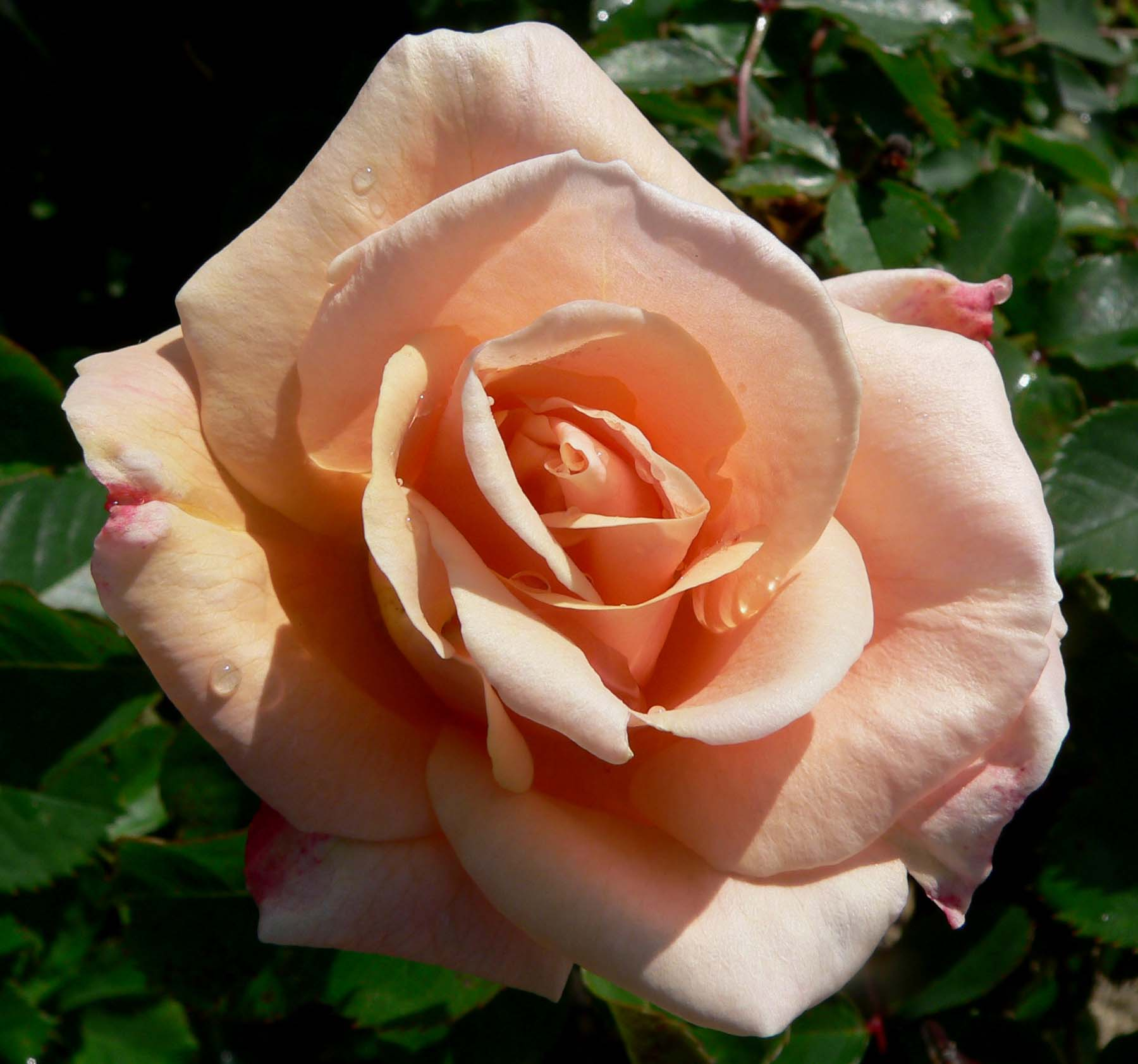
'Folksinger', Buck 1984

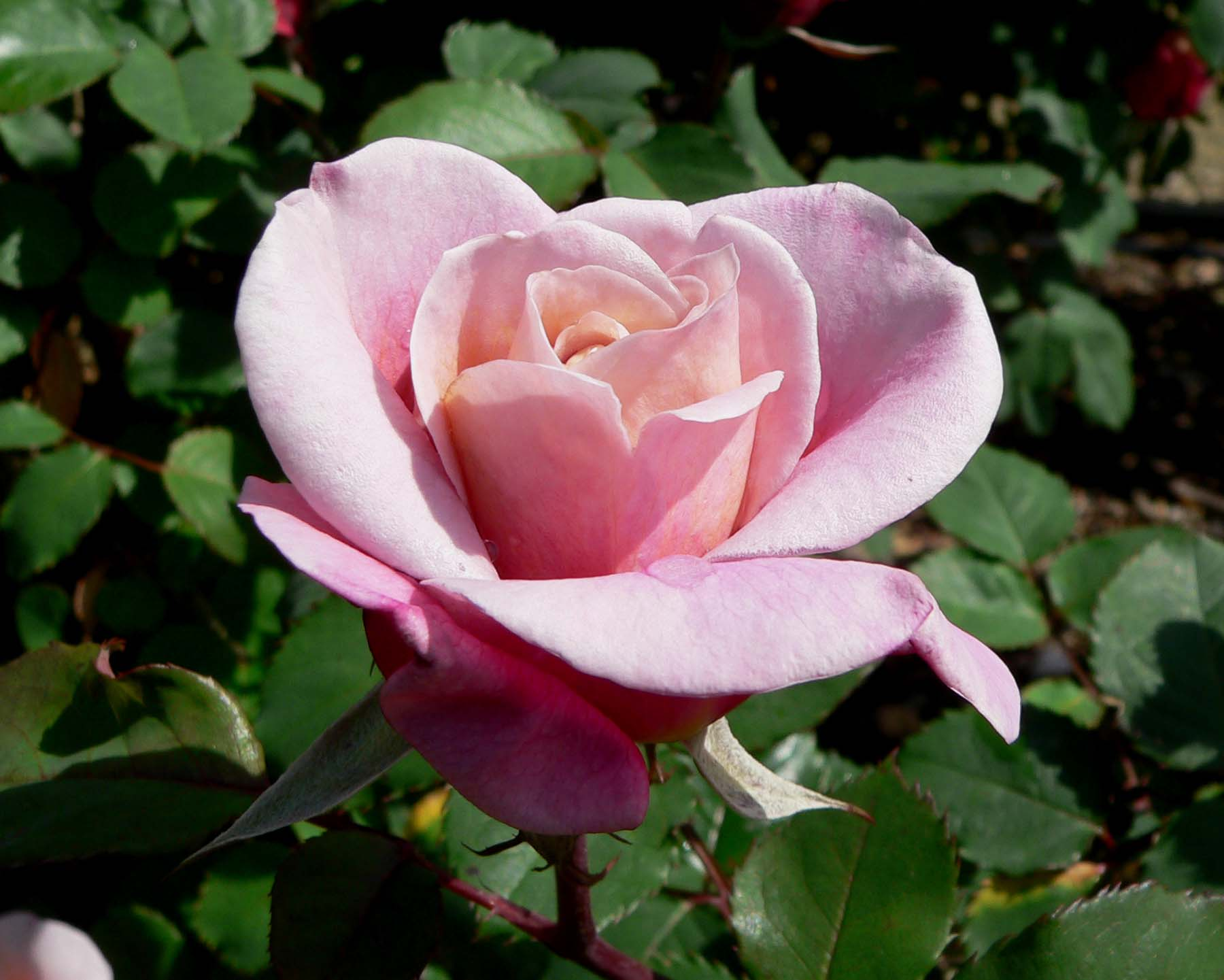
'Distant Drums', Buck 1984
