= DTSS =

DTSS may refer to:

- Downtown Silver Spring
- David Thompson Secondary School (disambiguation), several in British Columbia, Canada
- Digital Time Synchronization Service
- Dartmouth Time-Sharing System
- Digital Time-Stamping Service
