= David Thomson =

David Thomson may refer to:

== Business ==
- David Couper Thomson (1861–1954), Scottish publisher, founder of D. C. Thomson & Co.
- David Kinnear Thomson (1910–1992), Scottish businessman
- David Thomson, 3rd Baron Thomson of Fleet (born 1957), Canadian businessman

== Entertainment ==
- David Thomson (film critic) (born 1941), American-based British film critic
- David Thomson (writer) (1914–1988), writer and radio producer
- Dave Thomson (born 1982/83), Canadian songwriter, record producer and former member of Wave

== Politics ==
- David Thomson (Labor Party politician) (1856–1926), Australian politician
- David Thomson (New Zealand politician) (1915–1999), New Zealand politician
- David Thomson (Australian National Party politician) (1924–2013), Australian politician

== Sports ==
- David Thomson (footballer, born 1847) (1847–1876), Welsh international footballer
- David Thomson (footballer, born 1892) (1892–?), Scottish footballer (Dundee FC and Scotland)
- Dave Thomson (footballer, born 1938) (1938–2016), Scottish football player for Dunfermline Athletic
- Dave Thomson (footballer, born 1943) (1942–2019), Scottish footballer (Rochester Lancers and Toronto Metros)
- Dave Thomson (hammer thrower) (born c. 1959), American hammer thrower, two-time All-American for the Stanford Cardinal track and field team

== Other ==
- David Thomson (bishop) (born 1952), Bishop of Huntingdon
- David Thomson (historian) (1912–1970), English historian
- David and Mary Thomson (1760–1834), Scottish immigrants, first official European settlers in what became Scarborough, Ontario
- David Cleghorn Thomson (1900–1980), Scottish journalist, author and politician
- David Landsborough Thomson (1901–1964), Canadian biochemist
- David J. Thomson, professor of statistics
- David K. Thomson (born 1960s), judge in New Mexico
- David Thomson (physicist) (1817-1880) Scottish physicist

== See also ==
- David Thompson (disambiguation)
