= Felicitas Svejda =

Canadian scientist

- Born: November 8, 1920; Vienna, Austria
- Died: January 19, 2016 (aged 95); Ottawa
- Education: PhD
- Alma mater: University of Natural Resources and Life Sciences, Vienna
- Known for: Creator of the explorer roses
- Scientific career
- Fields: Genetics
- Institutions: Central Experimental Farm, Agriculture Canada

Felicitas Svejda (November 8, 1920 – January 19, 2016) was a federal scientist in Canada who developed roses that could survive Canada's short growing season and bitter winter conditions. She led the rose-breeding program at the Central Experimental Farm in Ottawa, Ontario, Canada (now Agriculture and Agri-Food Canada) for nearly 25 years. She developed the Explorer Rose Series named in honour of Canadian explorers. Many of her roses also thrive in Finland, Russia, Iceland, Germany and Austria.

== Biography ==
Felicitas Svejda was born November 8, 1920, in Vienna, Austria. She obtained her Ph.D. in agricultural science in 1948 from the University of Natural Resources and Life Sciences (Hochschule fur Bodenkultur) in Vienna. She later moved to Canada in 1953 and settled in Ottawa, Ontario. She died on January 19, 2016, at the age of 95, in the city of Ottawa from brief complications following Alzheimer's disease.

== Career ==
After graduation, Svejda remained at the university in Vienna where she worked as a research assistant in agricultural economics from 1947-1951. She then moved to Sweden to work at the Swedish Association of Seed Selection for a year. When she moved to Canada she worked for the federal government's Department of Agriculture (now Agriculture and Agri-Food Canada) as a statistician in the cereal division from 1953-1961 before accepting the position in ornamental plant breeding.

The Canadian Explorer Rose series, developed by Svejda, made the Central Experimental Farm famous for rose breeding by creating a plant both hardy and recurrently blooming.

In 1961 she reactivated the rose breeding program in Ottawa aimed to develop completely winter-hardy, recurrent-flowering varieties. She also sought varieties resistant to black spot and mildew, and ones with good ornamental features of flower and shrub. The rose varieties available in Canada in 1961 could not survive without winter protection outside the warmer conditions of southern Ontario (Niagara Peninsula) and the coast of British Columbia. Armed with patience and determination, Svejda managed to succeed in developing a first variety with these characteristics after 8 years.

In 1968 she launched the first national trial of ornamental shrubs in Canada whereby she sent her roses and other plants to locations across North America to test their survival rates in local climates. The Explorer rose series includes 25 different varieties released between 1968 and 1999; 13 developed during her career, the remainder developed by the program after her retirement. The Explorer Roses are winter hardy, recurrent-flowering, disease-resistant plants that have made their way into park gardens and backyards all over Canada. Some of the hardier cultivars are also grown in Finland, Russia, Iceland, Germany and her homeland of Austria, and have been adapted by others for harsh climates such as the Nevada desert. The Explorer Roses include: 'Alexander MacKenzie', 'Captain Samuel Holland', David Thompson, 'Jens Munk', and 'John Cabot'. Svejda also worked with ornamental shrubs; five weigelias named after dances [Minuet, Rumba, Samba, Tango and Polka], robust forsythias Northern Gold and Happy Centennial, and three mock oranges including Buckley's Quill.

== Honours and awards ==
Svejda received several awards and recognitions. She received a certificate of merit from the Royal National Rose Society of Great Britain (1985) and the Canadian Ornamental Plant Foundation (1999), the prestigious Portland Gold Medal (2004), and an honorary Doctorate of Science from York University, Toronto (2000) for her scientific career and contributions to ornamental horticulture. She was also the honorary patron of the Canadian Rose Society.

The "Explorer Rose Garden" was planted in 2005 at the Central Experimental Farm in Ottawa to proudly display the results of her research. It combines plants from the original collection as well as more recent varieties. Svejda was a special guest at the official opening ceremony.

In 2010, she generously donated her personal records, correspondence, and library to the Montreal Botanical Garden Library. The Felicitas Svejda: Scientist and rosarian collection is available online.

== Selected roses ==
- 'John Cabot', (1978)
- 'Alexander MacKenzie', (1985)
- 'Captain Samuel Holland', (1991)
- 'Jens Munk', (1979)
- 'Henry Hudson', (1976)
- 'Henry Kelsey', (1984)
- 'David Thompson', (1979)
- 'John Franklin', (1979)
- 'Champlain', (1982)
- 'John Davis', (1986)
- 'J.P. Connell', (1986)
- 'William Baffin', (1983)
- 'Frontenac', (1992)
- 'Lambert Closse', (1992)

== Rose gallery ==
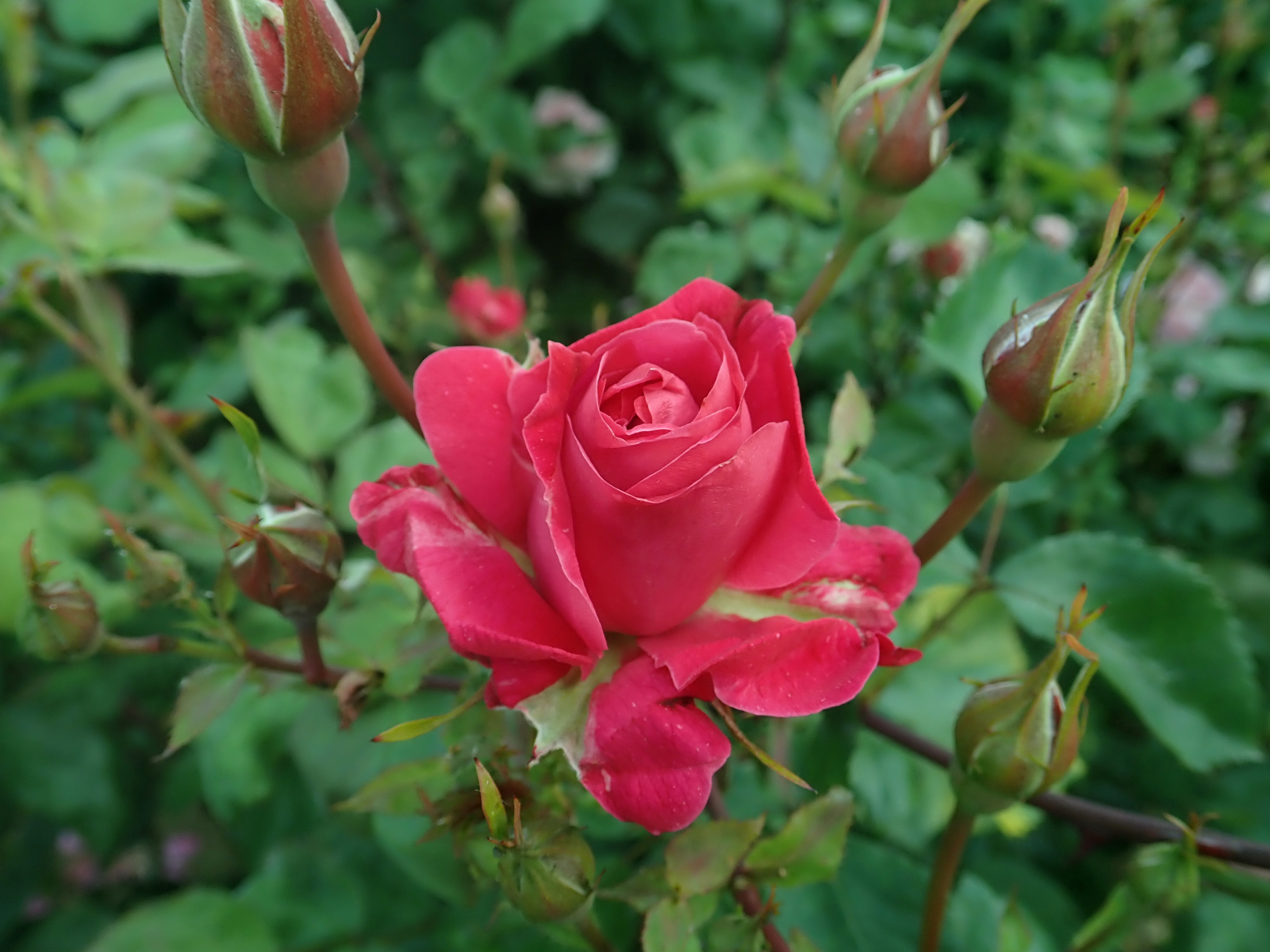
'Alexander MacKenzie'

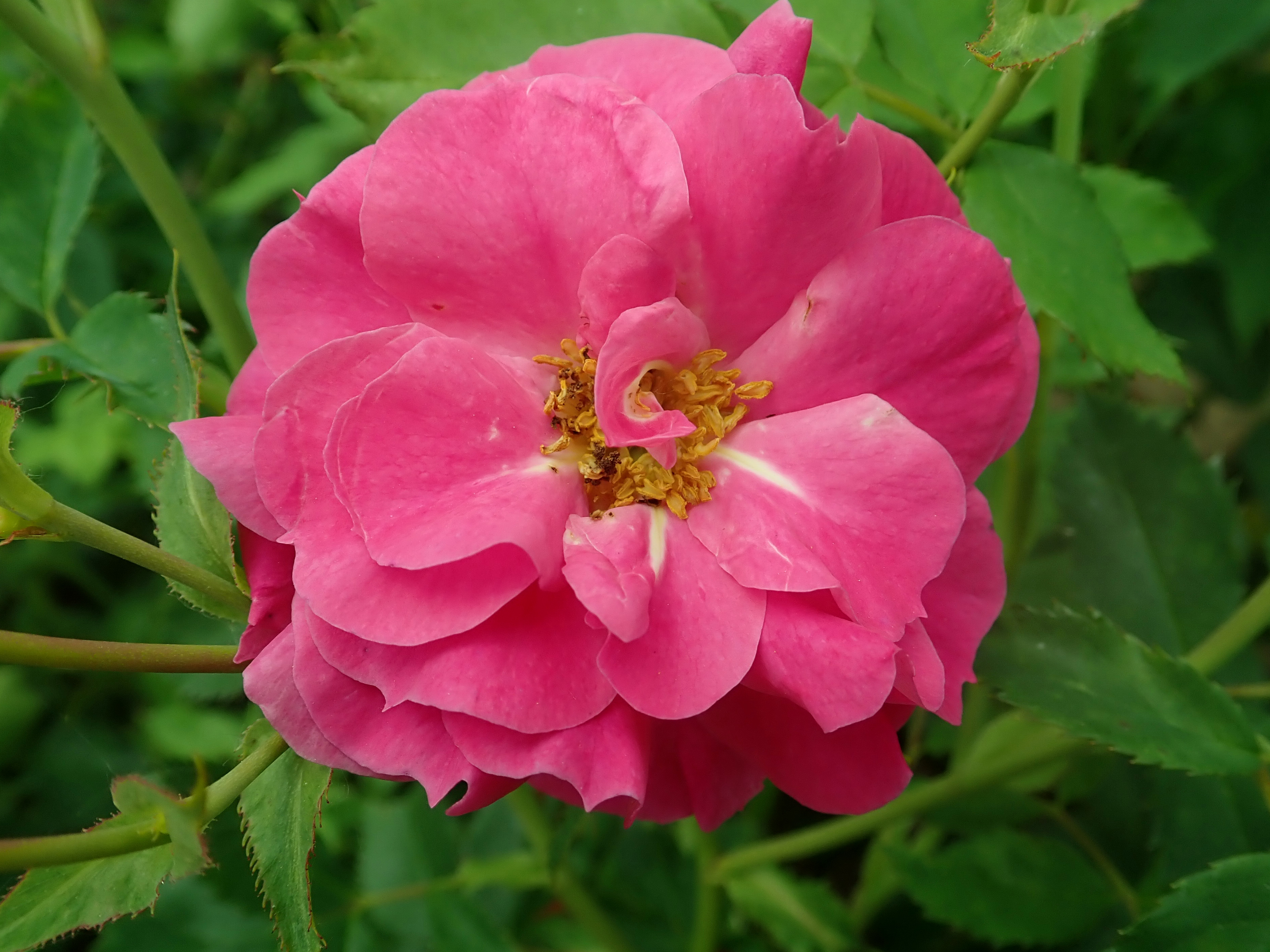
'Captain Samuel Holland'

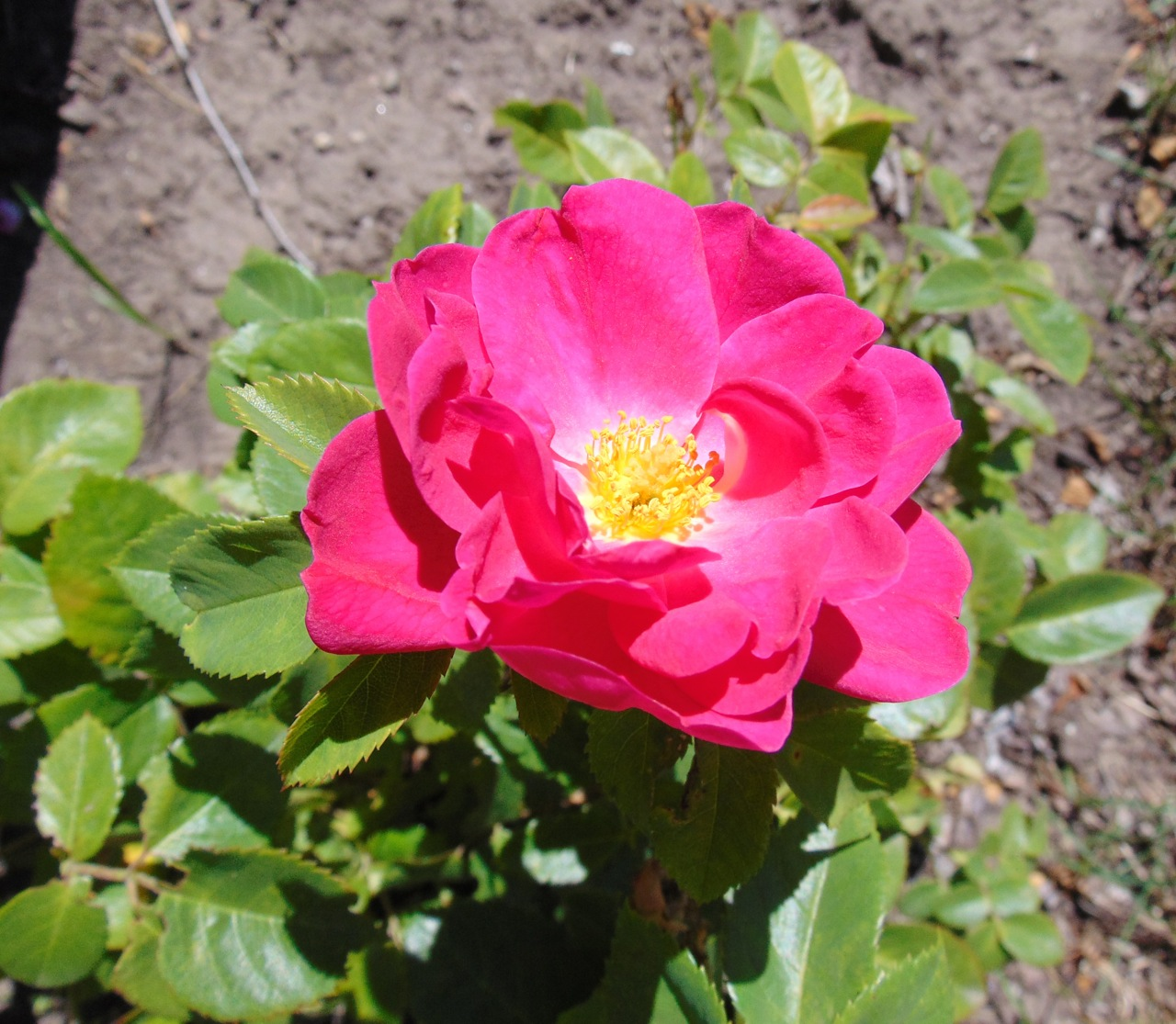
'John Cabot'

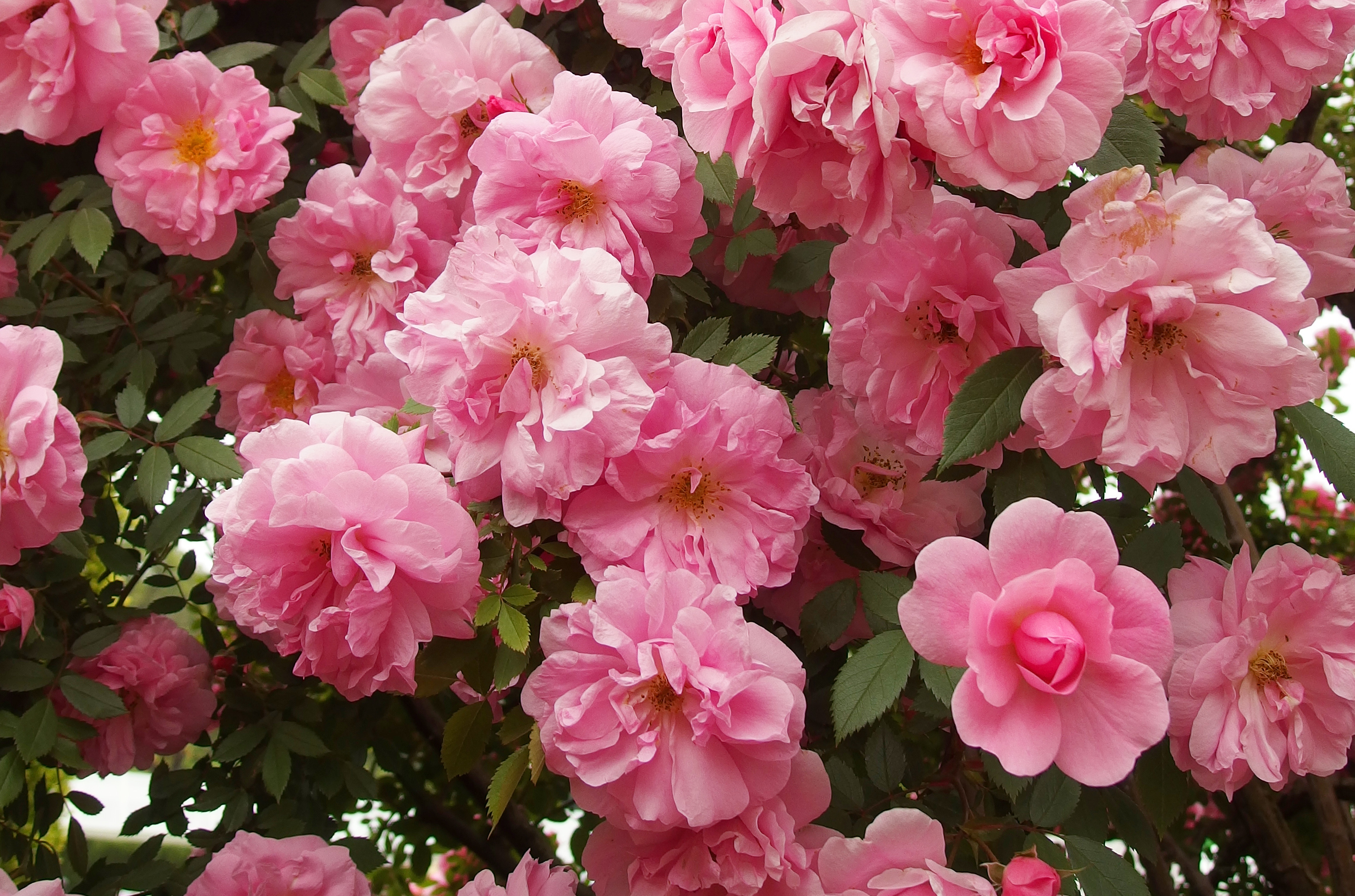
'John Davis'

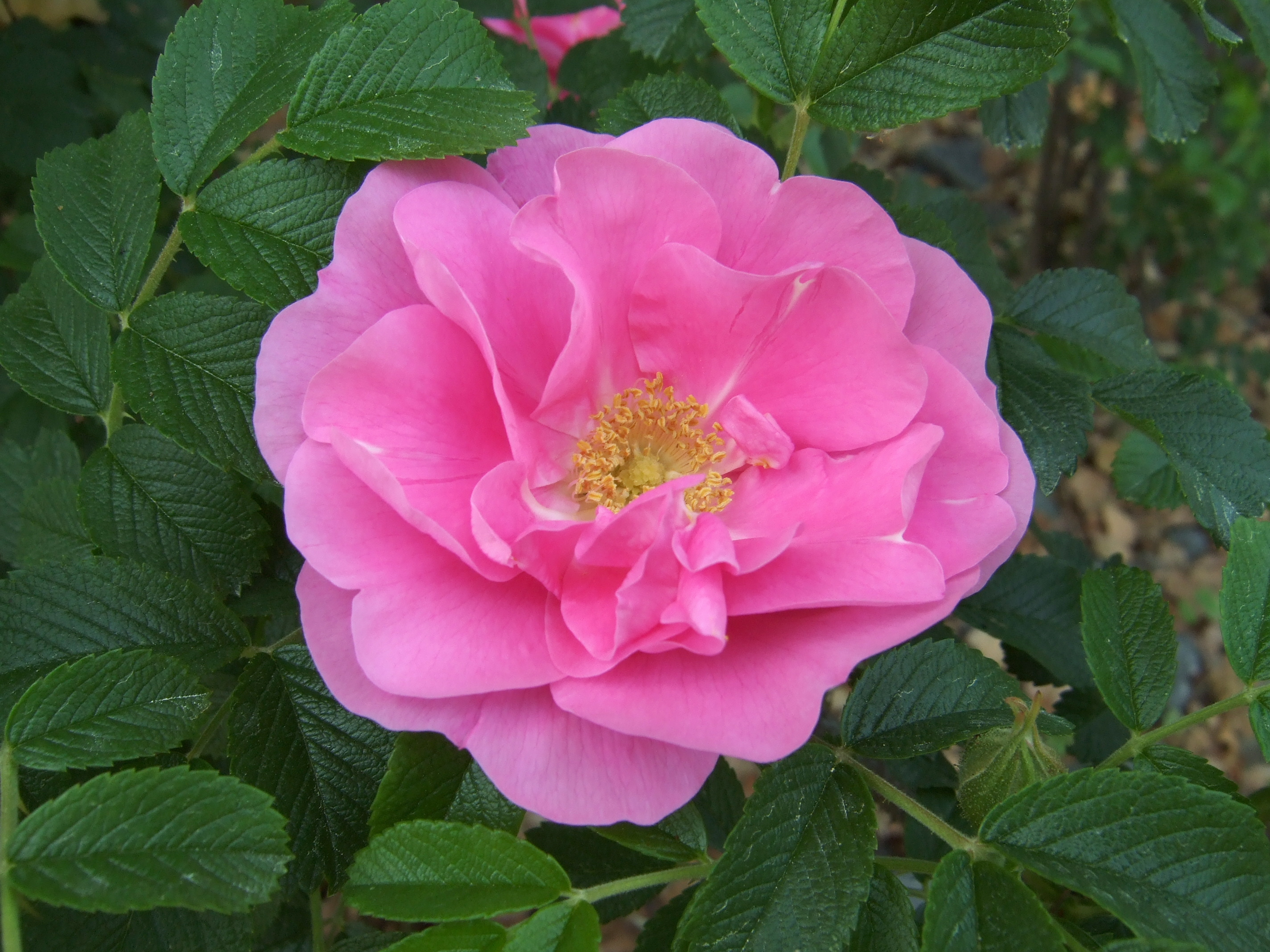
'Jens Munk'
