= David Thompson (nurse) =

British nurse

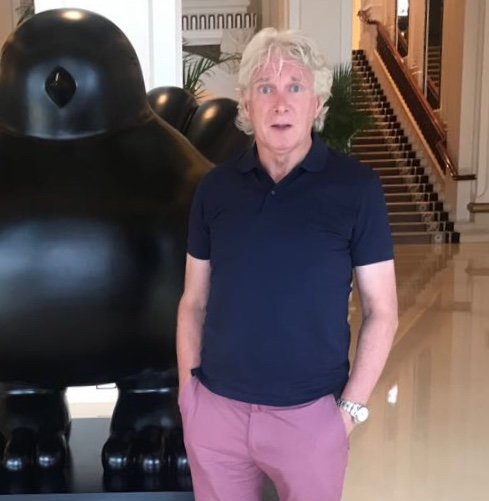
- Born: David Robert Thompson; 10 February 1955 (age 71); Bradford, England, UK
- Known for: Research into Cardiovascular nursing

Academic background
- Education: Loughborough University; Keele University; University of Hull

Academic work
- Discipline: Nursing
- Institutions: Queen's University Belfast
- Website: pure.qub.ac.uk/portal/en/persons/david-thompson(f8c3bdf4-6992-43a6-bfa9-349f855e9aa6).html

David Robert Thompson (born 10 February 1955) is a British academic nurse and psychologist. He is professor of nursing at Queen's University Belfast. He holds honorary and adjunct professorial positions in the United Kingdom, Ireland, China and Australia and is an editor of European Journal of Cardiovascular Nursing. He served as a panel member of the 2001 UK Research Assessment Exercise and as a sub panel member of the 2021 UK Research Excellence Framework and as a sub panel member of the 2008 UK Research Assessment Exercise. He was the first nurse to be elected a member of the British Cardiovascular Society (formerly the British Cardiac Society).

== Education ==
Thompson is a Registered Nurse and holds a BSc in nursing from the CNAA, a PhD in psychology from Loughborough University, an MA in policy from Loughborough University, a Postgraduate Diploma in Medical Social Anthropology from Keele University, and an MBA from the University of Hull.

== Professional life ==
Thompson's clinical area is cardiovascular nursing and his specialty is cardiovascular disease prevention and rehabilitation, fields in which he has worked since 1980. He was the lead author of the first series of studies to examine circadian rhythms of chest pain in myocardial infarction. Between 1998-2001 Thompson was the only person ever to serve as Professor of Nursing Research at the United Kingdom Department of Health and Social Care.

== Awards and recognition ==
Thompson holds fellowships of the Royal College of Nursing (1992) the American Academy of Nursing the Cardiac Society of Australia and New Zealand, the European Society of Cardiology and the Florence Nightingale Foundation. He is an Associate Fellow of the British Psychological Society. Thompson is a Member of the Academia Europaea (2019) and of the European Academy of Sciences and Arts.

== Personal life ==
Thompson is an avid collector of Asian, Australian, British and European art and British, Chinese and Japanese pottery. He is married to Chantal Ski and has two sons and two grandsons.

== Bibliography ==
Thompson has over 600 publications listed on Web of Science that have been cited more than 15,000 times, giving him an h-index of 60. His three most-cited articles are:

- Taylor, RS; Brown, A; Ebrahim, S; Joliffe, J; Noorani, H; Rees, K; Skidmore, B; Stone, JA; Thompson, DR; Oldridge, N (2004). "Exercise-based rehabilitation for patients with coronary heart disease: Systematic review and meta-analysis of randomized controlled trials". American Journal of Medicine. 116 (10): 682–692. doi:10.1016/j.amjmed.2004.01.009. PMID 15121495.
- Anderson, L; Thompson, DR; Oldgridge, N; Swizler, AD; Rees, K; Martin, N; Taylor, RS (2016). "Exercise-based cardiac rehabilitation for coronary heart disease". Cochrane Database of Systematic Reviews. 2016 (2) CD001800. doi:10.1002/14651858.CD001800.pub3. PMC 6491180. PMID 26730878.
- Mayou, RA; Gill, D; Thompson, DR; Hicks, N; Neil, A (2000). "Depression and anxiety as predictors of outcome after myocardial infarction". Psychosomatic Medicine. 62 (102): 212–219. doi:10.1097/00006842-200003000-00011. PMID 10772399. S2CID 23434781.
