= Rosa 'Henry Kelsey' =

Bright red Hybrid Kordesii rose cultivar

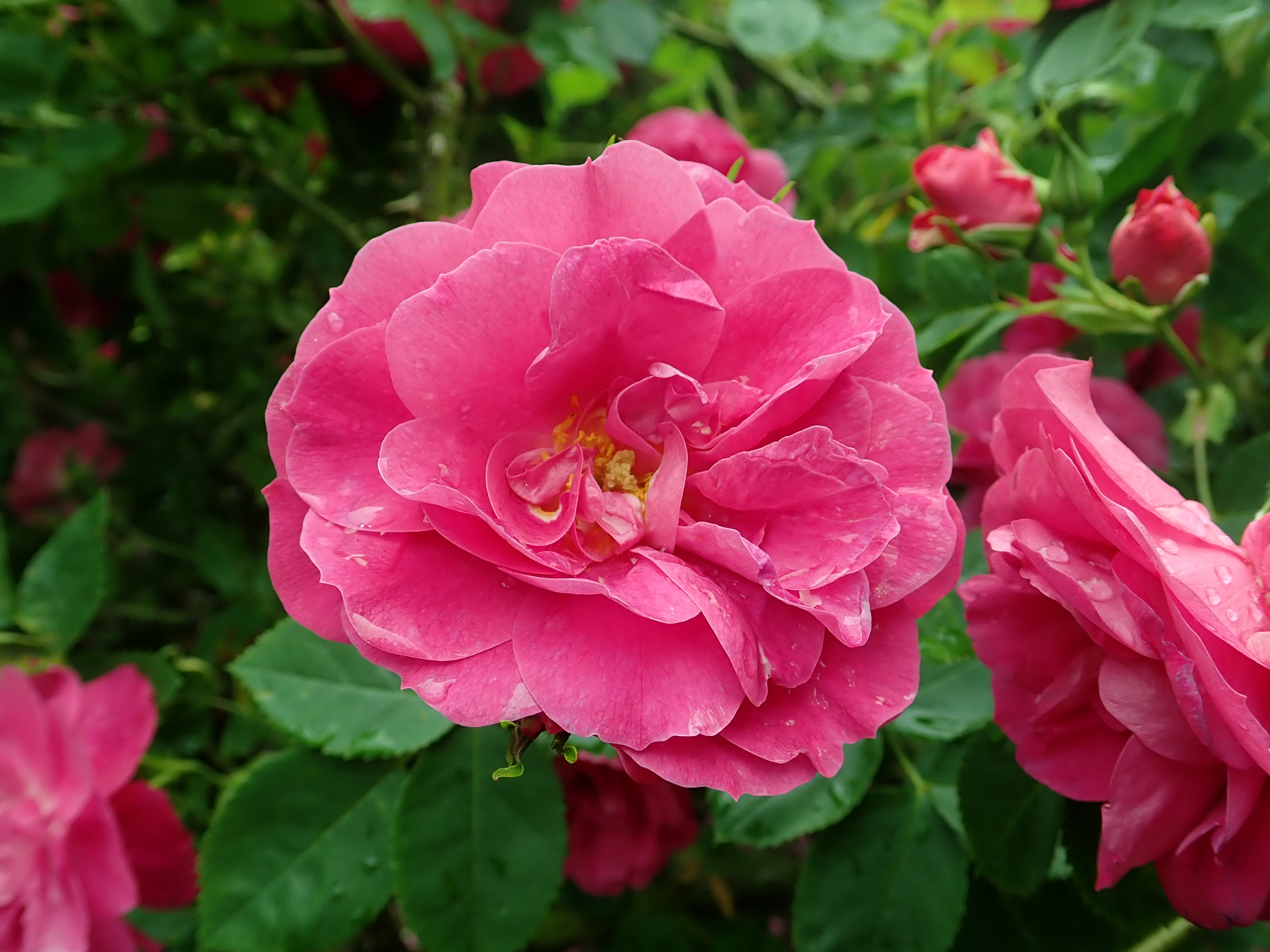
- Rosa 'Henry Kelsey'
- Genus: Rosa hybrid
- Hybrid parentage: 'Kordesii' x 'Unnamed Seedling'
- Cultivar group: Hybrid Kordesii rose
- Breeder: Felicitas Svejda
- Origin: Ottawa, Canada, 1984

Rosa 'Henry Kelsey' is a bright red, Hybrid Kordesii rose cultivar, bred by Canadian rose breeder, Felicitas Svejda. It was introduced in Canada in 1984 by Agriculture and Agri-Food Canada. It is one of the tallest of the Canadian Explorer roses that Svejda developed and named in honour of legendary Canadian explorers.

== Description ==
'Henry Kelsey' is a tall, climbing Hybrid Kordesii rose variety, 4 to 9 ft (1.2–2.7 m) in height, with a 5 ft (1.5 m) spread. It has a high-centered, semi-double cupped bloom form of medium-sized 3 in (76 mm), bright crimson petals with golden stamens. The rose has a strong, fruity scent. It blooms in medium-sized clusters of 5–15 flowers. The first flowering is profuse and the plant will then flower occasionally throughout the season but in smaller numbers. It is susceptible to blackspot. 'Henry Kelsey' has abundant thorns and prickles and dark green, glossy foliage. In warmer climates, the rose can be grown as a climber, and will reach up to 13 ft (4.0 m).

== History ==
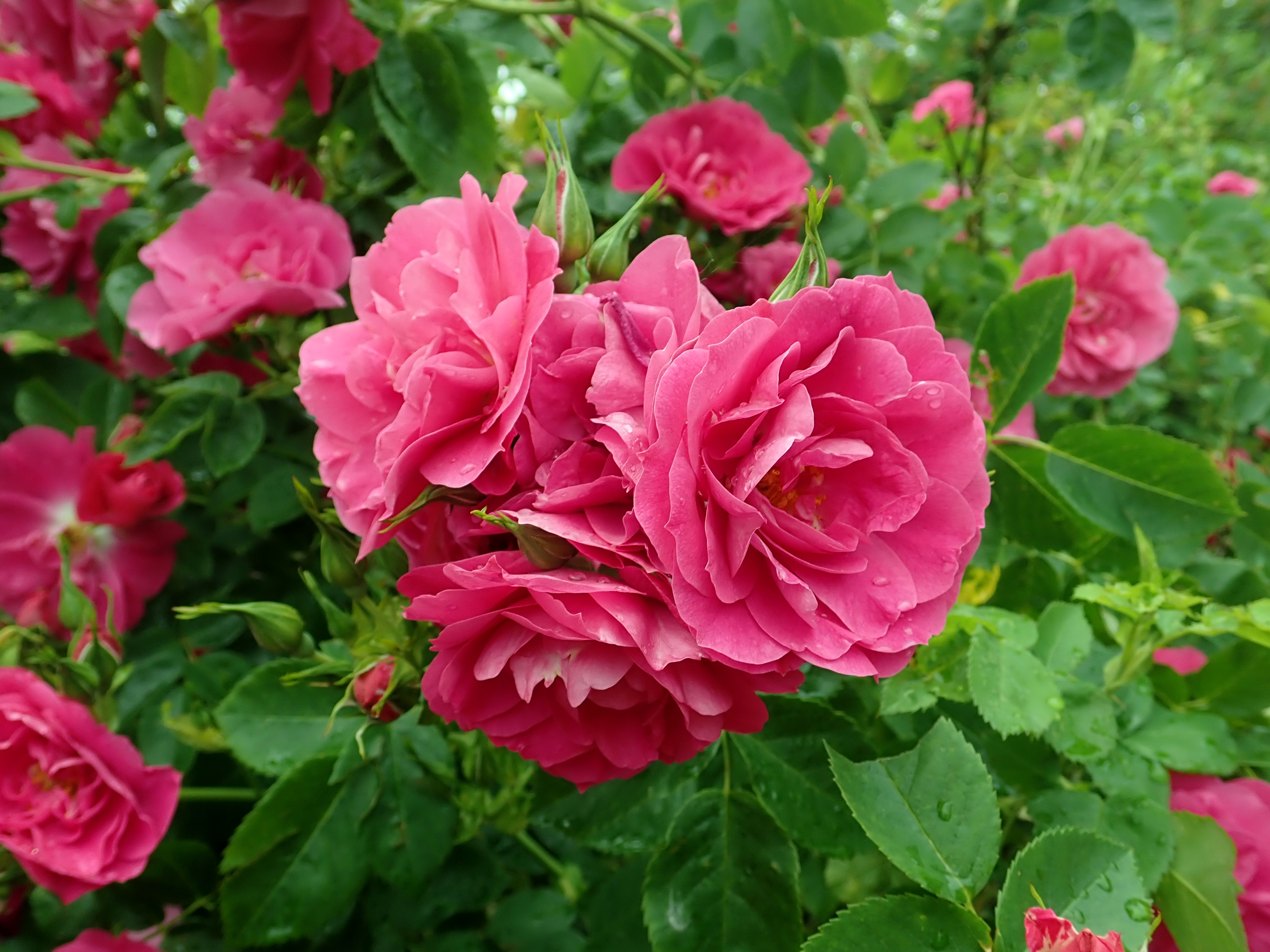
'Henry Kelsey'

=== Felicitas Svejda ===
Felicitas Svejda was born November 8, 1920, in Vienna, Austria. She studied agricultural science at the University of Natural Resources and Life Sciences in Vienna, where she earned a PhD in 1948. She moved to Canada in 1953, and was hired by the Canadian Department of Agriculture's research division in Ottawa, Ontario. Her first project was researching cereal grains, but later began working with ornamental plants. Svejda was given a new project in 1961 to create a series of winter hardy roses, which would thrive in the coldest regions of Canada, with sub-freezing winter temperatures of -50 C, and would also flower regularly during Canada's short growing season.

With no prior knowledge of roses, Svejvda developed a successful rose-breeding program at the Central Experimental Farm (CEF) in Ottawa. From the 1960s to the 1980s, she introduced many new cultivars, including 22 roses in the Explorer Rose Series, named in honour of Canadian explorers. Some of her most popular cultivars are: 'John Cabot', 'Alexander MacKenzie', 'David Thompson', and 'Jens Munk'. Svejvda led the rose-breeding program at CEF for 25 years, until her retirement in 1985. Her roses continued to be introduced in Canada well into the 1990s. Svejda died Jan. 19, 2016 in Ottawa at the age 95.

=== 'Henry Kelsey' ===
Svejda bred 'Henry Kelsey' before 1984 by crossing 'Kordesii' and an 'Unnamed Seedling. The rose cultivar was introduced in Canada in 1984 by Agriculture and Agri-Food Canada. It is one of the Explorer Roses that Svejda developed to withstand the harsh Canadian winters and thrive in its short growing season. It is named for Henry Kelsey, the English fur trader, explorer, and seaman who was instrumental in establishing the Hudson's Bay Company in Canada. 'Henry Kelsey' was used to develop one child plant, the large-flowered climber, 'Ramblin Red'.

== Sources ==
- Quest-Ritson, Brigid; Quest-Ritson, Charles (2003). Encyclopedia of Roses. DK Publishing. ISBN 978-0756688684.
- Schneider, Peter (1995). Peter Schneider on Roses. Macmillan Publishing. ISBN 978-0028600383.
