= David Thompson (cricketer) =

English cricketer (born 1976)

Personal information
- Full name: David James Jonathan Thompson
- Born: 11 March 1976 (age 50); Wandsworth, London
- Batting: Right-handed
- Bowling: Right-arm fast

Domestic team information
- Years: Team
- 1992–2002: Essex
- Lancashire
- Surrey

Career statistics
Competition	First-class	List A
Matches	11	3
Runs scored	109	2
Batting average	8.38	2
100s/50s	0/0	0/0
Top score	22	1*
Balls bowled	914	67
Wickets	29	2
Bowling average	31.51	33.50
5 wickets in innings	0	0
10 wickets in match	0	0
Best bowling	4/46	2/34
Catches/stumpings	1/–	0/–
- Source: CricInfo, 30 July 2011

David James Jonathan Thompson (born 11 March 1976) is a former English cricketer active from 1994 to 2000 who played for Surrey and Essex. He appeared in eleven first-class matches as a righthanded batsman who bowled right arm medium-fast pace. He scored 109 runs with a highest score of 22 and held one catch. He took 29 wickets with a best analysis of four for 46.
