= David Thompson Secondary School =

David Thompson Secondary School may refer to:

- David Thompson Secondary School (Vancouver), British Columbia, Canada
- David Thompson Secondary School (Invermere), British Columbia, Canada
