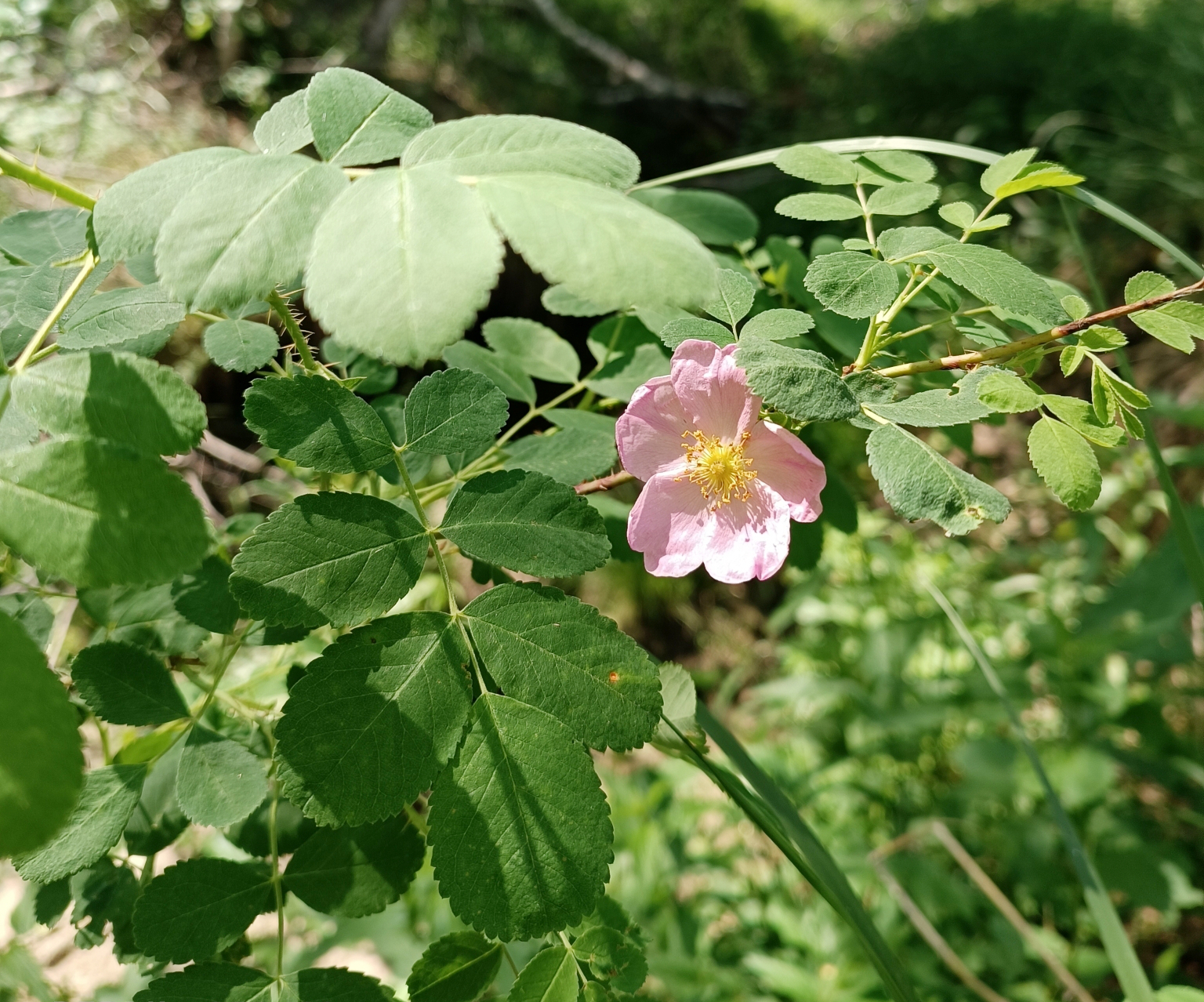
- Flowers can be white or pink
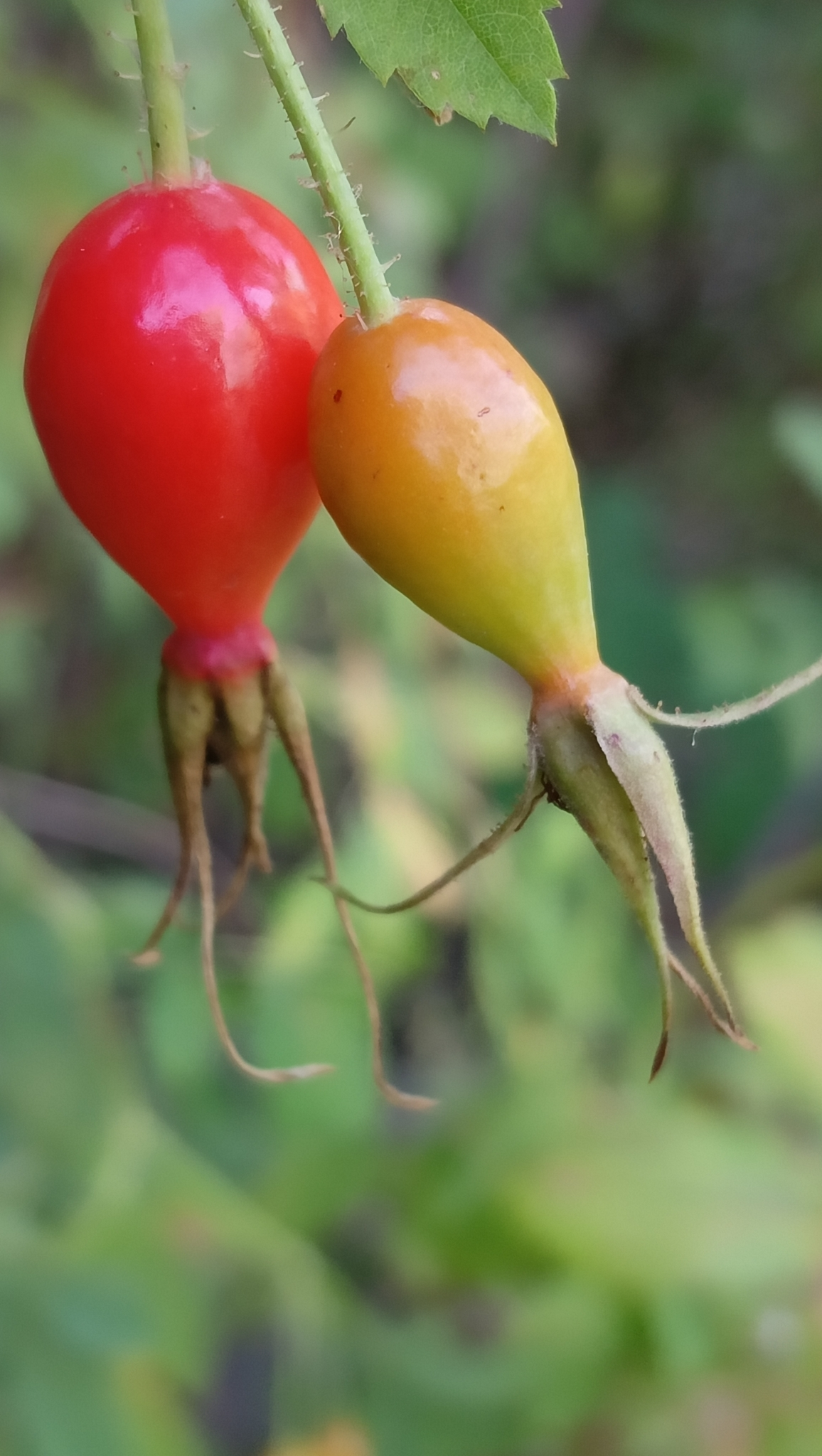
- Sepals persist on the hips

Scientific classification
- Kingdom: Plantae
- Clade: Tracheophytes
- Clade: Angiosperms
- Clade: Eudicots
- Clade: Rosids
- Order: Rosales
- Family: Rosaceae
- Genus: Rosa
- Species: R. laxa

Binomial name
- Rosa laxa Retz.

Synonyms
- List: Rosa gebleriana Schrenk; Rosa gebleriana var. glabra Trautv.; Rosa gebleriana var. puberula Trautv.; Rosa incana Falk; Rosa kaschgarica Rupr.; Rosa laxa var. alatavica Regel; Rosa laxa var. glabra C.A.Mey.; Rosa laxa var. incana Falk ex Wikstr.; Rosa laxa var. karatavica Regel; Rosa laxa var. kaschgarica (Rupr.) Y.L.Han; Rosa laxa var. pubescens C.A.Mey.; Rosa laxa var. sewerzowii Regel; Rosa songarica Bunge; Rosa songarica var. microcarpa Rupr.; Rosa songarica var. puberula (Trautv.) Regel; Rosa songarica var. typica Regelpubl.

= Rosa laxa =

Species of plant

Rosa laxa is a species of flowering plant in the family Rosaceae. It is native to western Siberia, the Altai, Kazakhstan, Kyrgyzstan, Mongolia, and northern China. A shrub reaching 2 m (7 ft), it is typically found in a variety of wetter habitats; Populus woodlands, scrublands, meadows, valleys, and riversides at elevations from 500 to 1,500 m (1,600 to 4,900 ft).

== Subtaxa ==
The following varieties are currently accepted:

- Rosa laxa var. laxa – entire range
- Rosa laxa var. mollis T.T.Yu & T.C.Ku – northern Xinjiang
