= Rosa 'John Cabot' =

Pink hybrid Kordesii shrub rose cultivar

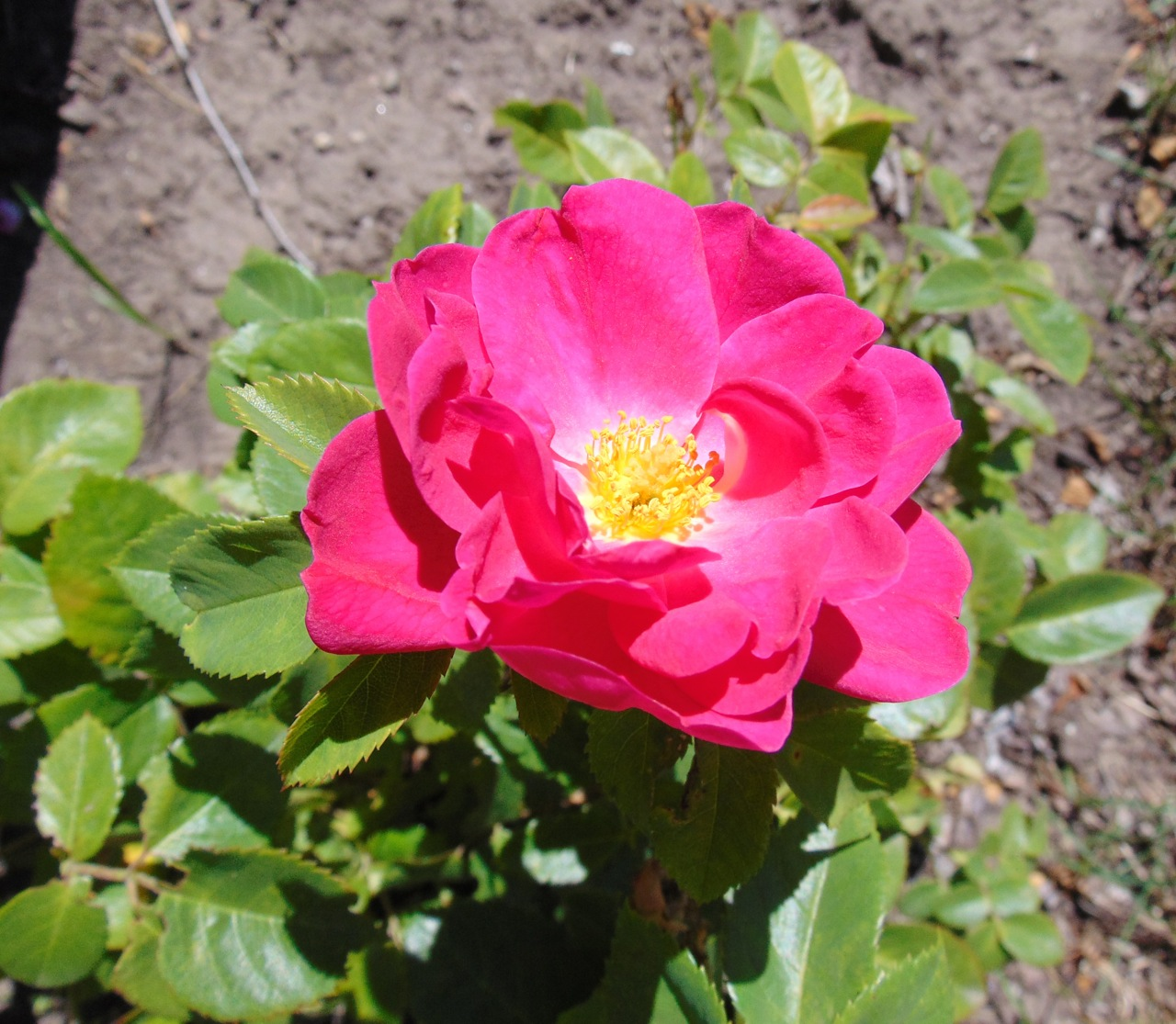
- Rosa 'John Cabot'
- Genus: Rosa hybrid
- Hybrid parentage: Rosa 'Kordesii' × ('Masquerade' × Rosa laxa)
- Cultivar group: Hybrid Kordesii, Shrub
- Breeder: Felicitas Svejda
- Origin: Ottawa, Canada, 1978

Rosa 'John Cabot' is a dark pink Hybrid Kordesii, shrub rose, bred by Canadian rose breeder, Felicitas Svejda in 1969. It was introduced in Canada in 1978 by Agriculture and Agri-Food Canada. It was the first of the Canadian Explorer roses that Svejda developed and named in honour of legendary Canadian explorers.

== Description ==
'John Cabot' is a tall, bushy hybrid Kordesii shrub rose, 5 to 8 ft (1.5–2.4 m) in height, with a 5 to 7 ft (1.5–2.1 m) spread. It has a double (17–25) cupped, bloom form of medium-sized 2.8 in (71 mm) petals. Flower color ranges from dark pink to reddish-purple, sometimes with streaks of white, and the colour fades as blooms age. Flowers are borne in clusters of 3–10. 'John Cabot' flowers abundantly in the first seven weeks of the season, then occasionally until the autumn, when it has a final, big flowering. The rose has a light, musky fragrance, and has light green, glossy foliage. Leaves are susceptible to blackspot. 'John Cabot' has an arching growth habit, and in warmer climates can be trained as a climbing rose up to 10 feet.

"'John Cabot' has helped to set new standards for hardy roses. Its symmetrical, robust form, coupled with its long blooming season and excellent disease resistance, make it one of the most important new roses for northern gardens."

— Osbourne, 1991

== History ==
=== Felicitas Svejda ===
Felicitas Svejda was born November 8, 1920, in Vienna, Austria. She studied agricultural science at the University of Natural Resources and Life Sciences in Vienna, where she earned a PhD in 1948. She moved to Canada in 1953, and was hired by the Canadian Department of Agriculture's research division in Ottawa, Ontario. Her first project was researching cereal grains, but later began working with ornamental plants. Svejda was given a new project in 1961 to create a series of winter hardy roses, which would thrive in the coldest regions of Canada, with sub-freezing winter temperatures of -50 C, and would also flower regularly during Canada's short growing season.

With no prior knowledge of roses, Svejvda developed a successful rose-breeding program at the Central Experimental Farm (CEF) in Ottawa. From the 1960s to the 1980s, she introduced many new cultivars, including 22 roses in the Explorer Rose Series, named in honour of Canadian explorers. Some of her most popular cultivars are: 'Alexander Mackenzie', 'Jens Munk', 'David Thompson', and 'Henry Kelsey'. Svejvda led the rose-breeding program at CEF for 25 years, until her retirement in 1985. Her roses continued to be introduced in Canada well into the 1990s. Svejda died Jan. 19, 2016 in Ottawa at the age 95.

=== 'Captain John Cabot' ===
Svejda bred 'John Cabot' in 1969, using stock parents, 'Kordesii' × ('Masquerade' × Rosa laxa). The cultivar is the first of the Explorer Roses series that Svejda developed to withstand the harsh Canadian winters and thrive in its short growing season. The rose variety was named in honour of John Cabot (1450–1500), an Italian navigator who first explored the Northwest Passage.

== Sources ==
- Quest-Ritson, Brigid; Quest-Ritson, Charles (2003). Encyclopedia of Roses. DK Publishing. ISBN 978-0756688684.
- Osbourne, Robert (1991). Hardy Roses: an organic guide to growing frost- and disease-resistant varieties. Harper Collins. p. 72. ISBN 978-0882667393.
