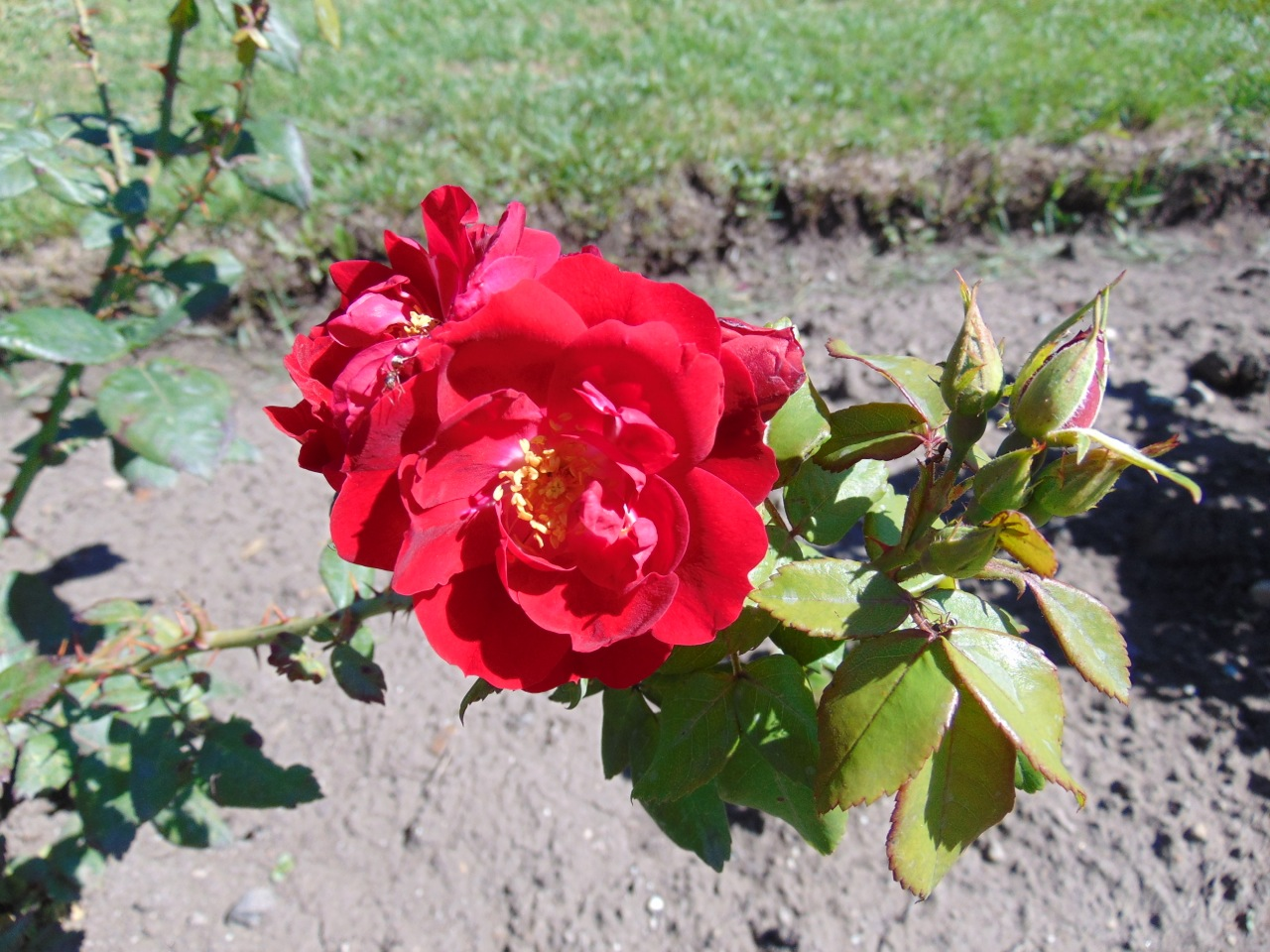
- Rosa × kordesii 'L 15', one of several garden roses produced with the same parentage

Scientific classification
- Kingdom: Plantae
- Clade: Tracheophytes
- Clade: Angiosperms
- Clade: Eudicots
- Clade: Rosids
- Order: Rosales
- Family: Rosaceae
- Genus: Rosa
- Species: R. × kordesii

Binomial name
- Rosa × kordesii H.Wulff

= Rosa × kordesii =

Species of flowering plant

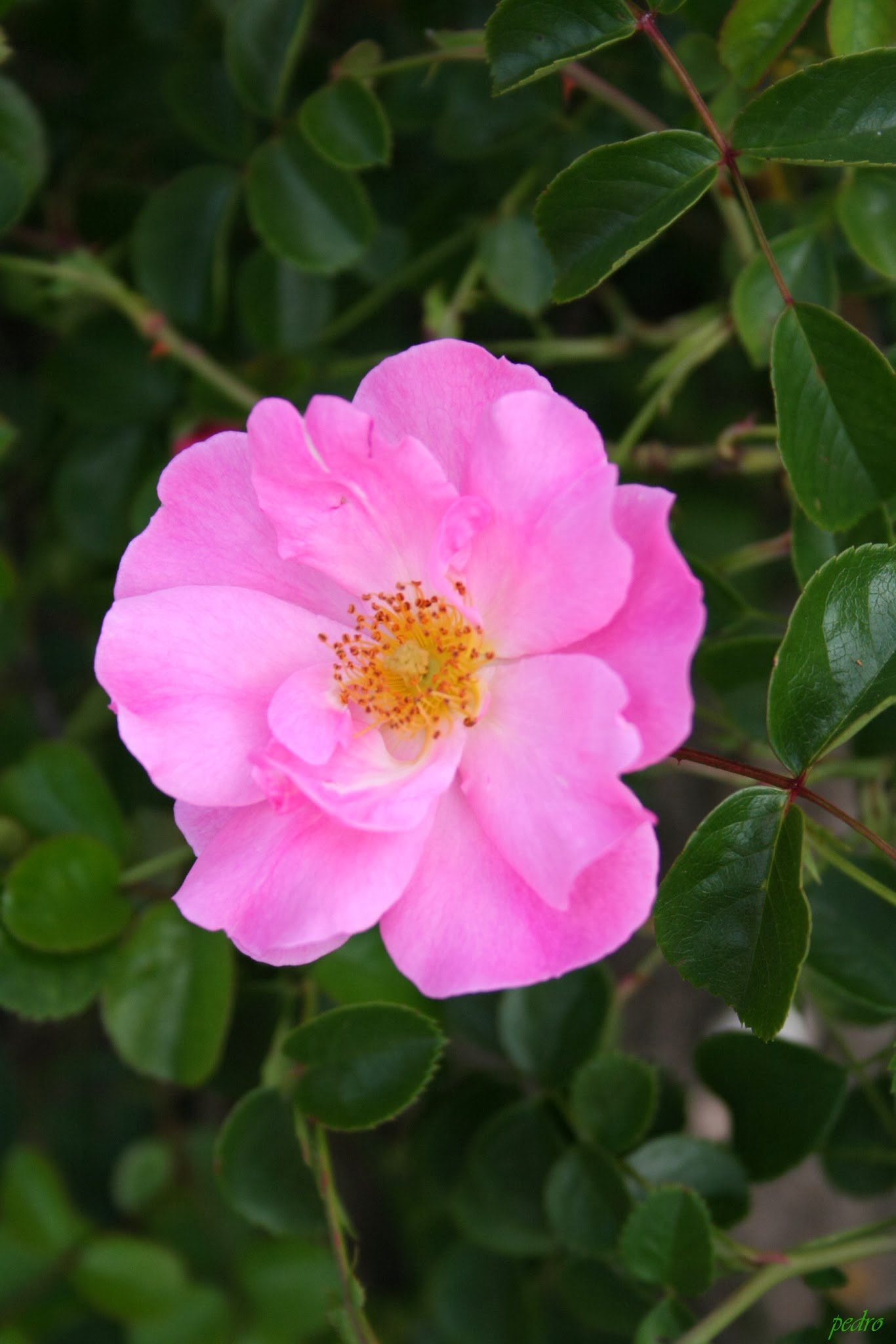
The rose 'Max Graf' is a hybrid between two species, R. rugosa and R. lucieae, and is nearly sterile. Amphidiploid offspring from it, and from other roses with the same parentage, have been given the species name Rosa × kordesii.

Rosa × kordesii, or Rosa kordesii, is a red type of rose that arose naturally from hybridization followed by chromosome doubling. A hybrid between R. rugosa and R. lucieae was created called Rosa 'Max Graf', but it was diploid and nearly sterile, producing flowers but no fruit. This rose produced a few viable seeds as a result of self-pollination, and the seedlings that resulted were tetraploid instead of diploid, i.e., the chromosomes of both pollen and egg cells had been naturally duplicated. The tetraploid seedlings are amphidiploids. A selection with double deep pink flowers and repeat bloom, also called 'K01 AgCan' was released by W. Kordes' Söhne in 1951.

These tetraploid roses interbreed readily with one another, but not with their diploid ancestors. Under the biological species concept, a new species name Rosa × kordesii was created for the tetraploid hybrid roses and their descendants.

Amphidiploid roses can also be created deliberately from diploid-diploid hybrids by using colchicine spray on the growing tips of the plants. That strategy gives few successes, however, because the plant tissue has various chromosome numbers in different cells. Amphidiploid roses including Rosa × kordesii have been used to some degree in breeding programs in combination with naturally occurring tetraploid roses.

== Uses ==
Rosa × kordesii petal extract gel is stable for at least 3–4 months when stored at 5 and 25 °C. It is essential for collection of similar data for different plants and their flowers, as well as other parts. This proved activity of plant showed its importance and prophylactic utility in anti-solar formulation. This will be a better, cheaper and safe alternative to harmful chemical sunscreens that used nowadays in the industry.
