= Rosa 'Alexander MacKenzie' =

Yellow blend shrub rose cultivar

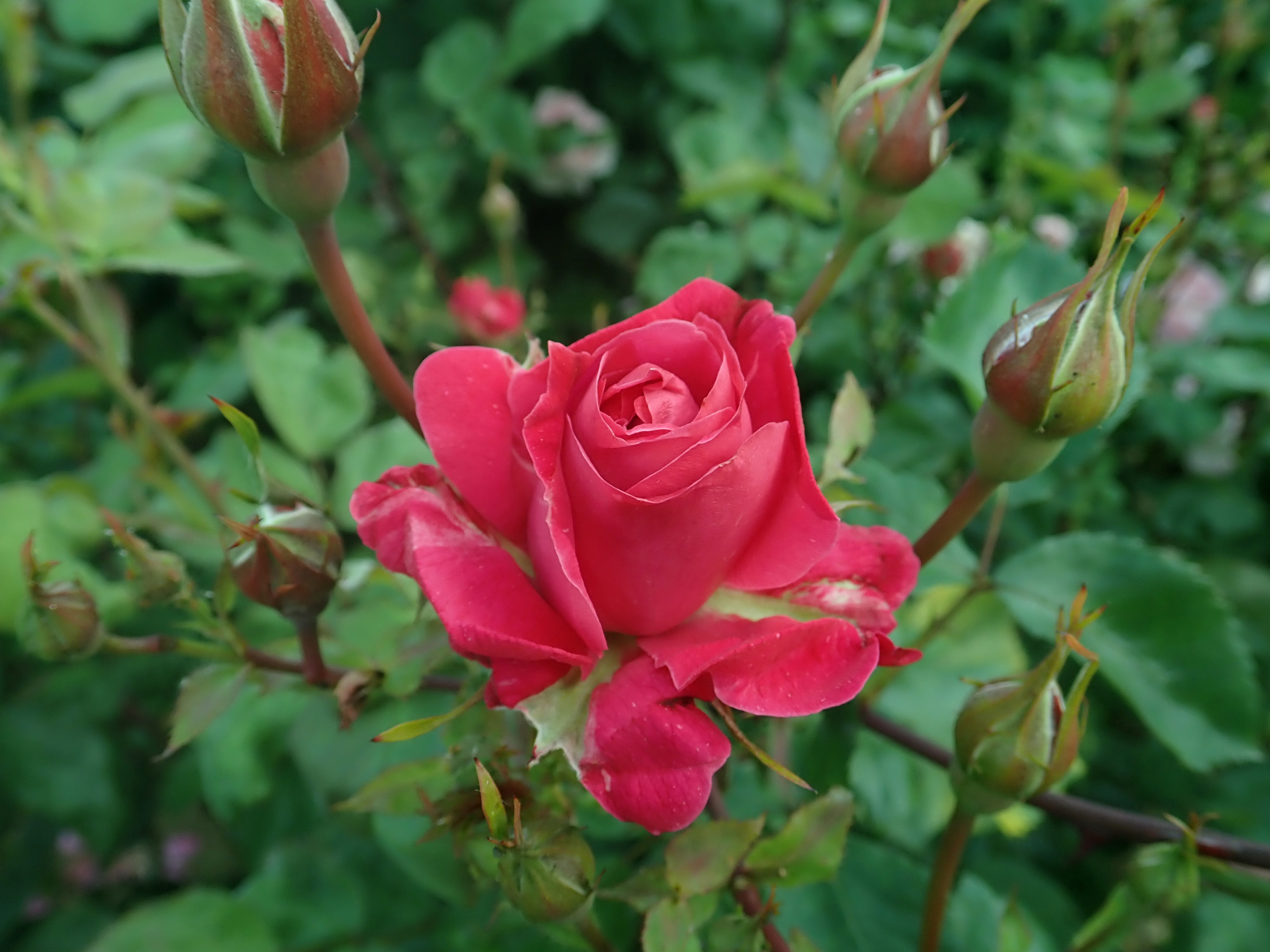
- Rosa 'Alexander Mackenzie'
- Genus: Rosa hybrid
- Hybrid parentage: 'Queen Elizabeth' × ('Red Dawn' × 'Suzanne')
- Cultivar group: Climbing shrub rose
- Marketing names: 'A. Mackenzie', 'Alexander Mackenzie', 'Alex Mackenzie'
- Breeder: Felicitas Svejda
- Origin: Ottawa, Canada, 1985

Rosa 'Alexander Mackenzie' (aka A. MacKenzie) is a red, short climbing shrub rose, bred by Canadian rose breeder, Felicitas Svejda. It was introduced in Canada in 1985 by Agriculture and Agri-Food Canada. It is one of the Canadian Explorer roses that Svejda developed and named in honour of legendary Canadian explorers.

== Description ==
'Alexander MacKenzie' is a short climbing, shrub rose, 5 to 8 ft (1.5–2.4 m) in height, with a 7 ft (2.1 m) spread. It has a cupped, fully double bloom form, carried in large clusters of 5 to 5 medium-sized 3 in (76 mm) petals. Pointed, ovoid buds open to flowers that are a bright crimson colour with yellow undertones. The rose has a mild fragrance, and has glossy, medium dark green foliage. 'Alexander MacKenzie' has an arching growth habit and can either be grown as a short climber or a shrub. It is an excellent rose for hot climates.

== History ==
=== Felicitas Svejda ===
Felicitas Svejda was born November 8, 1920, in Vienna, Austria. She studied agricultural science at the University of Natural Resources and Life Sciences in Vienna, where she earned a PhD in 1948. She moved to Canada in 1953, and was hired by the Canadian Department of Agriculture's research division in Ottawa, Ontario. Her first project was researching cereal grains, but later began working with ornamental plants. Svejda was given a new project in 1961 to create a series of winter hardy roses, which would thrive in the coldest regions of Canada, with sub-freezing winter temperatures of -50 C, and would also flower regularly during Canada's short growing season.

With no prior knowledge of roses, Svejvda developed a successful rose-breeding program at the Central Experimental Farm (CEF) in Ottawa. From the 1960s to the 1980s, she introduced many new cultivars, including 22 roses in the Explorer Rose Series, named in honour of Canadian explorers. Some of her most popular cultivars are: 'John Cabot', 'Jens Munk', 'David Thompson', and 'Henry Kelsey'. Svejvda led the rose-breeding program at CEF for 25 years, until her retirement in 1985. Her roses continued to be introduced in Canada well into the 1990s. Svejda died Jan. 19, 2016 in Ottawa at the age 95.

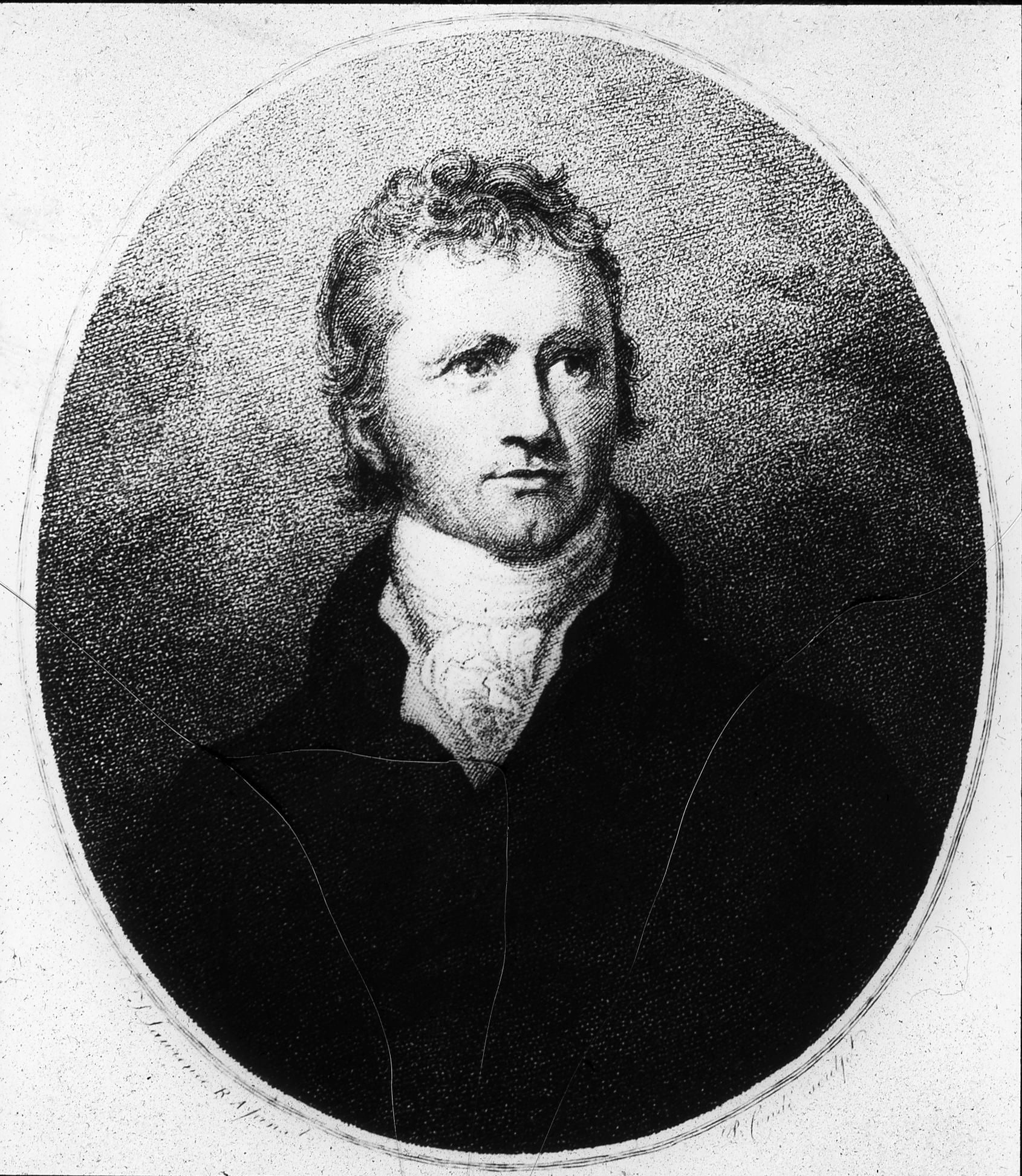
Alexander MacKenzie

=== 'Alexander MacKenzie' ===
Svejda bred 'Alexander MacKenzie' in 1985 using stock parents, 'Queen Elizabeth' × ('Red Dawn' × 'Suzanne'). The cultivar is one of the Explorer Roses that Svejda developed to withstand the harsh Canadian winters and thrive in its short growing season. The plant was named in honour of Alexander MacKenzie (1763—1820), the Scottish-born explorer who led the first expedition to cross the Continental Divide in Canada and reach the Pacific Coast in British Columbia.

== Sources ==
- Quest-Ritson, Brigid; Quest-Ritson, Charles (1993). Encyclopedia of Roses. DK Publishing. ISBN 978-0756688684.
- Schneider, Peter (1995). Peter Schneider on Roses. Macmillan Publishing. ISBN 978-0028600383.
