= Rosa 'Jens Munk' =

Medium pink Hybrid Rugosa rose cultivar

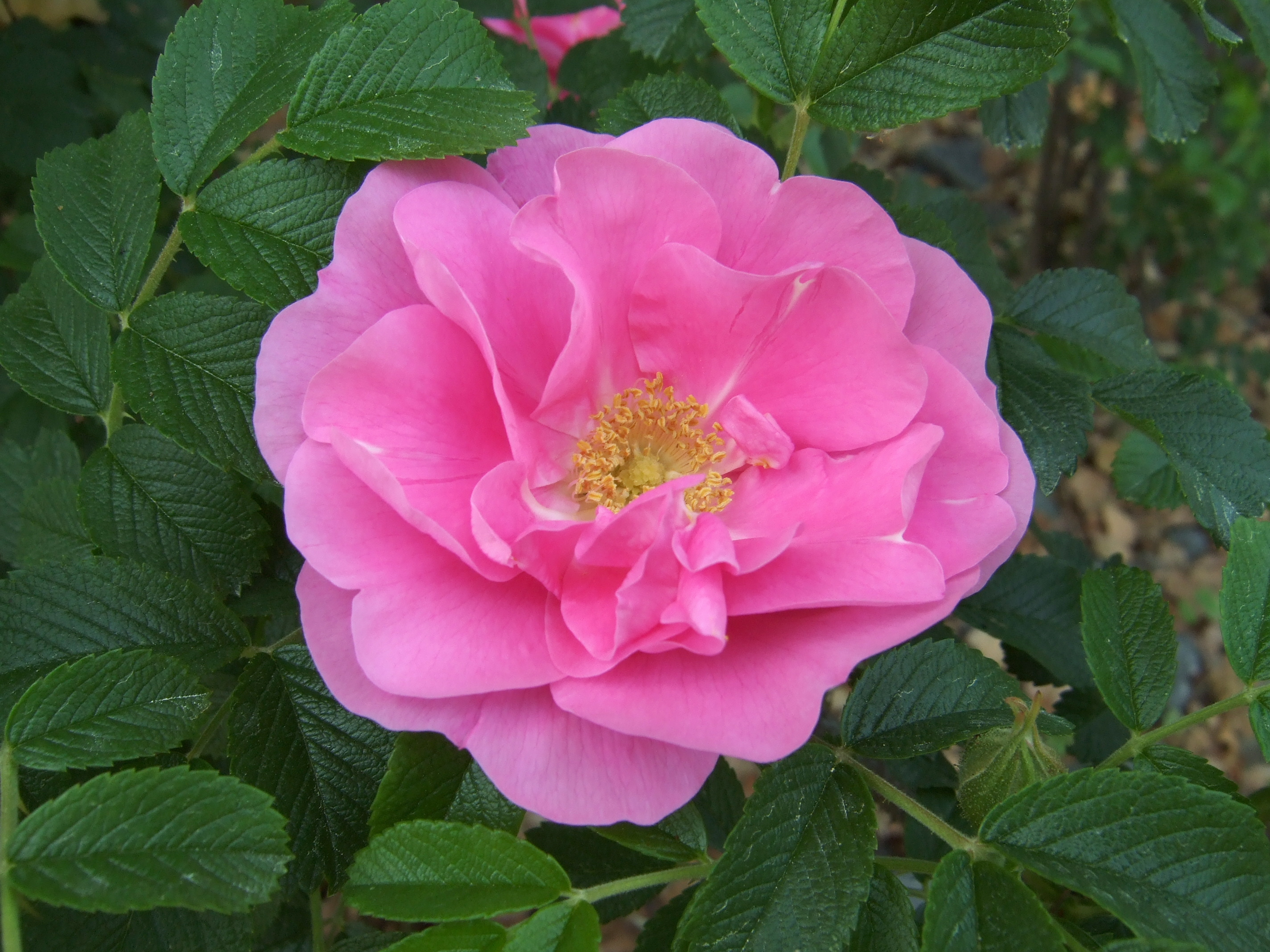
- Rosa 'Jens Munk'
- Genus: Rosa hybrid
- Hybrid parentage: 'Schneezwerg' x 'Fru Dagmar Hastrup'
- Cultivar group: Hybrid rugosa
- Breeder: Felicitas Svejda
- Origin: Ottawa, Canada, 1979

Rosa 'Jens Munk' is a medium pink, Hybrid Rugosa cultivar, bred by Canadian rose breeder, Felicitas Svejda in 1964. It was introduced in Canada in 1979 by Agriculture and Agri-Food Canada. Named for the Norwegian explorer, Jens Munk, who explored the Northwest Passage in 1619, it is one of the Canadian Explorer roses that Svejda developed and named in honour of legendary Canadian explorers.

== Description ==
'Jens Munk' is a tall, bushy Hybrid rugosa rose, 4 to 7 ft (1.2–2.1 m) in height, with a 5 to 6 ft (1.5–1.8 m) spread. It has a semi-double, slightly cupped bloom form of medium-sized 2.8 in (71 mm) pink petals with pale yellow stamens. The rose has a strong, spicy fragrance. The shrub blooms in small clusters of 3–5 throughout the season and blooms profusely in the autumn. It is disease resistant and sometimes susceptible to mildew. 'Jens Munk' has an arching, rambling growth habit and has small to medium green foliage. 'Jens Munk' is very hardy in extremely cold winter climates, but does equally well in hot climates.

== History ==
=== Felicitas Svejda ===
Felicitas Svejda was born November 8, 1920, in Vienna, Austria. She studied agricultural science at the University of Natural Resources and Life Sciences in Vienna, where she earned a PhD in 1948. She moved to Canada in 1953, and was hired by the Canadian Department of Agriculture's research division in Ottawa, Ontario. Her first project was researching cereal grains, but later began working with ornamental plants. Svejda was given a new project in 1961 to create a series of winter hardy roses, which would thrive in the coldest regions of Canada, with sub-freezing winter temperatures of -50 C, and would also flower regularly during Canada's short growing season.

With no prior knowledge of roses, Svejvda developed a successful rose-breeding program at the Central Experimental Farm (CEF) in Ottawa. From the 1960s to the 1980s, she introduced many new cultivars, including 22 roses in the Explorer Rose Series, named in honour of Canadian explorers. Some of her most popular cultivars are: 'John Cabot', 'Alexander MacKenzie', 'David Thompson', and 'Henry Kelsey'. Svejvda led the rose-breeding program at CEF for 25 years, until her retirement in 1985. Her roses continued to be introduced in Canada well into the 1990s. Svejda died Jan. 19, 2016 in Ottawa at the age 95.

=== 'Jens Munk' ===
Svejda bred 'Jens Munk' in 1964 using two Hybrid rugosas, 'Schneezwerg' x 'Fru Dagmar Hastrup'. 'Jens Munk' was introduced in Canada in 1979 by Agriculture and Agri-Food Canada. The cultivar is one of the Explorer Roses that Svejda developed to withstand the harsh Canadian winters and thrive in its short growing season. It is named for the Norwegian explorer, Jens Munk, who explored the Northwest Passage in 1619.

== Sources ==
- Quest-Ritson, Brigid; Quest-Ritson, Charles (2003). Encyclopedia of Roses. DK Publishing. ISBN 978-0756688684.
- Schneider, Peter (1995). Peter Schneider on Roses. Macmillan Publishing. ISBN 978-0028600383.
