= Rosa 'David Thompson' =

Deep reddish-pink Hybrid Kordesii rose cultivar

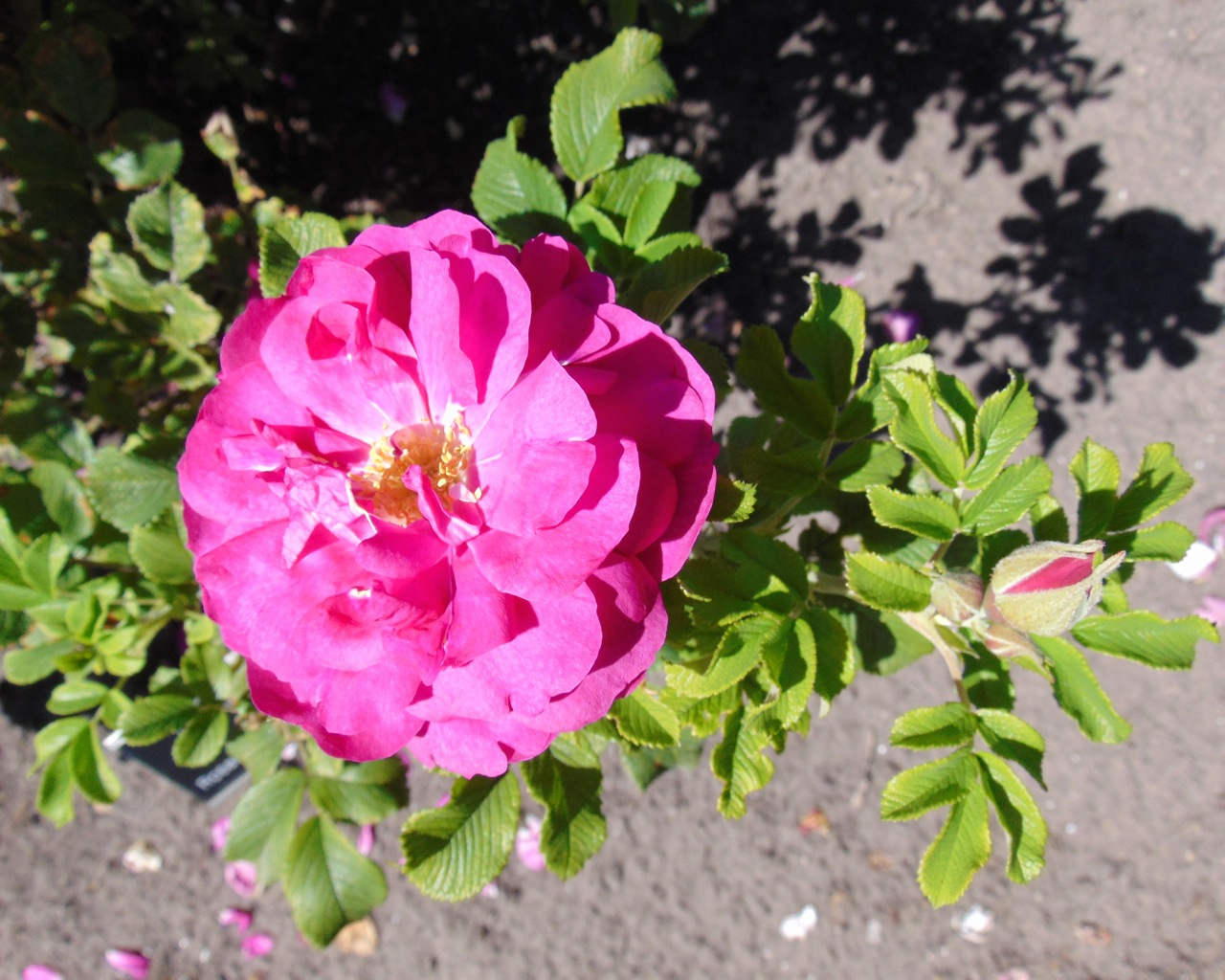
- Rosa 'David Thompson'
- Genus: Rosa hybrid
- Hybrid parentage: 'Schneezwerg' x 'Fru Dagmar Hastrup'
- Cultivar group: Hybrid rugosa
- Breeder: Felicitas Svejda
- Origin: Ottawa, Canada, 1970

Rosa 'David Thompson' is a deep pink, Hybrid rugosa cultivar, bred by Canadian rose breeder, Felicitas Svejda in 1970. It was introduced in Canada in 1979 by Agriculture and Agri-Food Canada. It is one of the Canadian Explorer roses that Svejda developed and named in honour of legendary Canadian explorers.

== Description ==
'David Thompson' is a medium, bushy Hybrid rugosa rose, 3 to 4 ft (0.91–1.22 m) in height, with a 4 to 5 ft (1.2–1.5 m) spread. It has a double, cupped bloom form of medium-sized 2.8 in (71 mm) flowers. Blooms vary in color from purplish-pink to deep red. Flowers often display streaks of white and the stamens are pale yellow. They are borne in short-stemmed clusters of 3 to 7. The rose has a strong, sweet scent. The rose blooms in flushes throughout the season. It is a very hardy plant and is disease resistant. The leaves are small and medium green in colour, and have a tendency to turn brown at the edges.

== History ==
=== Felicitas Svejda ===
Felicitas Svejda was born November 8, 1920, in Vienna, Austria. She studied agricultural science at the University of Natural Resources and Life Sciences in Vienna, where she earned a PhD in 1948. She moved to Canada in 1953, and was hired by the Canadian Department of Agriculture's research division in Ottawa, Ontario. Her first project was researching cereal grains, but later she began working with ornamental plants. Svejda was given a new project in 1961 to create a series of winter-hardy roses, which would thrive in the coldest regions of Canada, with sub-freezing winter temperatures of -50 C, and would also flower regularly during Canada's short growing season.

With no prior knowledge of roses, Svejvda developed a successful rose-breeding program at the Central Experimental Farm (CEF) in Ottawa. From the 1960s to the 1980s, she introduced many new cultivars, including 22 roses in the Explorer Rose Series, named in honour of Canadian explorers. Some of her most popular cultivars are: 'John Cabot', 'Alexander MacKenzie', 'Henry Kelsey', and 'Jens Munk'. Svejvda led the rose-breeding program at CEF for 25 years, until her retirement in 1985. Her roses continued to be introduced in Canada well into the 1990s. Svejda died Jan. 19, 2016, in Ottawa at the age of 95.

=== 'David Thompson' ===
Svejda bred 'David Thompson' in 1970 using two Hybrid rugosas, 'Schneezwerg' x 'Fru Dagmar Hastrup'. The rose cultivar was introduced in Canada in 1979 by Agriculture and Agri-Food Canada. It is one of the Explorer Roses that Svejda developed to withstand the harsh Canadian winters and thrive in its short growing season. The rose was named for David Thompson (1770–1857), a British-Canadian fur trader, surveyor, and cartographer.

== Sources ==
- Quest-Ritson, Brigid; Quest-Ritson, Charles (2003). Encyclopedia of Roses. DK Publishing. ISBN 978-0756688684.
- Schneider, Peter (1995). Peter Schneider on Roses. Macmillan Publishing. ISBN 978-0028600383.
