= Rosa 'Scentimental' =

Rose cultivar

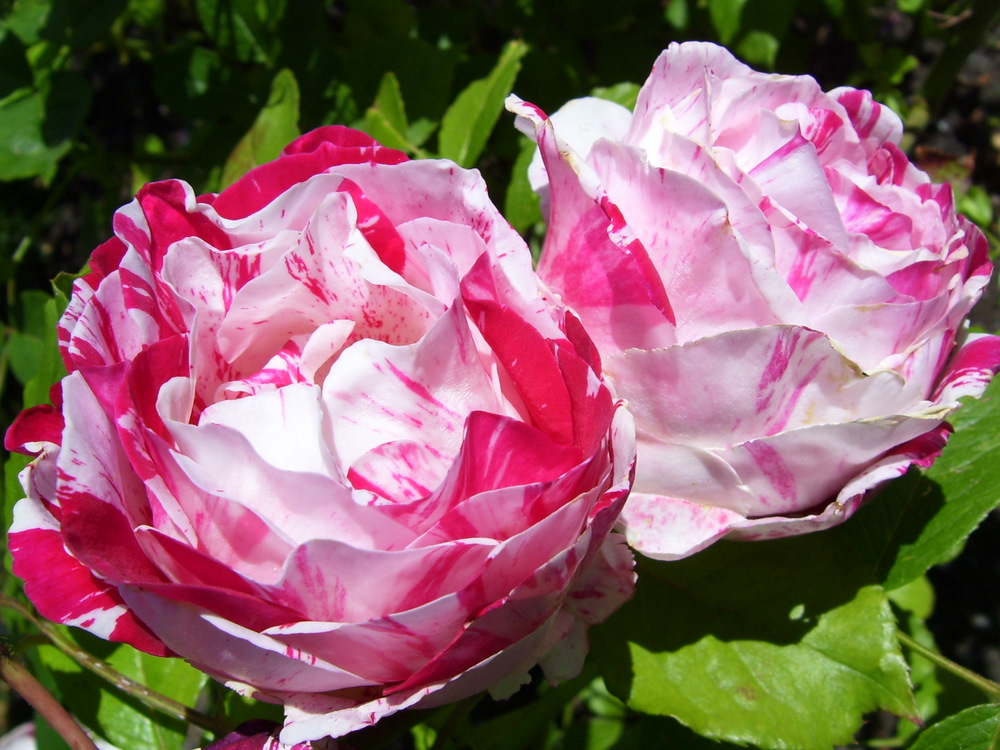
- Rosa 'Scentimental'
- Genus: Rosa 'hybrid'
- Hybrid parentage: 'Playboy' x 'Peppermint Twist'
- Cultivar group: Floribunda
- Cultivar: WEKplapep
- Marketing names: Scentimental
- Origin: Tom Carruth, (US, 1996)

Rosa 'Scentimental' is a red and white striped Floribunda rose, created by Tom Carruth in 1996. The rose was named an All-America Rose Selections winner in 1997.

== Description ==
'Scentimental' is a compact bushy shrub, 3 to 5 ft (91-152 cm) in height, with a 3 to 4 ft (91-121 cm) spread. Blooms have an average diameter of 4 to 5 inches (10-12 cm) and can have more than 40 petals. 'Scentimental' blooms continuously from spring to fall, with small clusters of very fragrant, red and white striped petals. It has large, semi-glossy, medium green foliage. It is a repeat bloomer, and produces its best flowers and richest colors in cooler temperatures. The plant is known to be heat tolerant.

== History ==
Rose breeder, Tom Carruth, created more than 100 rose varieties during his career, including eleven All America Rose Selections (AARS). Carruth began his career in 1975, working with hybridizer, William Warriner at Jackson & Perkins rose nursery. He worked at the company for three years before moving to Armstrong Nursery in southern California, where he worked for seven years with hybridizer, Jack Christensen. In 1986, Carruth moved to Weeks Wholesale Rose Grower. In 1989, Carruth was promoted to rose hybridizer at the nursery. He worked at Weeks nursery for twenty years, until his retirement in 2012.

Carruth had a strong interest in developing striped and unusually colored roses in his breeding program. Rose breeder, Nan Cocker, of Aberdeen, Scotland, was an influence in this area; Cocker had developed several new rose varieties with unusual colors and patterns. One of his earliest successes in striped roses was the red and white Floribunda, 'Scentimental'. He later created the striped Floribundas, 'George Burns' (1996), and 'Betty Boop' (1999). 'Scentimental' was bred by Carruth before 1996, using the stock parents, Floribunda Rosa 'Playboy' and Grandiflora Rosa 'Peppermint Twist'. The new rose variety was introduced into the United States by Weeks Wholesale Rose Grower, Inc. in 1997. 'Scentimental' was used to develop four new rose cultivars, Rosa 'All American Magic', Rosa 'Chihuly', Rosa 'City of Carlsbad', and Rosa 'Julio Iglesias'.

== See also ==
- Garden roses
- Rose Hall of Fame
- List of Award of Garden Merit roses
