= Tom Carruth =

American award-winning rose hybridizer

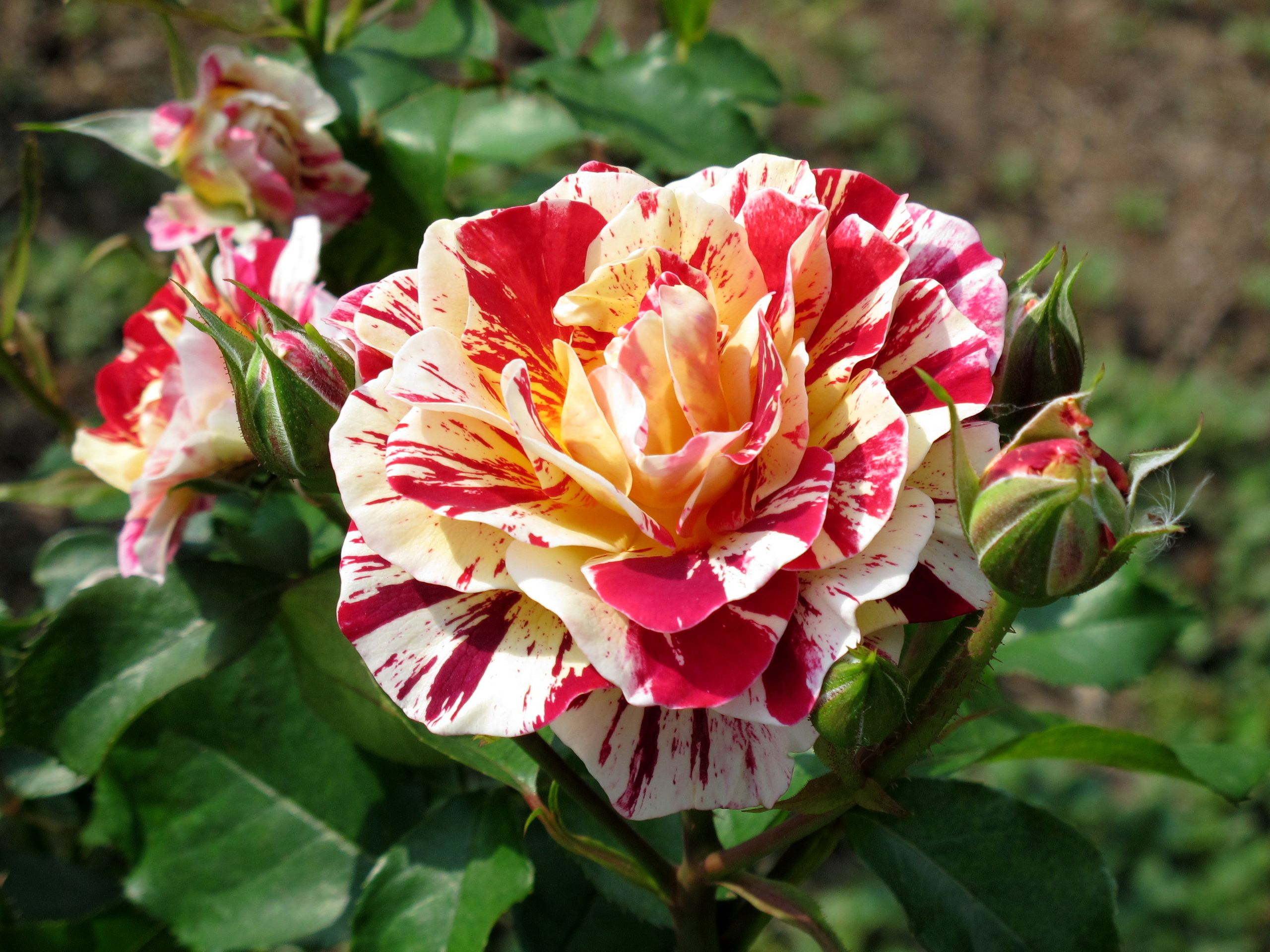
'George Burns', Tom Carruth, 1996

Tom Carruth is an American rose hybridizer, who has created more than 100 rose varieties, including eleven All-America Rose Selections (AARS). He is currently the E.L. and Ruth B. Shannon Curator of the Rose Collections at the Huntington Library in San Marino, California.

== Early life and education ==
Carruth's first fifteen years were spent in Pampa, Texas. He knew at an early age that he wanted a career working with flowers. To earn spending money, Carruth sold seeds from the Burpee seed company to local residents. When he was sixteen, Carruth and his family moved to Irving, Texas, where he discovered a passion for plant biology. "When his teacher lectured on genetics and mentioned plant breeders, Carruth says, 'I knew I was on my way.'"

Carruth attended the University of North Texas in Denton, Texas. He transferred to Texas A&M University in his junior year where me met J.C. Raulston, a professor in horticulture, who would become Carruth's mentor. Raulston encouraged Carruth to study for an advanced degree. With Raulston's support, Carruth applied for a scholarship and earned a master's degree in plant breeding two years later in 1976.

== Career ==
In 1975, Carruth began his rose breeding career working with hybridizer, Bill Warriner, at Jackson & Perkins rose nursery. He worked at the company for three years before being hired by Armstrong nursery in southern California. During his seven years at Armstrong, he worked with hybridizer, Jack Christensen. In 1986, Carruth was offered a position with Weeks Wholesale Rose Grower, where he was a sales representative for two years. In 1989 he was promoted to full time garden roses breeder. He worked at Weeks for twenty six years as the chief hybridizer.

In 2012, Carruth announced his retirement. During his forty-year career, he is credited with introducing more than 100 roses, including eleven All-America Rose Selections (AARS). After his retirement, Carruth accepted the position as the E.L. and Ruth B. Shannon Curator of the Rose Collections at the Huntington Library in San Marino, California. The 3-acre rose garden, originally planted in 1908, has more than 4000 rose bushes.

== Selected roses ==
- 'Stainless Steel', Hybrid tea, (1991)
- 'Chris Evert', Hybrid tea, (Before 1996)
- 'George Burns', Floribunda, (1996)
- 'Scentimental', Floribunda, (1996), AARS
- 'Rockin Robin', Shrub, (1997)
- 'Blueberry Hill', Floribunda (1997)
- 'Fourth of July', climbing rose, (1999), AARS
- 'Betty Boop', Floribunda, (1999), AARS
- 'Mellow Yellow', Hybrid tea, (2000)
- 'Barbra Streisand', Hybrid tea, (2001)
- 'Ebb Tide', Floribunda, (2001)
- 'Home Run', Shrub, (2001)
- 'Memorial Day', Floribuna, (2001), AARS
- 'Hot Cocoa', Floribunda, (2002), AARS
- 'Marilyn Monroe', Hybrid tea, (2002)
- 'About Face', Floribunda, (2003), AARS
- 'Della Reese', Hybrid tea, (2003)
- 'Julia Child', Floribunda, (2004), AARS
- 'Wild Blue Yonder', Grandiflora, (2004), AARS
- 'Strike It Rich', Grandiflora, (2005), AARS
- 'Cinco de Mayo', Floribunda, (2006), AARS
- ''Rock and Roll', Grandiflora, (2006)
- 'Pink Home Run', Shrub, (2007)
- 'Neil Diamond', Hybrid tea, (Before 2011)
- 'Watercolors Home Run', Shrub, (2012)
- 'Twilight Zone', Grandiflora, (2012)

== Rose gallery ==
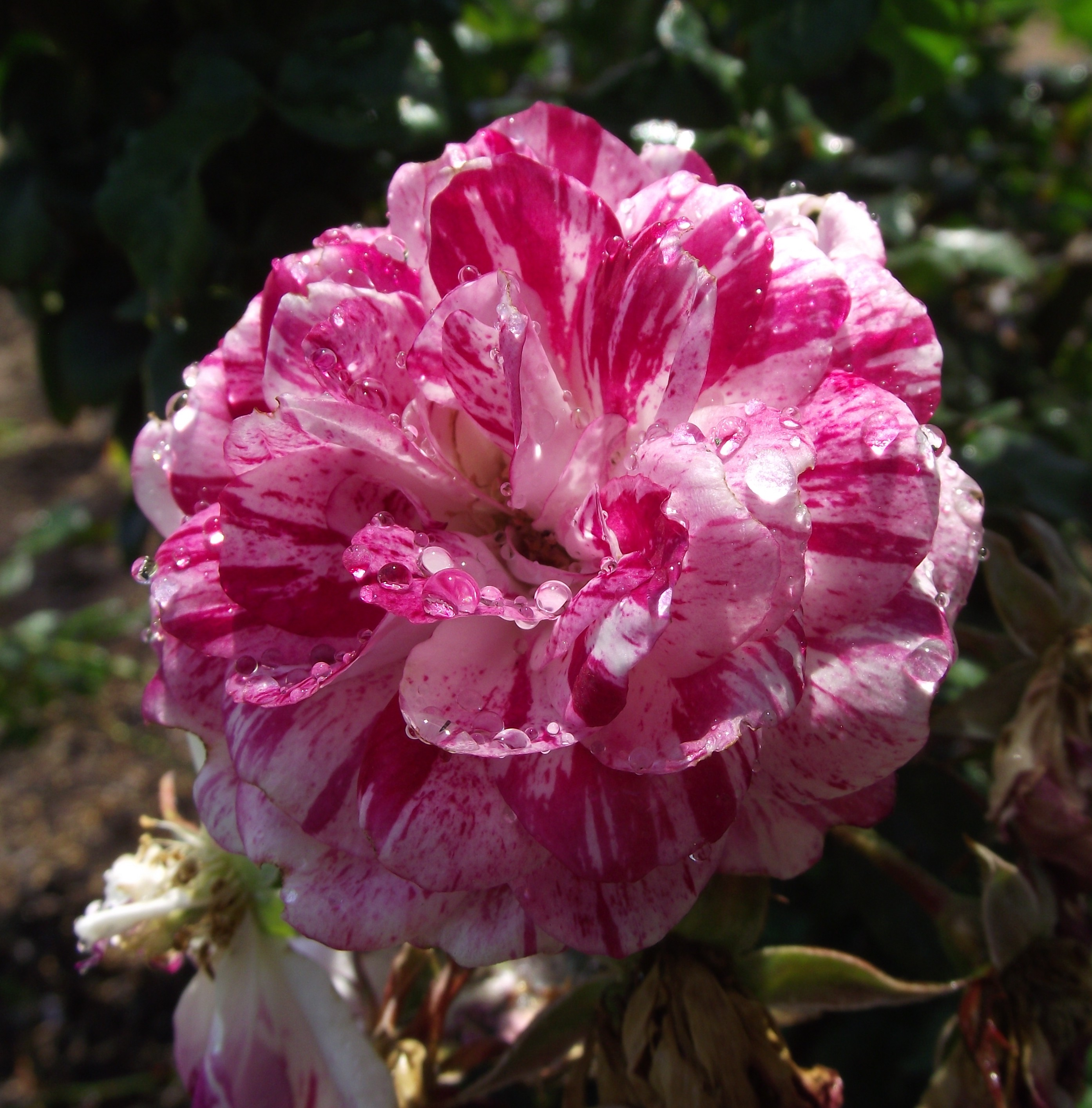
'Rockin Robbin', (1997)

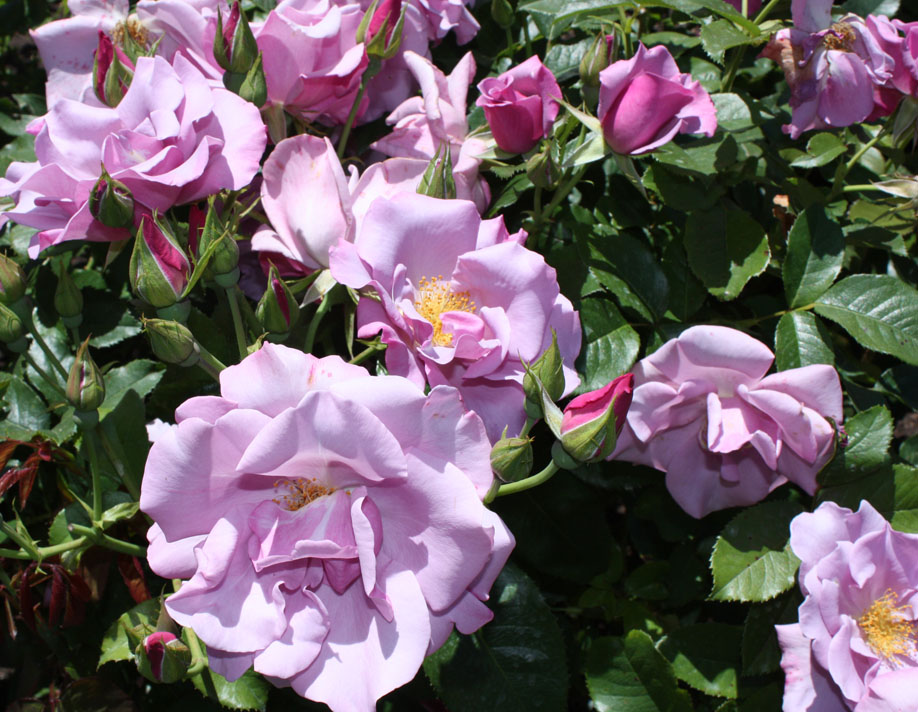
'Blueberry Hill', (1997)

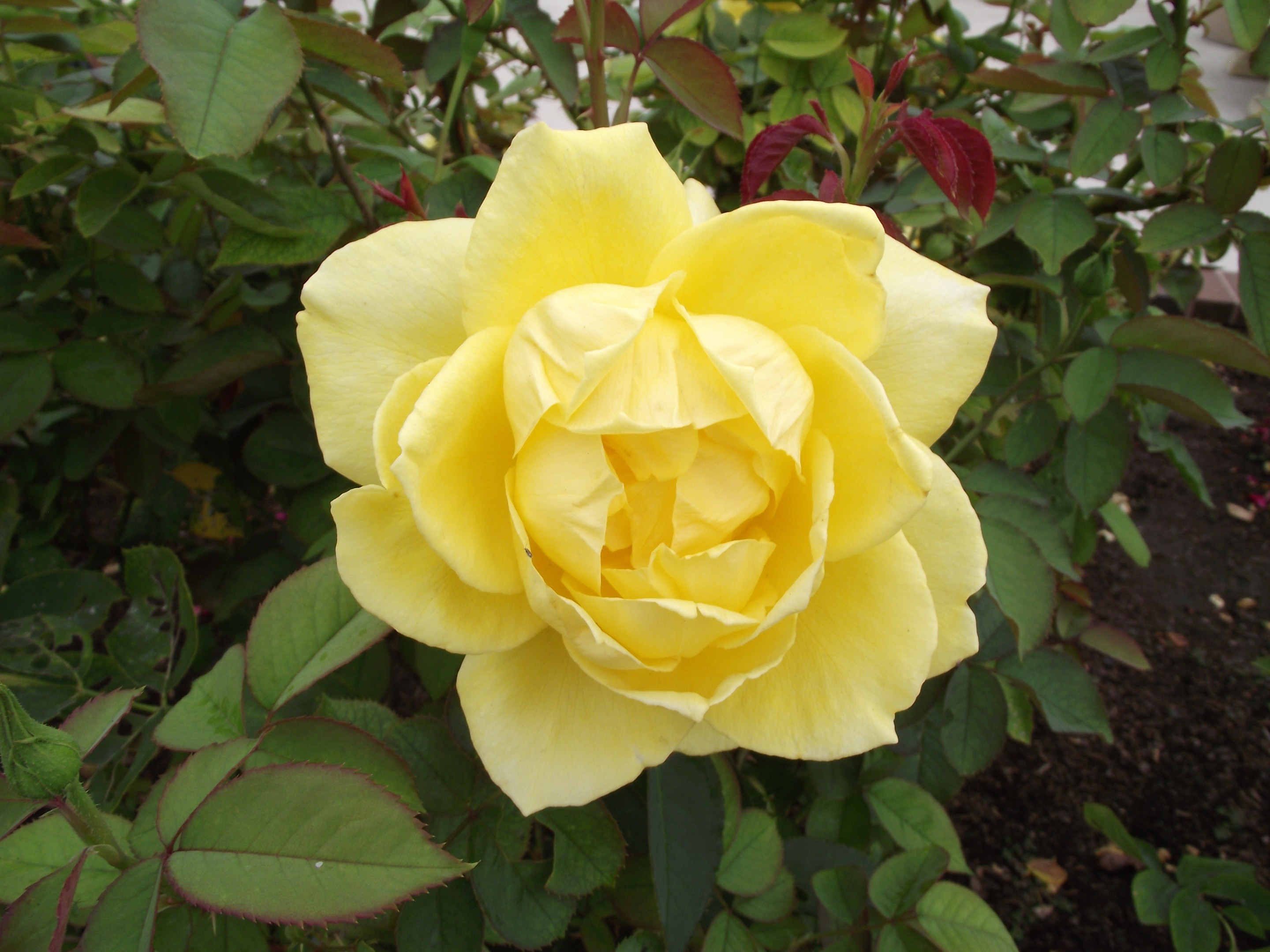
'Mellow Yellow', (2000)

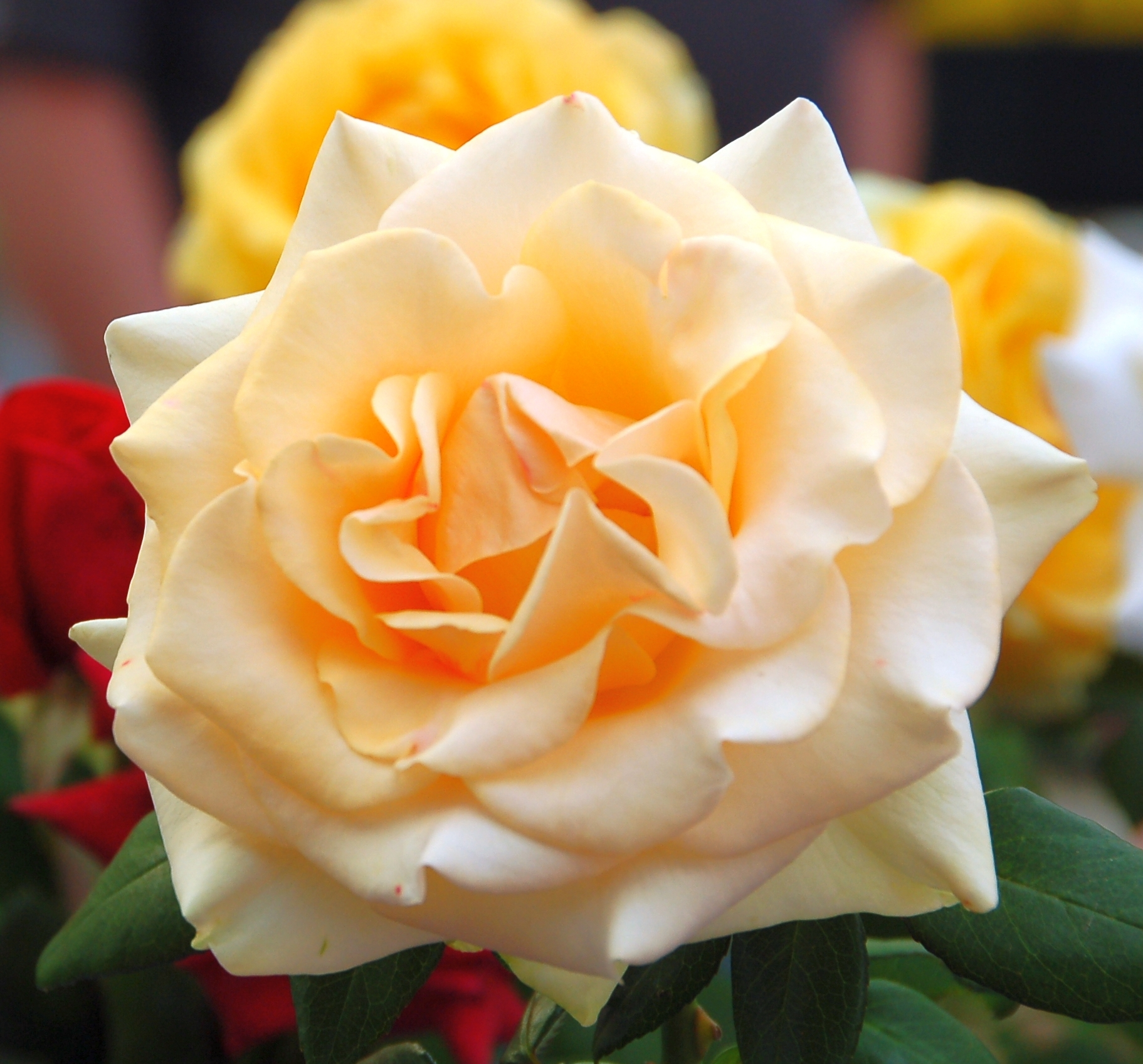
'Marilyn Monroe', (2002)

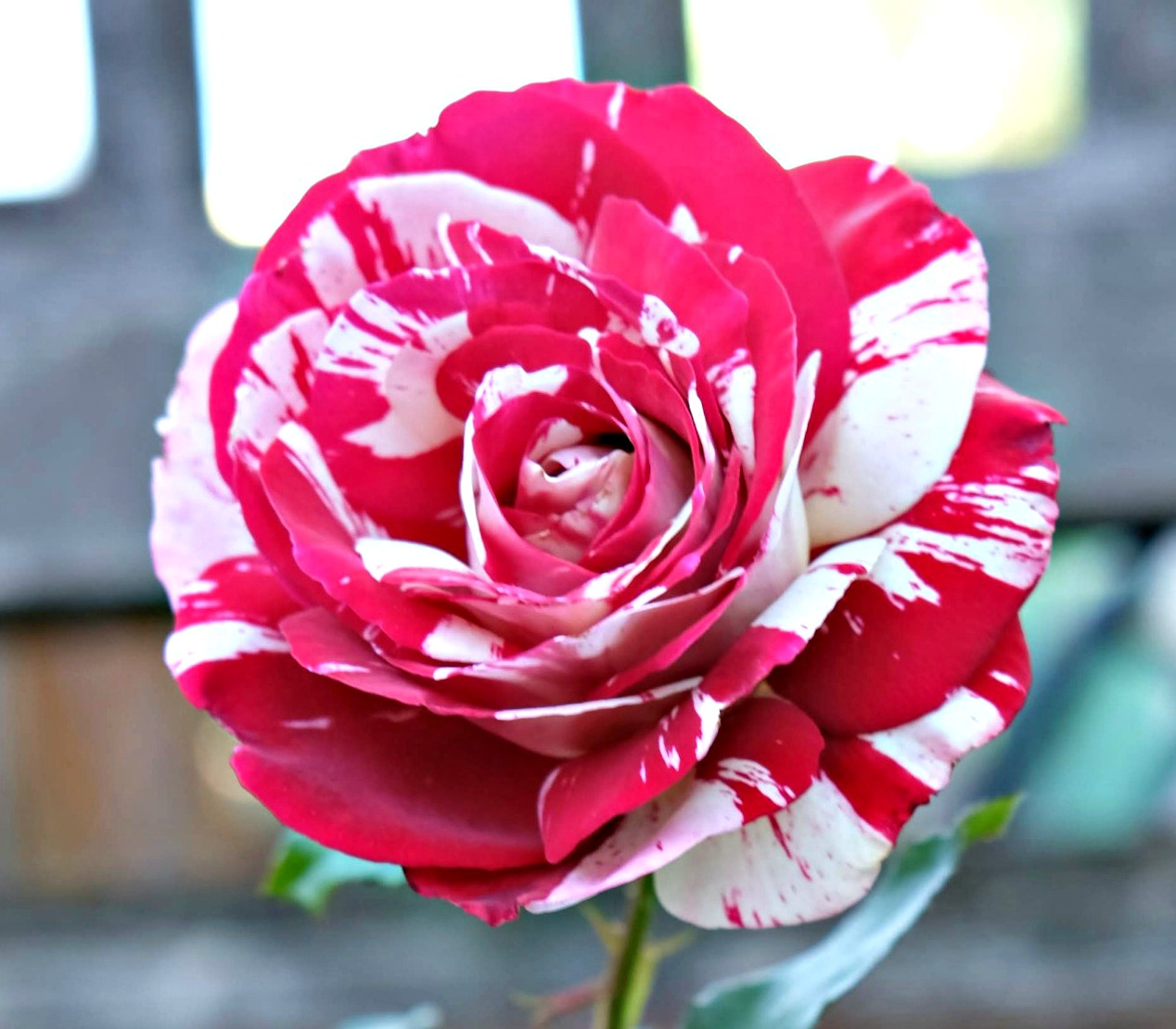
'Rock & Roll', (2006)

== See also ==
- Garden roses
- David C.H. Austin
- Sam McGredy
