= Rosa 'Rock & Roll' =

Rose cultivar

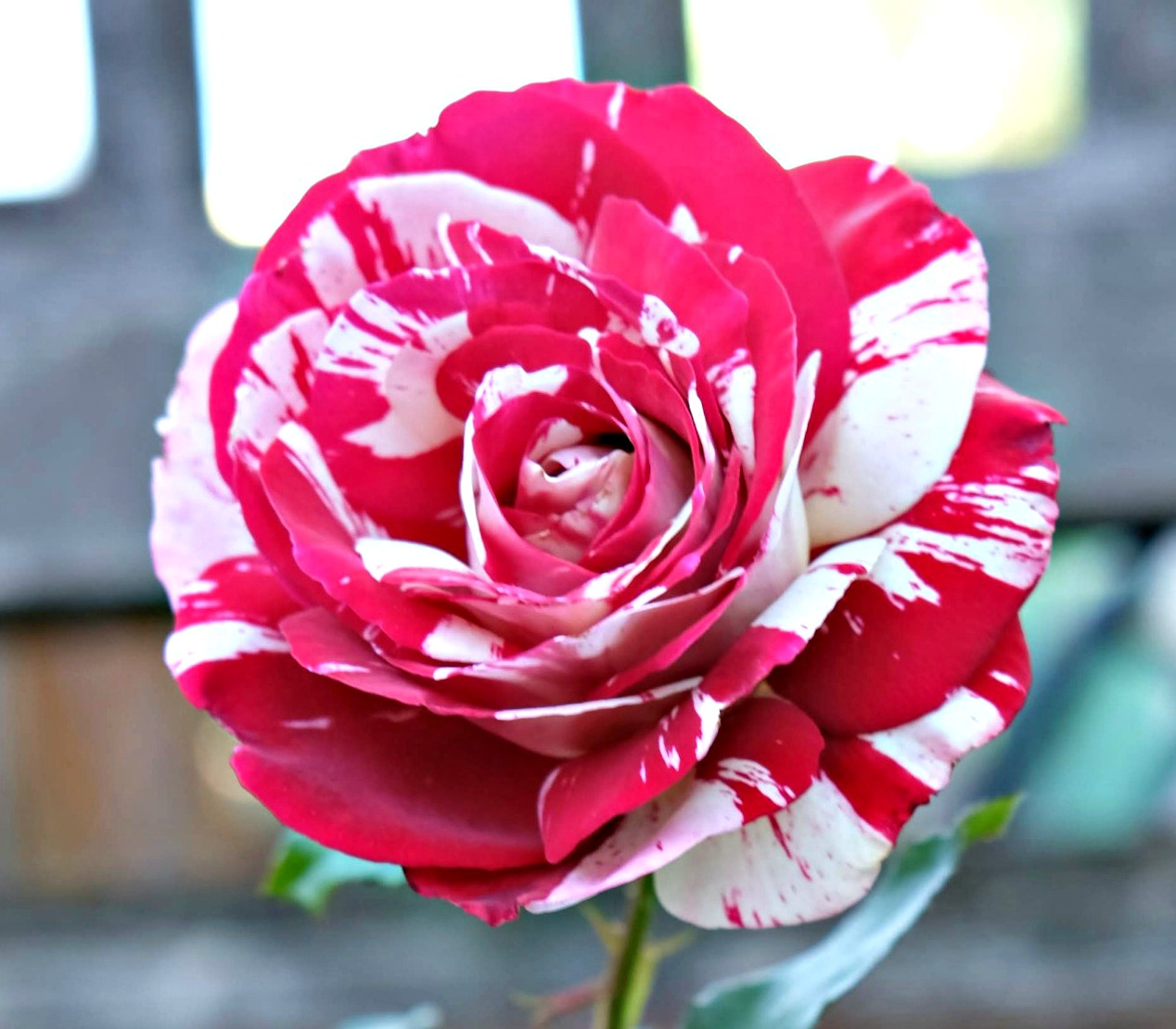
- Rosa 'Rock & Roll'
- Genus: Rosa hybrid
- Hybrid parentage: 'George Burns' (Floribunda) x 'New Zealand' (Hybrid tea)
- Cultivar group: Grandiflora
- Cultivar: WEKgobnez
- Origin: Tom Carruth (United States, 2006)

Rosa 'Rock & Roll' is a red and white Grandiflora rose cultivar, developed in the United States by Tom Carruth in 2006. It was introduced into the United States by Weeks Wholesale Rose Grower, Inc. in 2007.

== History ==
=== Tom Carruth ===
Carruth began his career at Jackson & Perkins rose nursery in 1975. He worked at the company for three years before being hired by Armstrong nursery in southern California. He worked at Armstrong for seven years, working with rose hybridizer, Jack Christensen. In 1986, Carruth began working at Weeks Wholesale Rose Grower. He worked at Weeks for twenty six years, and was the nursery's rose hybridizer from 1989 until his retirement in 2012. During his forty-year career, Carruth introduced more than 100 rose varieties, including eleven All-America Rose Selections (AARS).

=== 'Rock & Roll' ===
'Rock & Roll' was created by American rose breeder, Tom Carruth, in 2006 and introduced into the United States by Weeks Wholesale Rose Grower, Inc. in 2007. The stock parents of this rose are the multi-colored Floribunda cultivar, 'George Burns' (Carruth 1998) and the hybrid tea rose, 'New Zealand' (McGredy 1989).

== Description ==
'Rock & Roll' is a medium shrub of upright bushy growth, 4 to 5 ft (121–152 cm) in height. In summer, it bears clusters of very fragrant, burgundy, red and white striped petals on long stems. Blooms have an average diameter of 5 in (10–15 cm) and have 35 to 40 petals. Flower size is medium to large and best in the spring and fall. 'Rock & Roll' is disease resistant with dark, glossy green foliage.

== Gallery ==
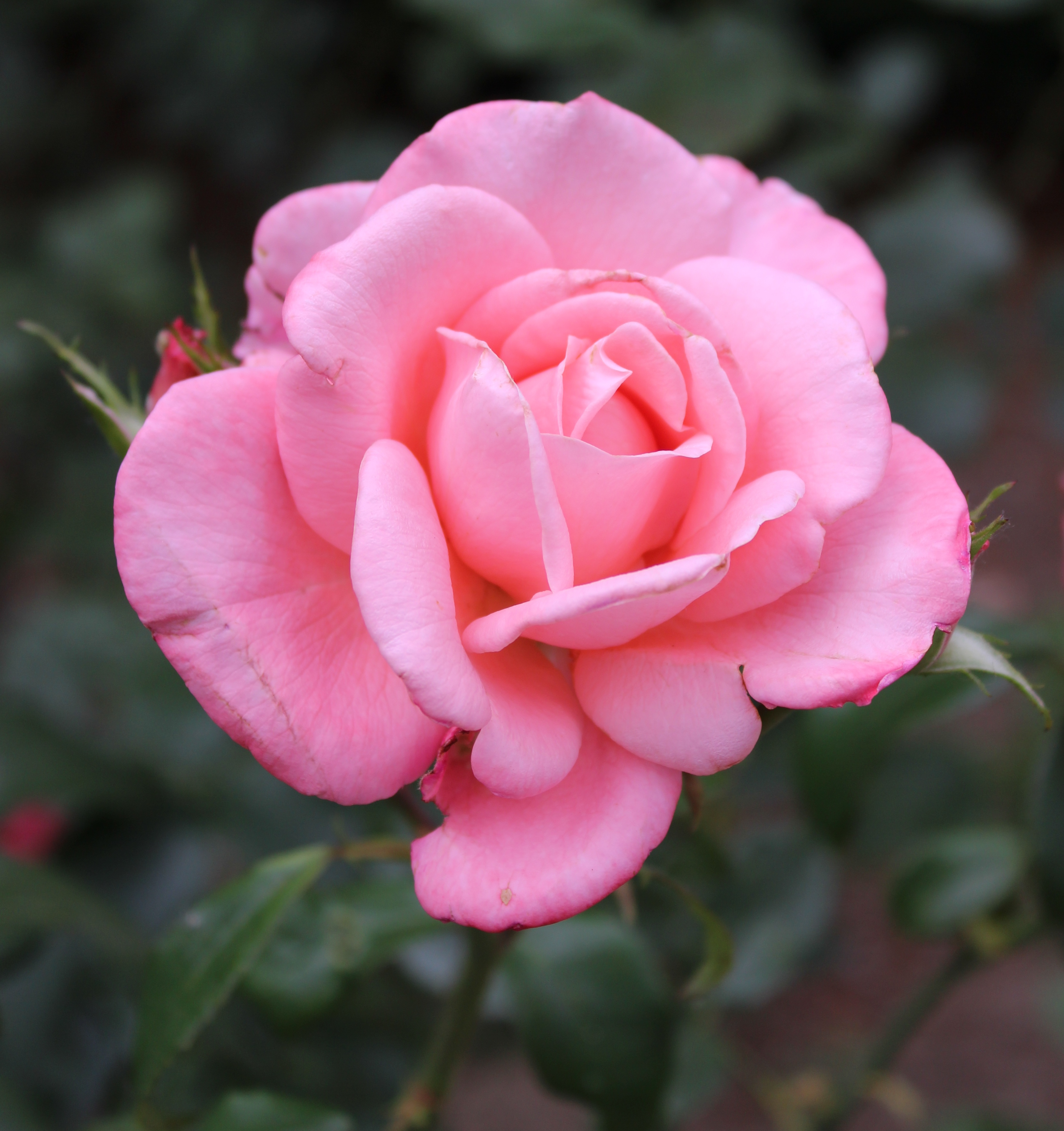
Parent, 'New Zealand'

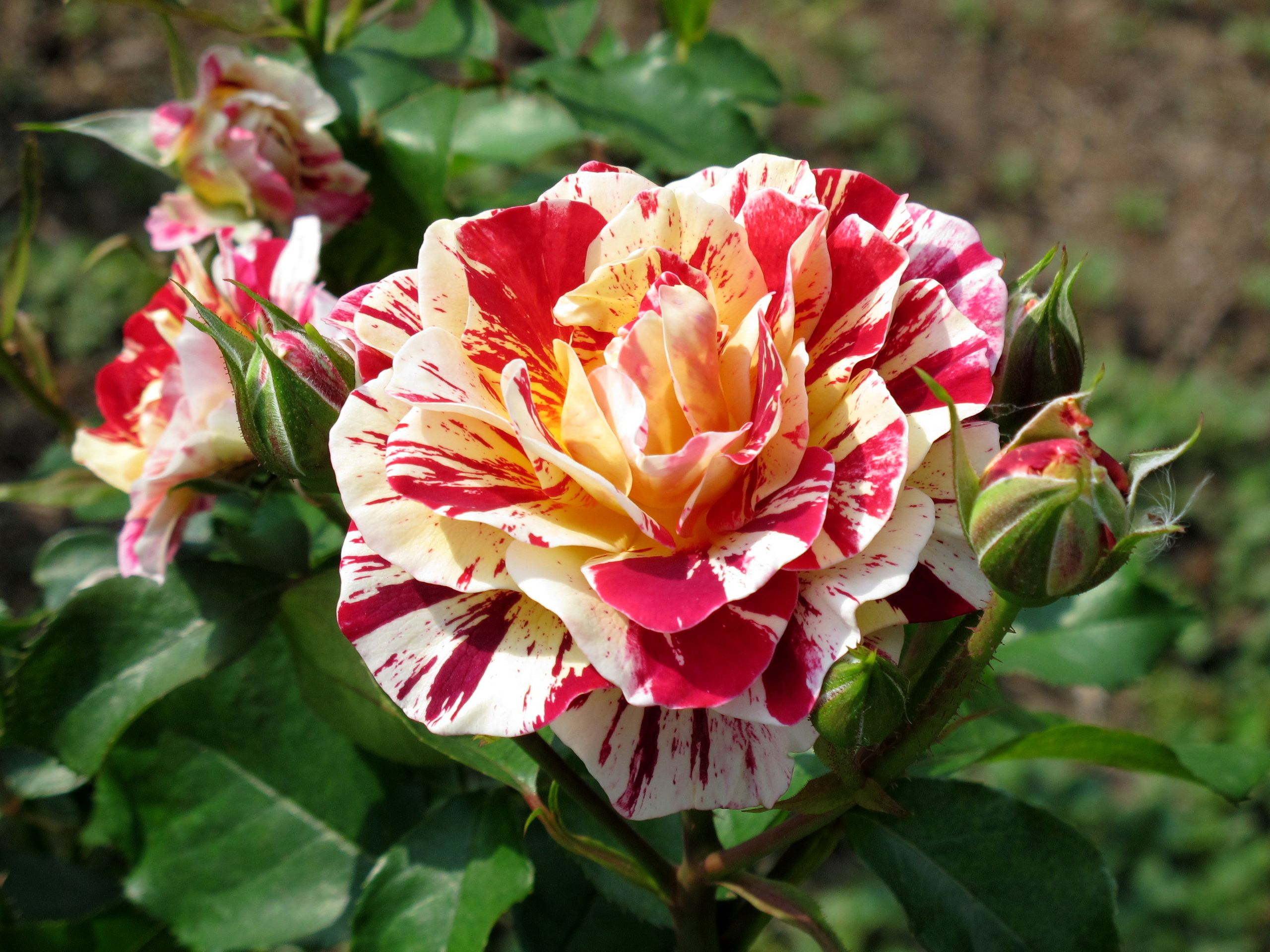
Parent, 'George Burns'

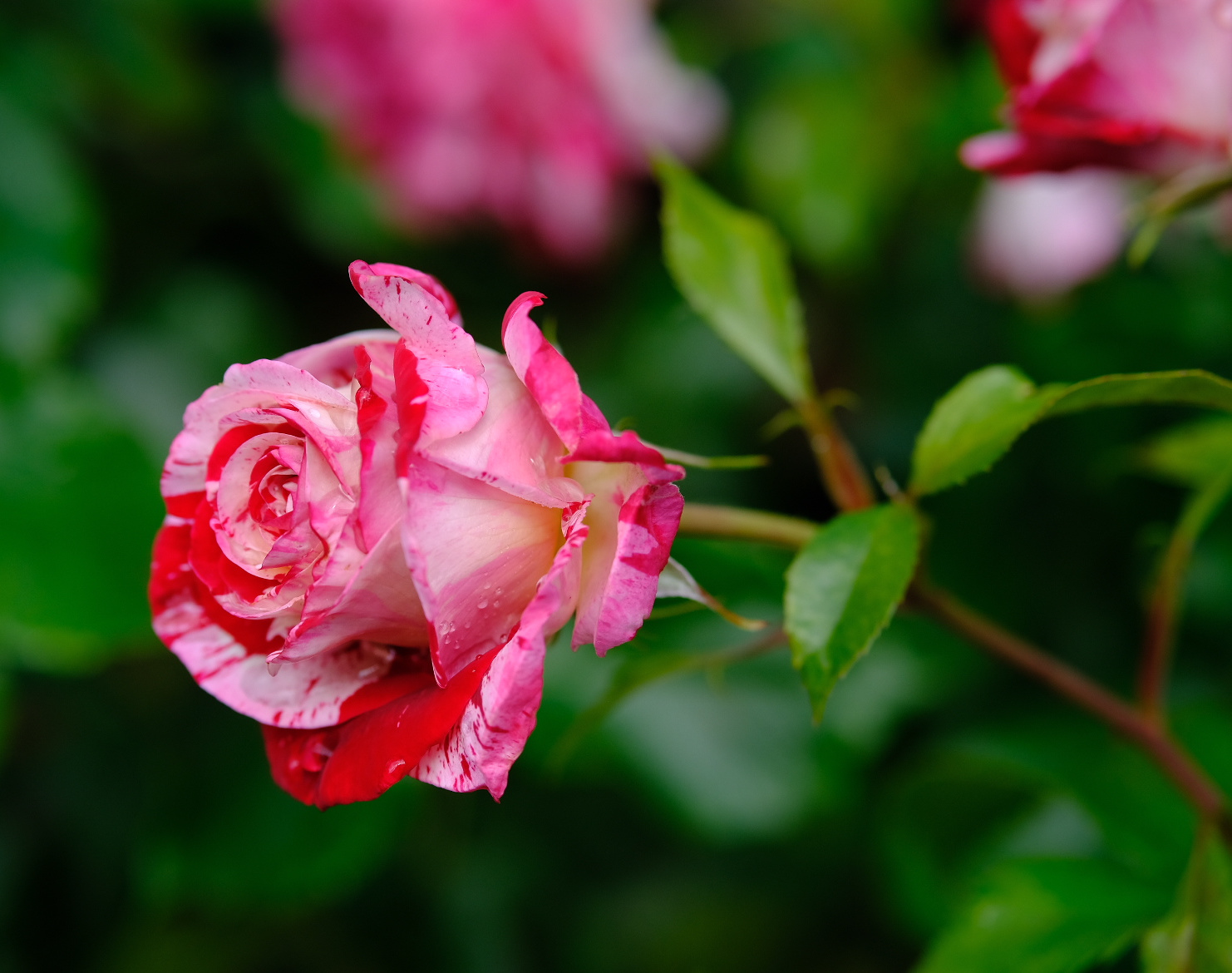
'Rock & Roll' rose

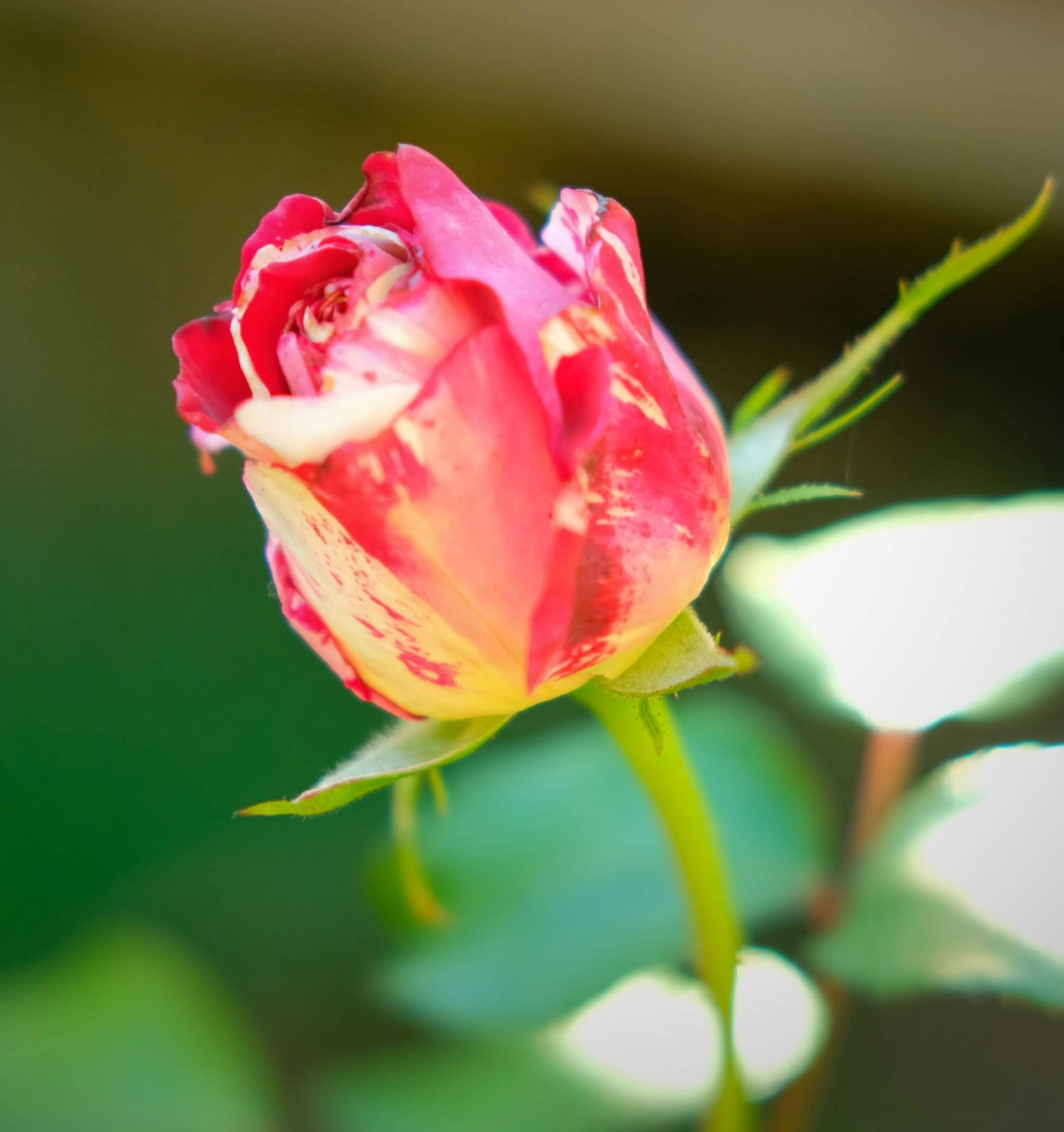
'Rock & Roll' rose bud

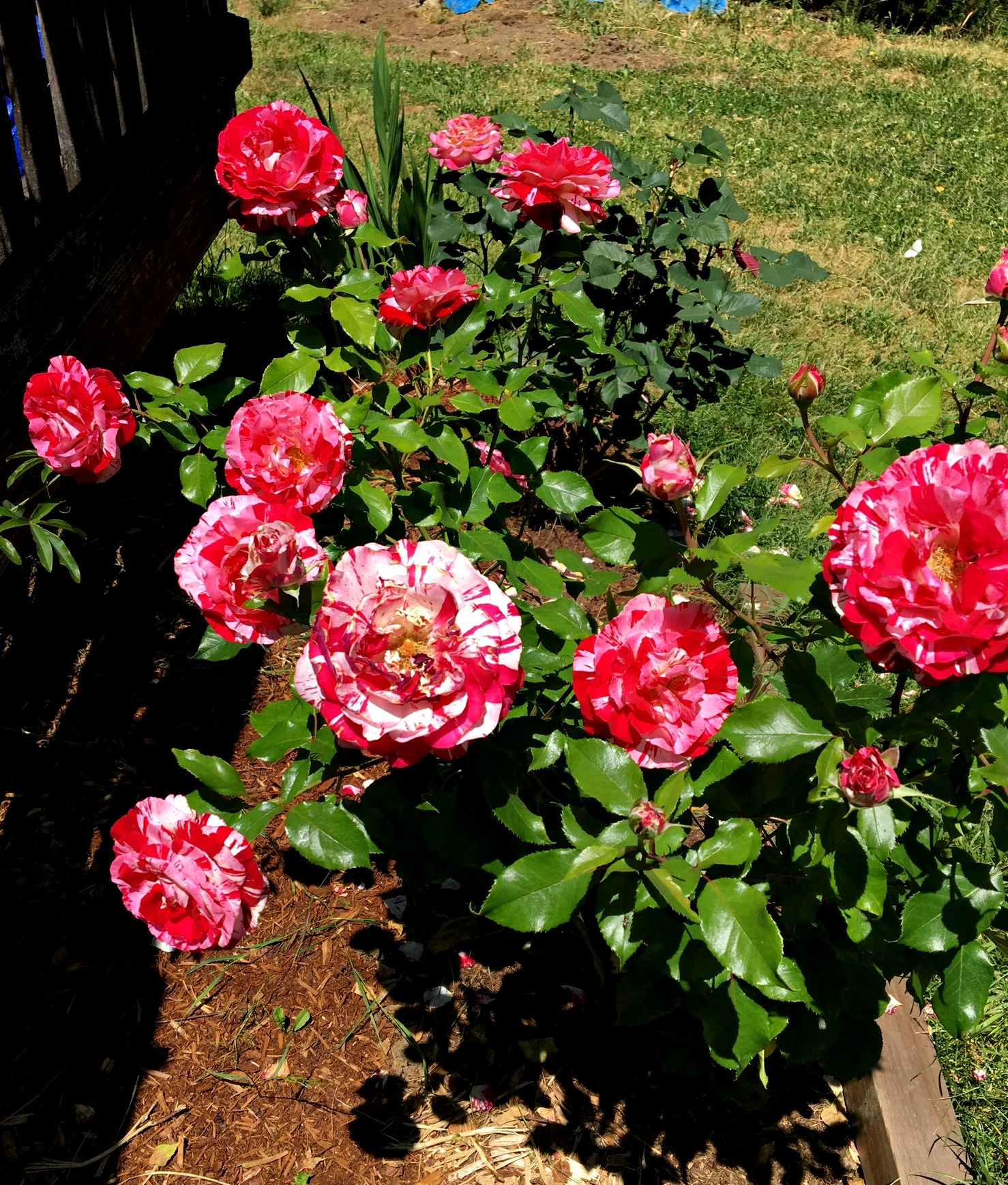
'Rock & Roll' shrub

== See also ==
- Garden roses
- Rose Hall of Fame
- List of Award of Garden Merit roses
- All-America Rose Selections
