= Rosa 'Rockin Robin' =

Red, pink and white shrub rose

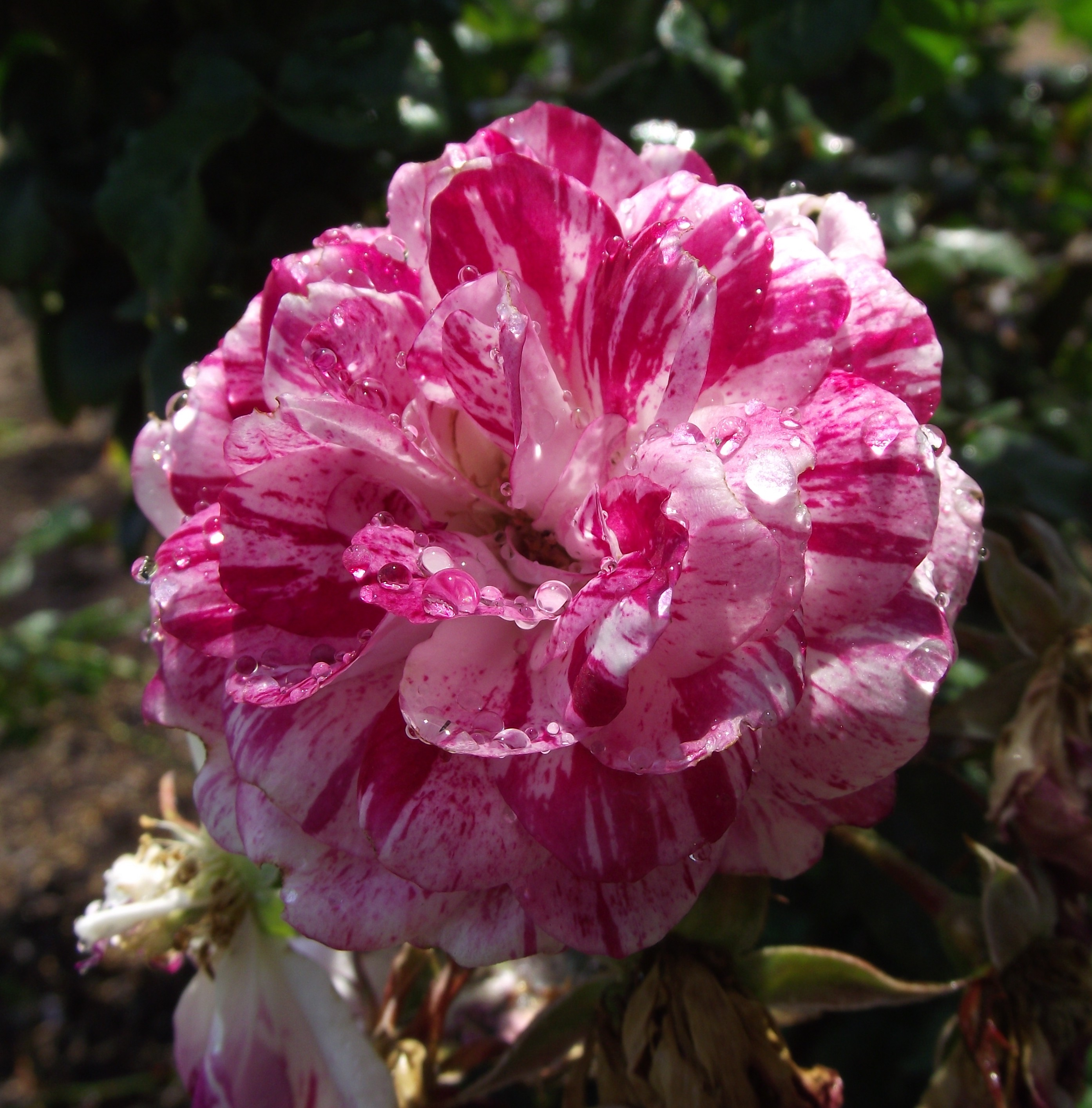
- Rosa 'Rockin Robin'
- Genus: Rosa 'Hybrid'
- Cultivar group: Shrub rose
- Cultivar: WEKboroco
- Origin: Tom Carruth (United States, 1997)

Rosa 'Rockin Robin' (a.k.a. WEKboroco) is a pink, red, and white striped shrub rose rose cultivar, bred by American rose breeder, Tom Carruth, and introduced by Weeks Wholesale Rose Grower in 1997.

== Description ==
'Rockin Robin' is a medium, bushy, spreading shrub rose, 4.25 in to 5.25 ft (130–160 cm) in height, and a 47 in to 4.7 ft (120–140 cm) spread. Petals are small to medium in size, with blooms of 2.75 in (7 cm) in diameter on average. Flowers have a cupped, globular form, with 26 to 40 petals, and bloom in small clusters. Flowers are pink, red and white in color with a striped pattern. The rose has a mild apple fragrance. The plant blooms continuously throughout the growing season. It is very disease and mildew resistant. It has small, semi-glossy, leathery foliage.

== History ==
=== Tom Carruth ===
Carruth began his career at Jackson & Perkins rose nursery in 1975. He worked at the company for three years before being hired by Armstrong nursery in southern California. He worked at Armstrong for seven years, working with rose hybridizer, Jack Christensen. In 1986, Carruth began working at Weeks Wholesale Rose Grower. He worked at Weeks for twenty six years, and was the nursery's rose hybridizer from 1989 until his retirement in 2012. During his forty-year career, Carruth introduced more than 100 rose varieties, including eleven All-America Rose Selections (AARS).

=== 'Rockin Robin' ===
'Rockin Robin' was created by Carruth and introduced into the United States by Weeks Wholesale Rose Grower, Inc. in 1997. The stock parents of this rose variety are the shrub rose 'Bonica' and the miniature red climber, 'Roller Coaster'. The cultivar won an award at the El Paso Rose Society Show in 1998.

== See also ==
- Garden roses
- Rose Hall of Fame
- List of Award of Garden Merit roses
