= Rosa 'Fourth of July' =

Red and white climbing rose

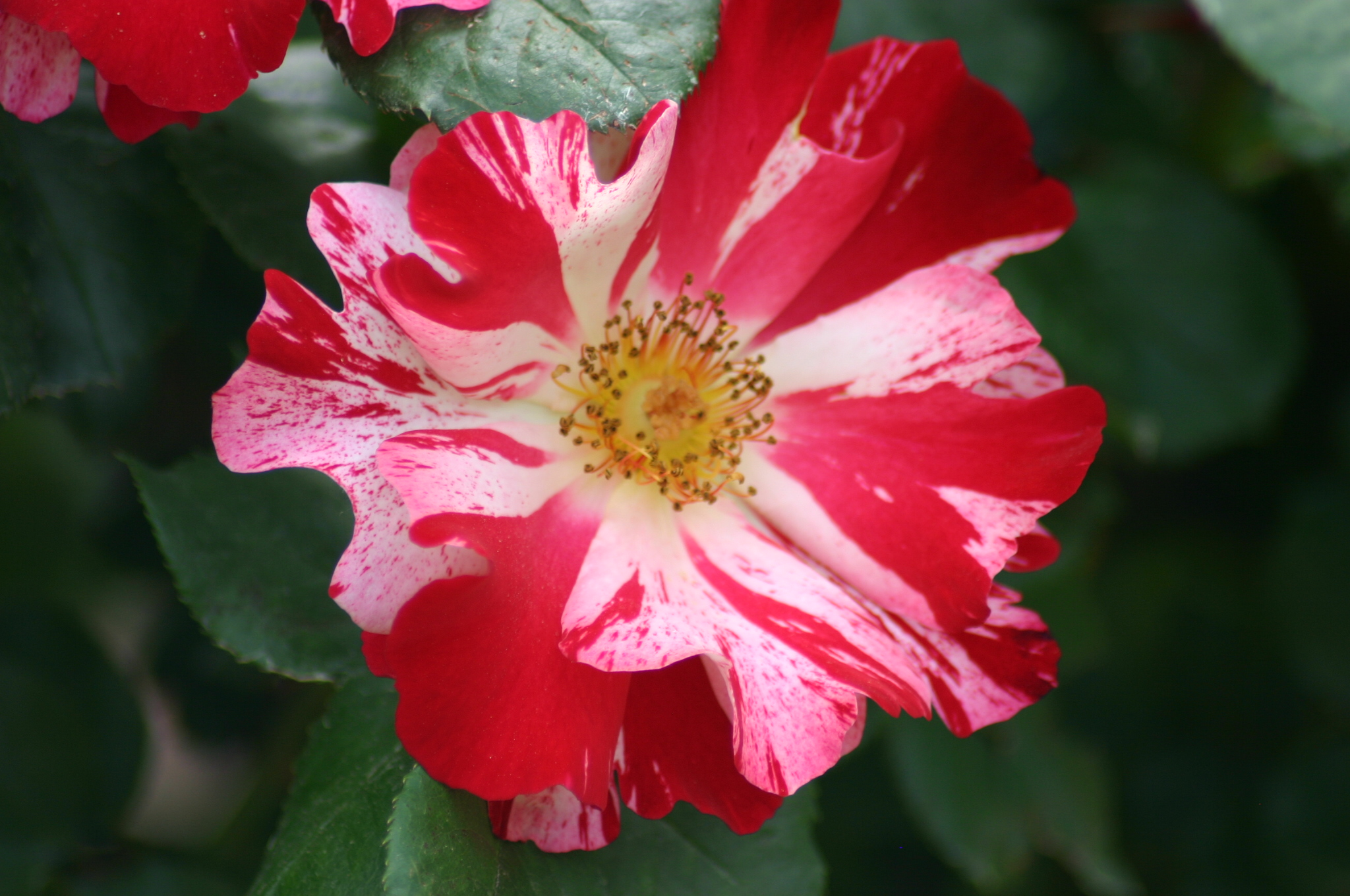
- Rosa 'Fourth of July'
- Genus: Rosa 'Hybrid'
- Cultivar group: Modern climbing rose
- Cultivar: WEKroalt
- Marketing names: 'Fourth of July', 'Crazy for You', 'Hanabi'
- Origin: Tom Carruth (United States, 1999)

Rosa 'Fourth of July', (aka WEKroalt ) is a red and white climbing rose cultivar, bred by American rose breeder, Tom Carruth, and introduced by Weeks Wholesale Rose Grower in 1999. The rose was named an All-America Rose Selections in 1999.

== Description ==
'Fourth of July' is a vigorous, large-flowered climbing rose, 43 in to 15 ft (110–455 cm) in height and 26 in to 6 ft (65–185 cm) spread. Buds are pointed and slow in opening. Blooms are 2 in (5 cm) in diameter on average. Flowers are large, semi-double, and saucer shaped in form. Flowers are bright red and bright white in color with gold stamens. The rose has a moderate apple and rose fragrance. The plant blooms in flushes from spring to autumn. It is very disease resistant and has dark, glossy green foliage. 'Fourth of July' may also be grown as a shrub rose in cooler climates.

== History ==
=== Tom Carruth ===
Carruth began his career at Jackson & Perkins rose nursery in 1975. He worked at the company for three years before being hired by Armstrong nursery in southern California. He worked at Armstrong for seven years, working with rose hybridizer, Jack Christensen. In 1986, Carruth began working at Weeks Wholesale Rose Grower. He worked at Weeks for twenty six years, and was the nursery's rose hybridizer from 1989 until his retirement in 2012. During his forty-year career, Carruth introduced more than 100 rose varieties, including eleven All-America Rose Selections (AARS).

=== 'Fourth of July' ===
'Fourth of July' was created by American rose breeder, Tom Carruth and introduced into the United States by Weeks Wholesale Rose Grower, Inc. in 1999. The stock parents of this rose variety are the red climber 'Altissimo' and the miniature red climber, 'Roller Coaster'. The cultivar was named an All-America Rose Selections in 1999. The rose cultivar was used to develop three rose varieties: 'Navy Lady' (2003), 'Soaring Spirits' (2004) and 'Dick Clark' (2009).

== See also ==
- Garden roses
- Rose Hall of Fame
- List of Award of Garden Merit roses
