= Rosa 'About Face' =

Grandiflora rose cultivar

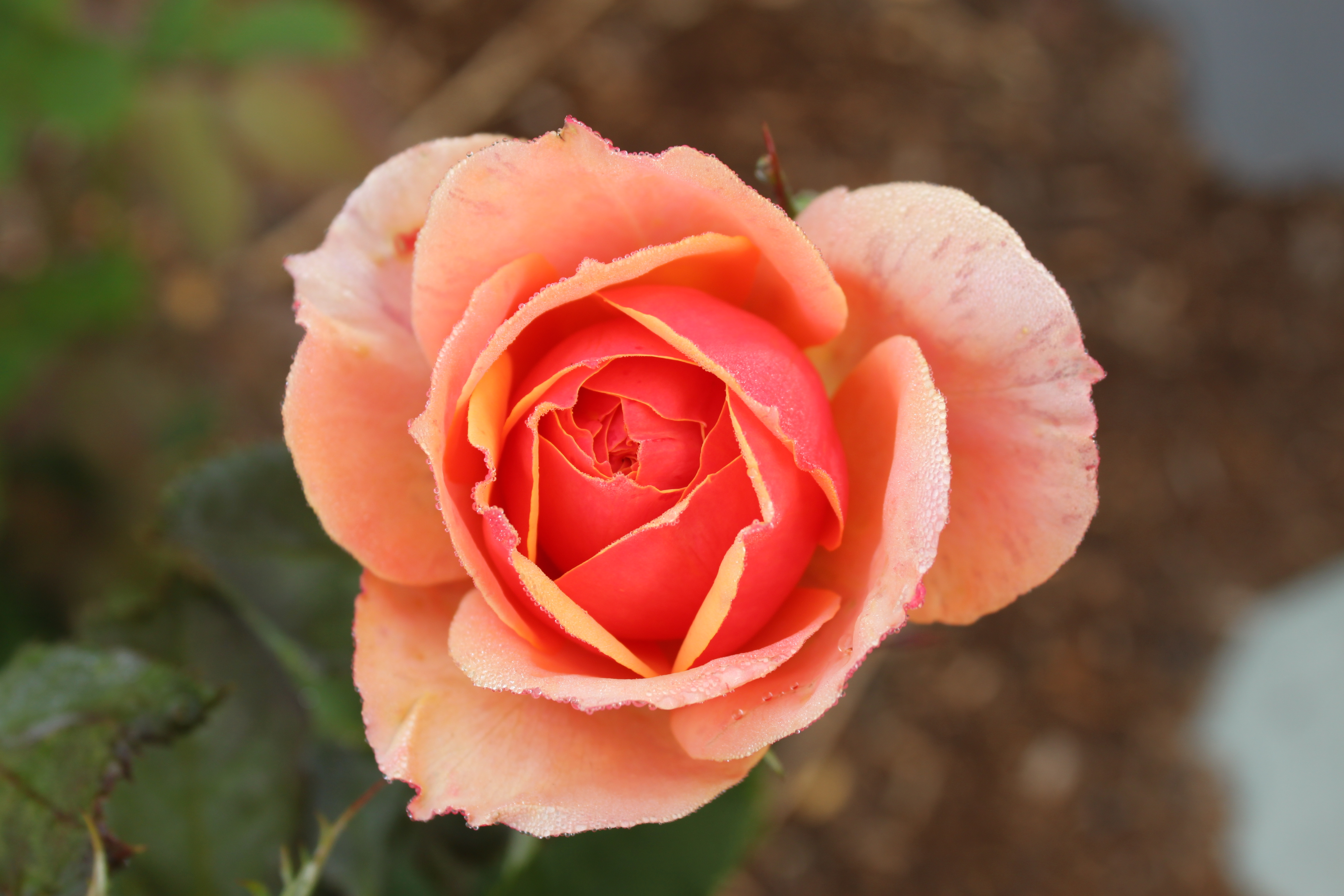
- Rosa 'About Face'
- Genus: Rosa hybrid
- Hybrid parentage: (('O Sole Mio' x Unnamed Seedling) x 'Midas Touch') x 'Hot Cocoa'
- Cultivar group: Grandiflora
- Cultivar: WEKosupalz
- Breeder: Carruth
- Origin: United States, 2003

Rosa 'About Face', (a.k.a. WEKosupalz), is an orange grandiflora rose cultivar, bred by Tom Carruth in 2003, and introduced into the United States by Jackson & Perkins in 2005. The rose was named an All-America Rose Selections winner in 2005.

== Description ==
'About Face' is a tall upright shrub, 5 to 6 ft (150—185 cm) in height with a 3 to 4 ft (90—120 cm) spread. Blooms are medium-large, 4—5 in (10—12 cm) in diameter, with a full, cupped, old fashioned bloom form, and a petal count of 26 to 35. Blooms are generally borne singly on long stems, or in small clusters. The flowers are orange-yellow on the outside, with a reverse of dark orange-red, eventually fading to pink and yellow. The rose has a strong, apple fragrance and large, glossy, dark green foliage. 'About Face' is very disease resistant. It blooms in flushes from spring through fall. The plants does well in USDA zone 6b and warmer.

== Child plants ==
'About Face' was used to hybridize two child plants. Rosa 'Anna's Promise', bred by Tom Carruth in 2013, was created from a cross between 'Voodoo' and 'About Face'. 'Anna's Promise' is a grandiflora rose cultivar. Its flowers are orange and pink in color, with a copper reverse. Rosa 'Good as Gold' is a hybrid tea rose, bred by Tom Carruth before 2013. Its stock parents are 'Golden Beauty' and 'About Face'. The flowers are orange and yellow with touches of red.

== Awards ==
- All-America Rose Selections (AARS) winner, USA, (2005)

== See also ==
- Garden roses
- Rose Hall of Fame
- List of Award of Garden Merit roses
