= Harry & David =

American premium food and gift company

Harry and David, LLC
- Trade name: Harry & David
- Formerly: Bear Creek Orchards (1910–1946)
- Type: Subsidiary
- Industry: Food and gifts
- Founded: 1910; 116 years ago in Medford, Oregon (as Bear Creek Orchards); 1946; 80 years ago (as Harry and David)
- Founder: Samuel Rosenberg
- Headquarters: Medford, Oregon, U.S.
- Number of locations: 1 retail location (flagship store in Medford, Oregon); Two operational locations: Medford, Oregon (headquarters, orchards, manufacturing and distribution); Hebron, Ohio (distribution center)
- Area served: United States
- Key people: Joseph Rowland (president)
- Products: Gift baskets; Holiday and special occasions gifts; Pears and fruit; Flowers and plants; Chocolates and sweets
- Number of employees: 8,000 including seasonal employees (2013)
- Parent: 1-800-Flowers.com (2014–present)
- Website: harryanddavid.com

Harry and David, LLC (Harry and David) is an American-based premium food and gift producer and retailer. The company sells its products through direct mail, online, corporate gifting, and in their flagship location in Medford, Oregon, and operates the brands Harry & David, Wolferman's, and Vital Choice.

Harry & David was founded in 1910 by Samuel Rosenberg as Bear Creek Orchards in Medford as a premium fruit company.

As of 2014, it has been owned by 1-800-Flowers.com.

== History ==
=== Bear Creek Orchards ===
The company first began operations in 1910, when Samuel Rosenberg purchased Comice pear orchards in Southern Oregon after encountering the orchard's pears at the previous year's Alaska–Yukon–Pacific Exposition. Located in Medford, Oregon, the pear orchards themselves dated from 1885, and were named Bear Creek Orchards after Bear Creek, which ran through the property.

In 1914, Rosenberg's sons Harry and David Rosenberg took over the management of the property, after their father's death and the completion of their agricultural degrees at Cornell University. The brothers named the pears "Royal Riviera," and focused on selling them to customers in Europe. As their business continued to grow in the 1920s, the brothers built a packing house and a pre-cooling plant to prepare the pears to be shipped long distances.

When the Great Depression reduced the demand for their pears in Europe, the brothers began to market their products to customers in the United States, first to businessmen in Seattle, and by 1934, to customers in San Francisco and New York City.

The company officially began to sell its products to customers via mail order in 1934. The brothers advertised in magazines and newspapers, with their first ad appearing in Fortune in 1936. Other ads appeared in National Geographic, The New York Times and Time.

In 1937, the company introduced its "Box of the Month" plan. This was later renamed the "Rare Fruit Club" and eventually the "Fruit of the Month" club.

In the late 1930s, Harry and David adopted their stepfather's last name, Holmes, due to concerns about rising antisemitism as World War II approached.

=== Harry and David ===
In 1946, the name Bear Creek Orchards was replaced, when the company incorporated under the name Harry and David. Following David Holmes Sr.'s death in 1950, the company was handed down to his son, David H. Holmes Jr., who served as president of Harry & David from 1955 to 1970. Harry Holmes died in 1959. While David H. Holmes Jr. was president, Harry & David acquired the rose company Jackson & Perkins. After 9 years, David H. Holmes Jr. (son of David Sr.) passed the business to his cousin, John R. H. Holmes (son of Harry Holmes).

In 1972, David H. Holmes Jr. created Bear Creek Corporation (a name similar to the original 1885–1914 names) as a parent company to Harry & David, as well as other subsidiaries. Bear Creek Corporation went public in 1976, and remained public until its purchase by RJR Nabisco in 1984. Two years later, the company was acquired by the Shaklee Corporation. Shaklee was then purchased in 1989 (along with its newly acquired subsidiary Bear Creek) by the Japanese firm Yamanouchi Pharmaceutical. During the 1990s, Harry & David expanded its retail locations, opening more than 119 stores. Bear Creek Corporation launched its website in 1996 to sell all of its product lines, including Harry & David.

In June 2004, approximately 97% ownership of Harry & David was acquired by two investment firms in the United States: Wasserstein & Co. of New York, which purchased 63% of the company's stock; and Highfields Capital Management of Boston, which acquired 34%. In 2007, Harry & David sold the rose business Jackson & Perkins, to focus solely on its gift and premium food business. The next year the company acquired two online and catalog retailers: Wolferman's, which specializes in English muffins and breakfast foods; and Cushman's, a Florida-based fruit company specializing in a tangerine-grapefruit hybrid.

After the private-equity buyout in 2004, and the efforts at diversification through acquisitions, the financial downturn of the late 2000s hurt Harry & David's revenues and sales. The company's debt from its 2004 acquisition was part of the reason the recession hurt the company. In March 2011, the company filed for Chapter 11 bankruptcy protection. Harry & David remained operational while in bankruptcy and, in May 2011, filed a reorganization plan in bankruptcy court. The company emerged from bankruptcy in September 2011. Following its exit from bankruptcy, Harry & David increased its profitability and revenue and, in September 2012, was named the "large company turnaround of the year" by the Turnaround Management Association.

In November 2012, the company established a winery using Oregon grapes; the white and red wines were developed in partnership with a local winemaker. The company began selling its winery wines through its website that same year. Harry & David was sold in August 2014 to internet retailer 1-800-Flowers for $142.5 million. Harry & David is a wholly owned subsidiary of 1-800-Flowers.com Inc. and Harry & David Operations, Inc. The company's CEO from October 2011 through February 2015 was Craig Johnson. Steven Lightman (briefly CEO of The Sharper Image from 2007 to 2008) became CEO of Harry & David in March 2015.

At the end of April 2020, Harry & David permanently closed nearly all of its brick-and-mortar retail stores, except for its flagship Country Village store in Medford.

== Operations ==
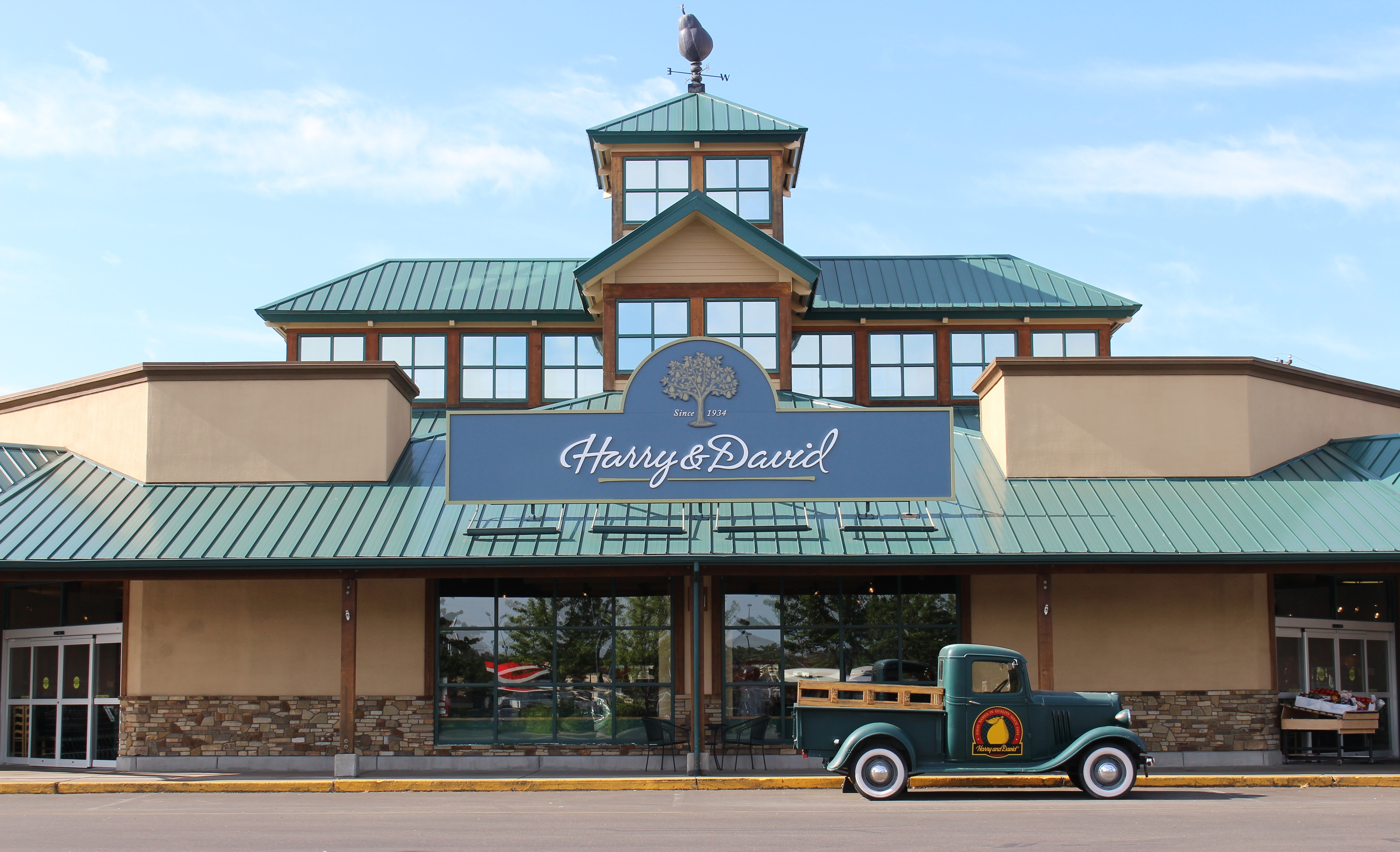
Harry & David's Medford store

Harry & David produces and sells premium food and gifts under three brands: Harry & David; Wolferman's; and Stockyards. Harry & David's product lines include gift baskets, flowers and plants, fresh fruit, chocolate and sweets, and wine. Wolferman's main products include gourmet English muffins and other breakfast foods, and Stockyards is primarily known for selling USDA Prime and Choice quality meats and chops.

The company operates three individual websites for its brands on the 1800flowers.com multi-brand portal, HarryAndDavid.com, Wolfermans.com and Stockyards.com. In addition to selling online and through mail order, Harry & David's brands are sold in its retail stores nationwide. As of 2013, there were approximately fifty permanent retail locations and thirty temporary stores open for the holiday season. Cashflow is highly cyclical; Harry & David earns the majority of its profits in the fall and winter as a result of holiday-related orders.

Harry & David is headquartered in Medford, Oregon, where as of 2015 the company is the Rogue Valley's largest non-medical employer. As of 2007, the company operated 2,000 acres of orchards, manufacturing facilities and a distribution center in Medford. In 1997, Harry & David opened a second office in Hebron, Ohio, called the Hopewell Campus, which handles distribution, which caught fire in 2026. The company employed more than 8,000 employees in 2013, including temporary seasonal workers. As of 2015, the company has begun planting orchards as part of their long-term corporate strategy.

=== Naming rights ===
The company owns the naming rights to Medford's main baseball park, Harry & David Field.

== See also ==
- List of companies based in Oregon

== Bibliography ==
- Snyder, Gail (2009). First Names in Gifting: The Story of Harry and David. Bookhouse Group. ISBN 9780615316451.
- Jay P. Pederson (2001). International Directory of Company Histories. St. James Press. p. 38. ISBN 1-55862-445-7.
