= Rosa 'George Burns' =

Floribunda rose cultivar

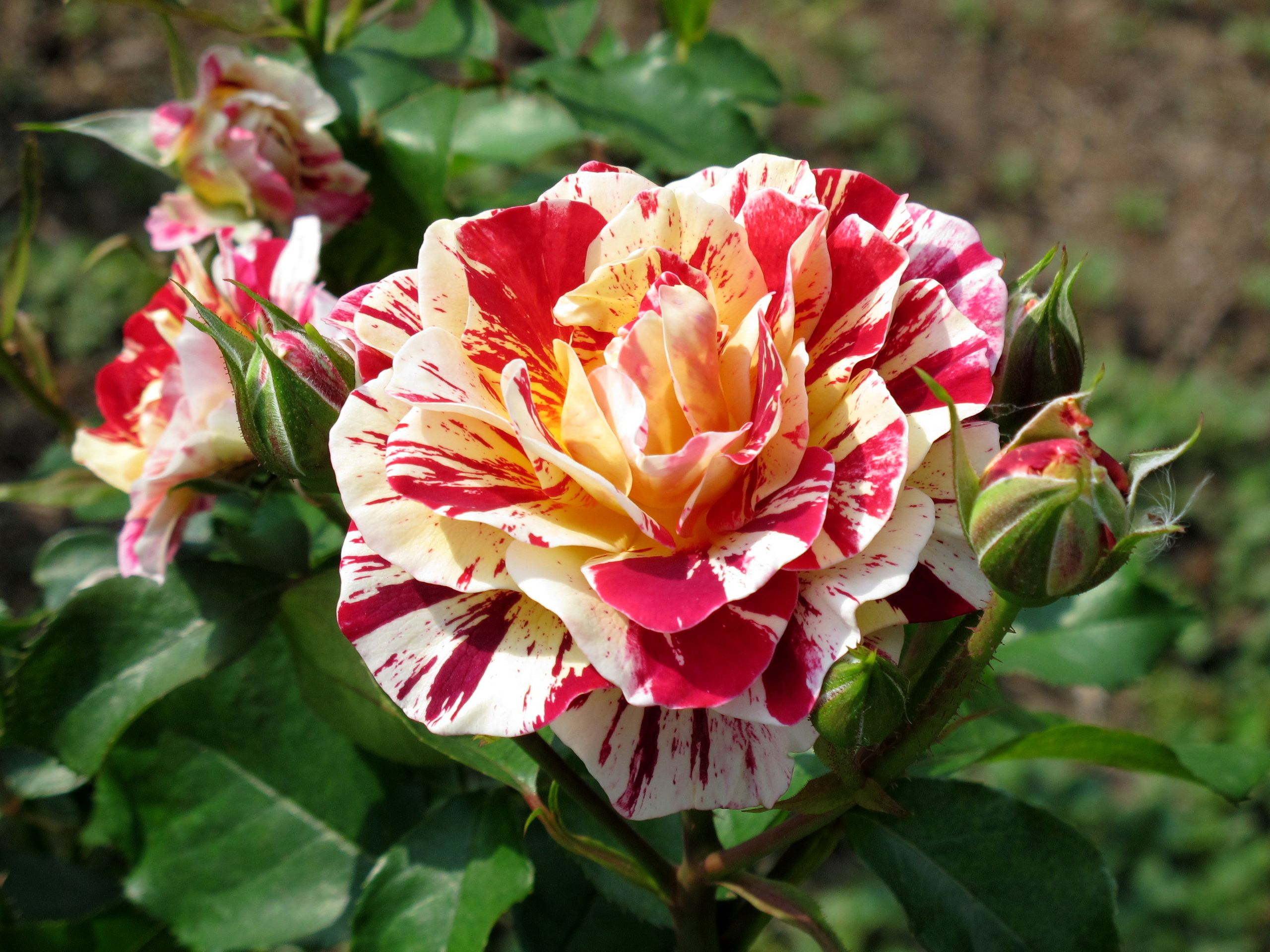
- George Burns rose
- Genus: Rosa 'Hybrid'
- Hybrid parentage: Calico (hybrid tea) x Roller Coaster
- Cultivar group: Floribunda
- Cultivar: WEKcalroc
- Marketing names: 'Paparazzi' 'Rodeo Clown' 'Glamourpuss'.
- Origin: Tom Carruth (United States, 1996)

The Rosa 'George Burns' is a yellow and red striped Floribunda rose cultivar, developed in the United States by Tom Carruth in 1996. The rose was introduced in 1997 by Spring Hill Nurseries.

== History ==
'George Burns' was created by American rose breeder, Tom Carruth, in 1996. and introduced into the United States in 1997 by Spring Hill Nurseries. In 2019, the rose was introduced in Australia under the name, 'Glamourpuss', by Swane's Nursery . The stock parents of 'George Burns' are the pink-blend hybrid tea rose cultivar, 'Calico' and the red-blend hybrid tea rose, 'Roller Coaster' (McGredy IV 1987). A Grandiflora rose cultivar, 'Rock & Roll' was developed by Carruth in 2006, by crossing 'George Burns' and (hybrid tea) 'New Zealand'.

== Description ==
'George Burns' is a compact, repeat-blooming shrub, 3 to 4 ft (91-121 cm) in height and a 2 to 3 ft (60-91 cm) spread. Blooms are 4 in (10 cm) in diameter on average, and can have 26 to 40 petals in small clusters. Flowers are ruffled with a strong, citrus-like fragrance. Blooms are full with stripes and splashes of color changing from lemon yellow and deep red to rose pink and cream. Cooler temperatures bring out the yellow hues in the rose. 'George Burns' is a disease resistant plant with dark, glossy green foliage.

== See also ==
- Garden roses
- Rose Hall of Fame
- List of Award of Garden Merit roses
