= Rosa 'Betty Boop' =

Rose cultivar

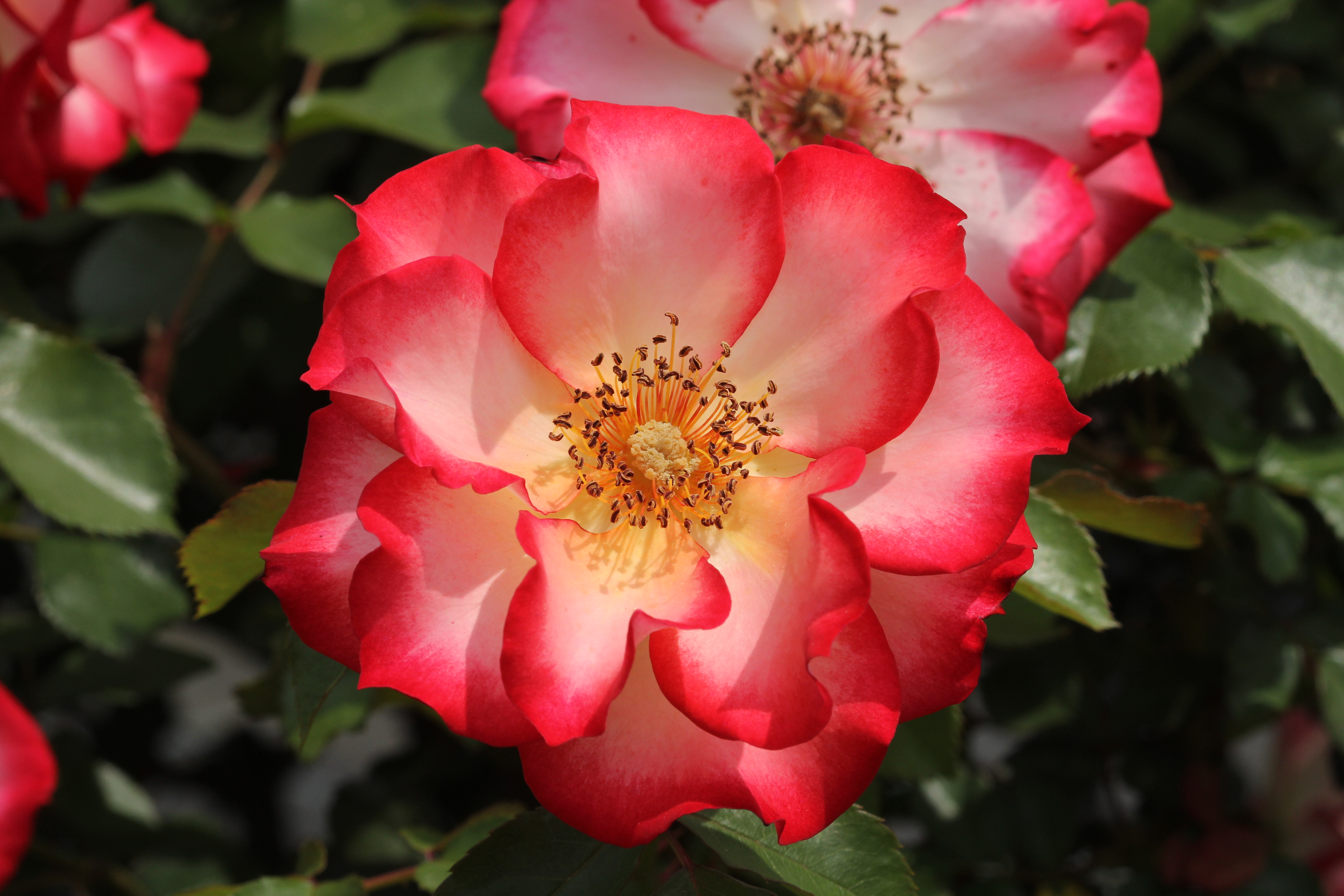
- Rosa 'Betty Boop'
- Genus: Rosa hybrid
- Hybrid parentage: 'Playboy' x 'Picasso'
- Cultivar group: Floribunda
- Cultivar: WEKplapic
- Marketing names: 'Betty Boop'
- Breeder: Carruth
- Origin: United States, 1999

Rosa 'Betty Boop', (synonym WEKplapic), is a floribunda rose cultivar bred by American hybridizer, and introduced into the United States by Weeks Roses in 1999. 'Betty Boop' was named an All-America Rose Selections winner in 1999.

== History ==
'Betty Boop', developed by rose grower, Tom Carruth, was named for a popular American cartoon character in the 1930s called Betty Boop. The rose cultivar was introduced into the United States by Weeks Roses in 1999. The plant's stock parents are the floribundas, Rosa 'Playboy' and Rosa 'Picasso' 'Betty Boop' was used to hybridize the following rose varieties: Rosa 'Miss Congeniality', (2014), Rosa 'Topsy Turvy', (2005), Rosa 'Watercolors', (2006). The cultivar was named an All-America Rose Selections winner in 1999.

== Description ==
'Betty Boop' is a medium, upright bushy shrub, 3 to 5 ft (90–151 cm) in height with a 3 to 4 ft (90–120 cm) spread. Flowers open from pointed, nearly black buds. Blooms are 2—3 in (5–7 cm) in diameter, saucer-shaped, with semi-double (8—15) petals. Flowers are red and white, with red edges and yellow stamens. Blooms have a strong, fruity fragrance. 'Betty Boop' blooms in flushes from spring through fall, and is very disease resistant. The shrub has medium, glossy, dark green foliage. The plant thrives in a wide variety of climates; it tolerates rain, heat and cold very well.

== Awards ==
- All-America Rose Selections (AARS) winner, USA, (1999)

== See also ==
- Garden roses
- Rose Hall of Fame
- List of Award of Garden Merit roses
