= Jackson & Perkins =

American company selling roses

Coordinates: 34.29515°N 82.23677°W

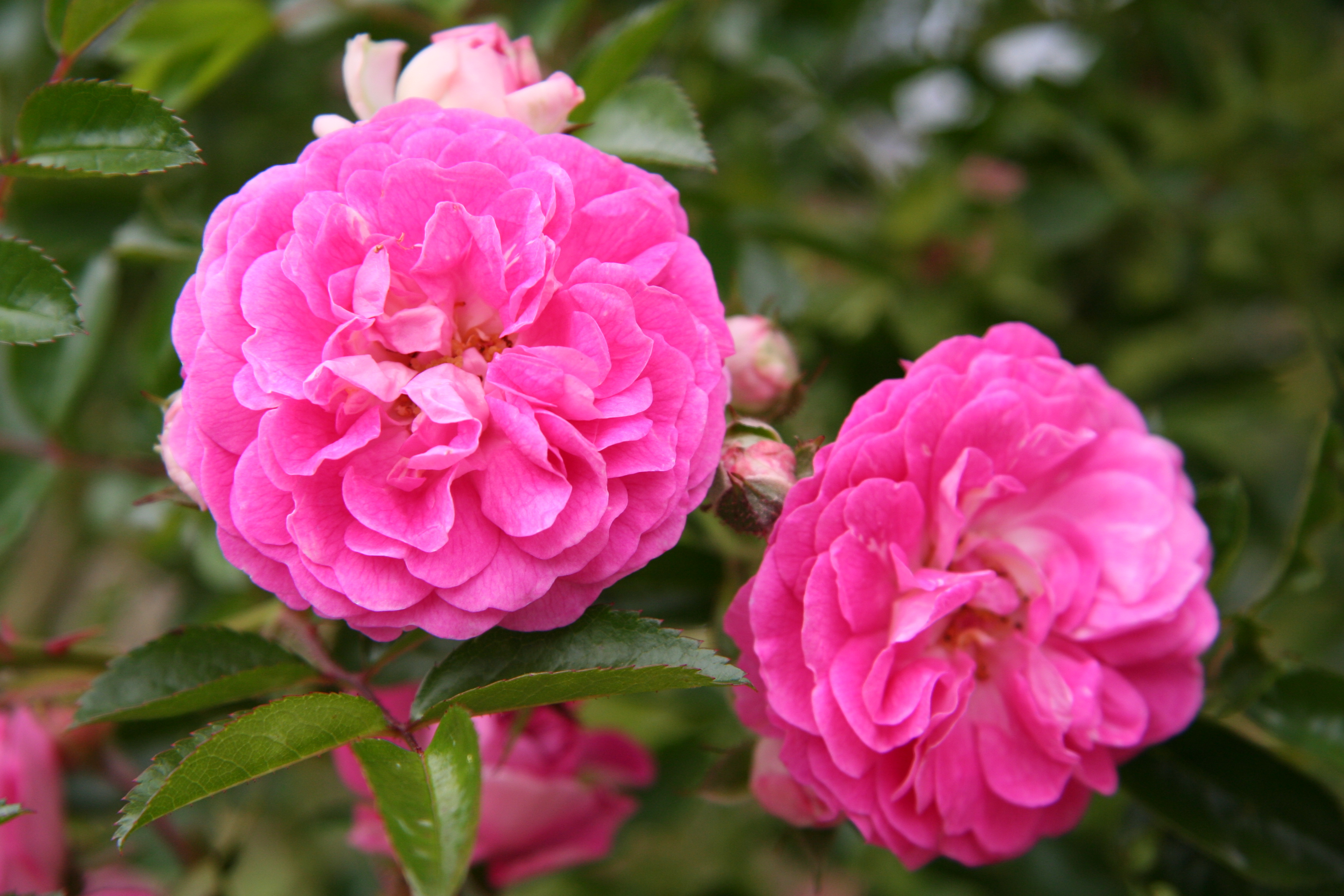
Dorothy Perkins Rose, the first successful rose cultivar introduced by Jackson & Perkins

Jackson & Perkins Company, commonly known as Jackson & Perkins, is an American company that cultivates roses. Since its founding in 1872, Jackson & Perkins has grown to sell other products, including live plants, garden accessories, holiday gifts, and home decor.

== History ==
=== Early history ===
The company's name came from the two partners who started the business, Charles H. Perkins (1840–1924) and his father-in-law, Albert E. Jackson (1807–1895). The company began in 1872, in Newark, New York, as a truck farm selling strawberries, raspberries, and grapes. Perkins became interested in the wholesale nursery business and he began selling vines and shrubs to nearby retail nurseries.

In 1882, Charles became fascinated with rose propagation. In 1884, he hired Alvin Miller as foreman of his newly evolving rose business. Miller, a hybridizer, was directed to develop a special rose new to the rose market. His first success, introduced in 1901, was the Dorothy Perkins rose, named for Charles Perkins' granddaughter Dorothy. In 1908, this rose won top honors at the Royal National Rose Society. It also started a long tradition of naming roses for people. This rose has been mentioned by several authors in their works, including F. Scott Fitzgerald. Jackson & Perkins stopped marketing the original Dorothy Perkins rose because the plant was prone to mildew and disease. It is still available from specialty nurseries. To this day the Dorothy Perkins climbing rose adorns the walls of Windsor Castle.

Jackson & Perkins remained a family affair when, in 1928, Charles "Charlie" Perkins, nephew of the founder, succeeded his cousin George C. Perkins as President. He furthered the company's involvement in rose hybridization by hiring Jean Henri Nicolas, an internationally known French hybridizer, to head the new, expanded rose hybridization department. The family home at Newark, known as the Jackson–Perkins House, was listed on the National Register of Historic Places in 2006.

After Nicolas's death in 1937, Eugene Boerner, his understudy, became J&P's head hybridizer. Boerner made great strides in the floribunda class of rose, a classification name coined by C.H. Perkins, a cousin of Charles. In 1939, Boerner increased J&P's stock of roses by collecting 10,000 cuttings from growers in Europe. These cuttings were instrumental in the successful propagation of new varieties.

J&P, along with other innovative growers, wanted protection for the plants they launched. The United States Congress, in 1931, extended plant patent protection to nurseries that developed and introduced new plants to the nursery trade. This law gives patent-holders seven years of competition-free production.

=== World's Fair rose ===
The 1939 New York World's Fair proved to be the perfect venue for introducing Jackson & Perkins roses to the nation. Charlie Perkins participated in the fair with a 10,000-square-foot (930 m^{2}) garden display holding 8,000 roses. World's Fair, a red floribunda rose, was the star attraction.

Approximately 40,000 people signed up to have information or the World's Fair rose shipped. This gave the company a ready-made customer list. Catalogs were developed, and the Jackson & Perkins mail order business, the first mail order rose nursery in the nation, was launched.

World's Fair was the winner of the first All-America Rose Selection competition, followed by a string of winners. Katherine T. Marshall won in 1944. Fashion, a coral-peach rose, won the AARS competition in 1950. The following years brought a string of champions: Vogue, Ma Perkins, Jiminy Cricket, White Bouquet, Gold Cup, and Ivory Fashion. Eugene Boerner won fourteen All-America rose honors, including three more awarded after his death.

Jackson & Perkins roses became the stars of the rose world, not just because of the development of hybrids, but also because of the attention given to naming the new introductions. Blaze and Fashion have lasting appeal. Star-struck names, such as Cary Grant, Dolly Parton, Kate Smith, and Arlene Francis could help propel a rose to popularity. Many of these roses are still in production.

=== Post Perkins-family ===
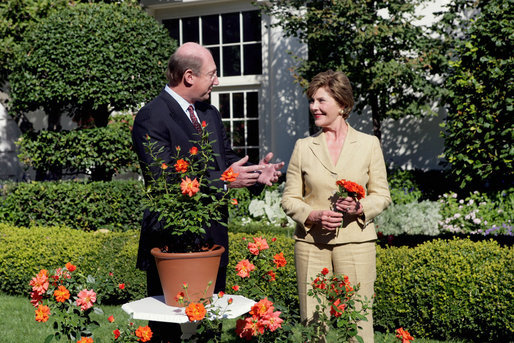
Harry and David CEO Bill Williams and First Lady Laura Bush in the White House Rose Garden during the unveiling of Jackson & Perkins' "Rosa 'Laura Bush'" in 2006

Charlie Perkins died in 1963, followed by Gene Boerner four years later. In 1966, Jackson & Perkins Company was purchased by Harry and David, the world's largest mail order fruit business. Bear Creek Corporation, an umbrella organization, was formed over Harry and David and Jackson & Perkins companies in 1972. Jackson & Perkins focused their business on mail order sales while Bear Creek Gardens oversaw garden center, mass market, and greenhouse sales.

Harry and David moved the rose hybridizing facility to Tustin, California, and hired William Warriner to continue the hybridizing work of Boerner. He introduced three hybrids, developed by Gene Boerner, which won AARS awards: "Gay Princess" in 1967, "Gene Boerner" in 1969, and "First Prize" in 1970. He went on to win nineteen All-America Awards for his rose introductions while working on J&P hybrids.

In 1984, the corporation was sold to R.J. Reynolds Development Corporation. Dr. Keith Zary succeeded Bill Warriner as Director of Research for J&P roses in 1985. He and his team continued the AARS award winning tradition with nine more AARS awards including Mardi Gras, the 2008 AARS award winner.

Bear Creek Corporation purchased Armstrong Nurseries in 1987. This old J&P rival in the rose industry had been a family-owned company. They were a charter member of AARS and held many awards for their roses. Patented varieties included Double Delight, Olympiad, Fire 'N' Ice, and Crystalline.

In 1986, Bear Creek Corporation, which included Jackson & Perkins, was purchased by Shaklee Corporation, which in turn was purchased by Yamanouchi Pharmaceutical Co. Ltd of Japan in 1989.

In 1997, Jackson & Perkins began internet sales of roses. What once was Bear Creek Gardens became Jackson & Perkins Wholesale. Over 300,000 seedlings are grown and evaluated every year at the research facility outside Somis, California. Jackson & Perkins wholesale (JPW) was created to sell to local garden centers as well as mass retailers.

On April 10, 2007, Harry and David Holdings sold most of the assets of Jackson & Perkins to an investment group headed by Donald and Glenda Hachenberger. Today, Jackson & Perkins is a division of Jackson & Perkins Park Acquisitions, which is a subsidiary of publicly traded Western Capital Resources. Jackson & Perkins Park Acquisitions encompasses three garden brands: Park Seed, Jackson & Perkins, and Wayside Gardens.

== Gallery ==
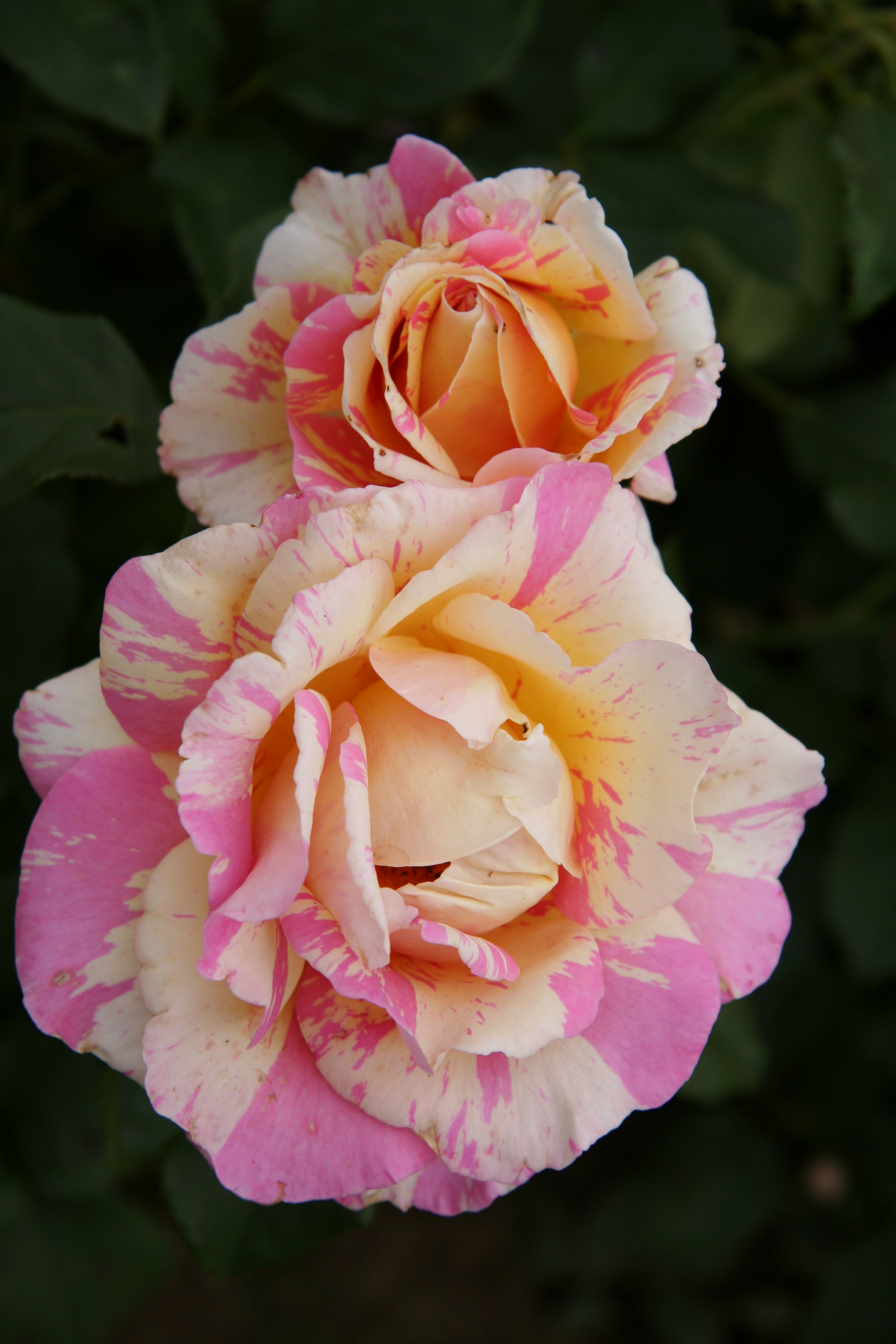
'Claude Monet', Zary 1992

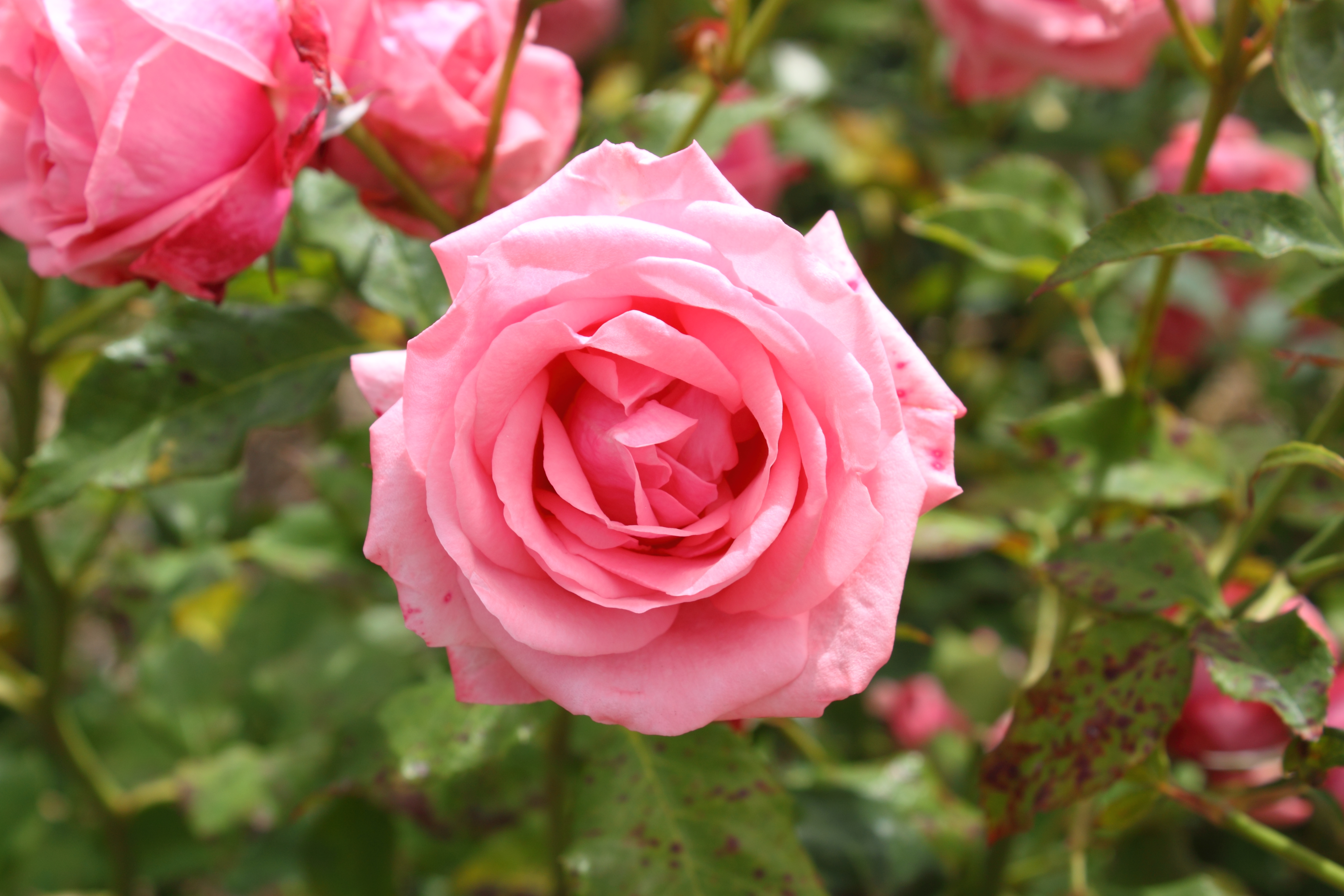
'Gene Boerner', Warriner 1968

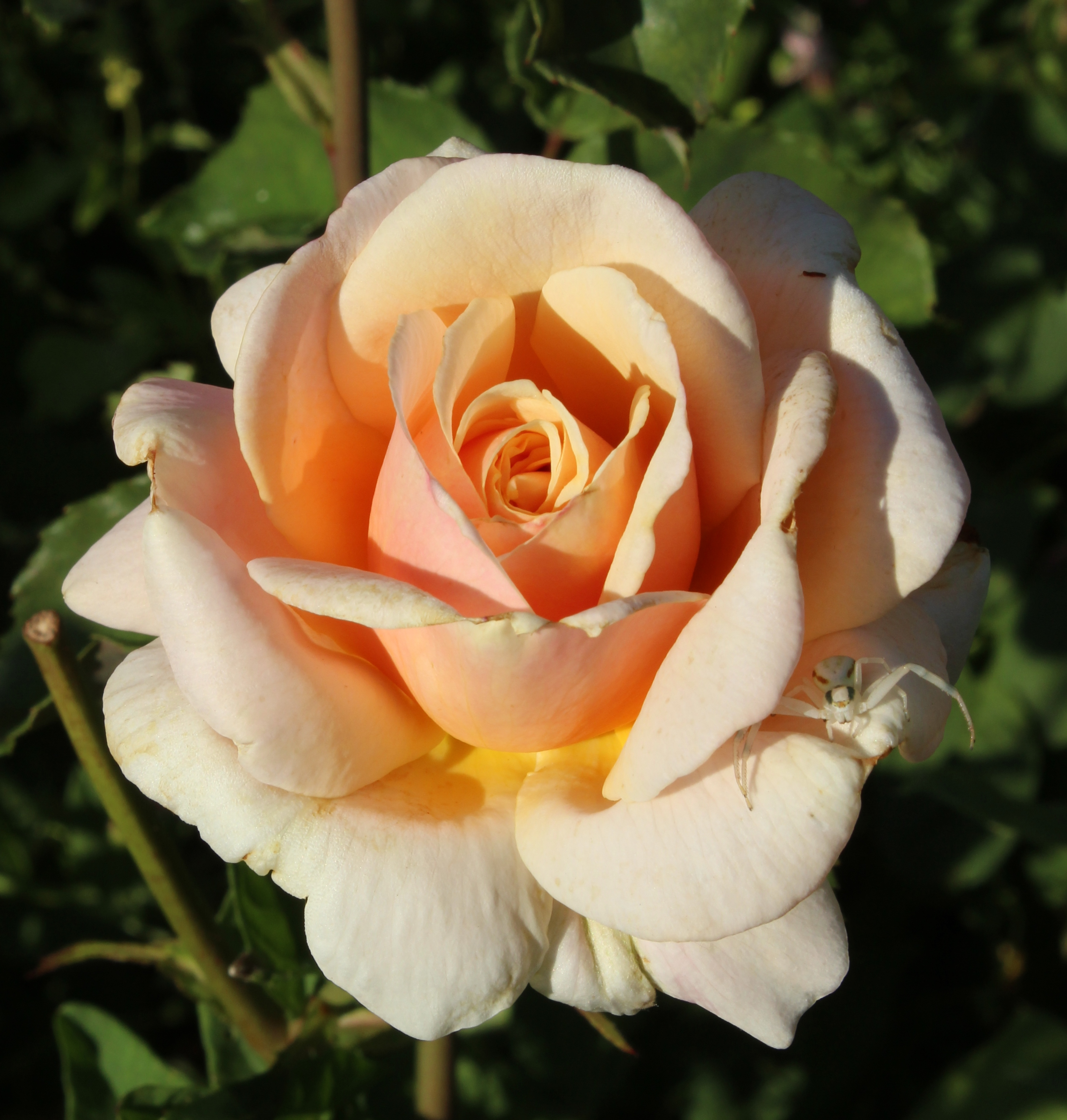
'Diamond Jubilee', Boerner 1947

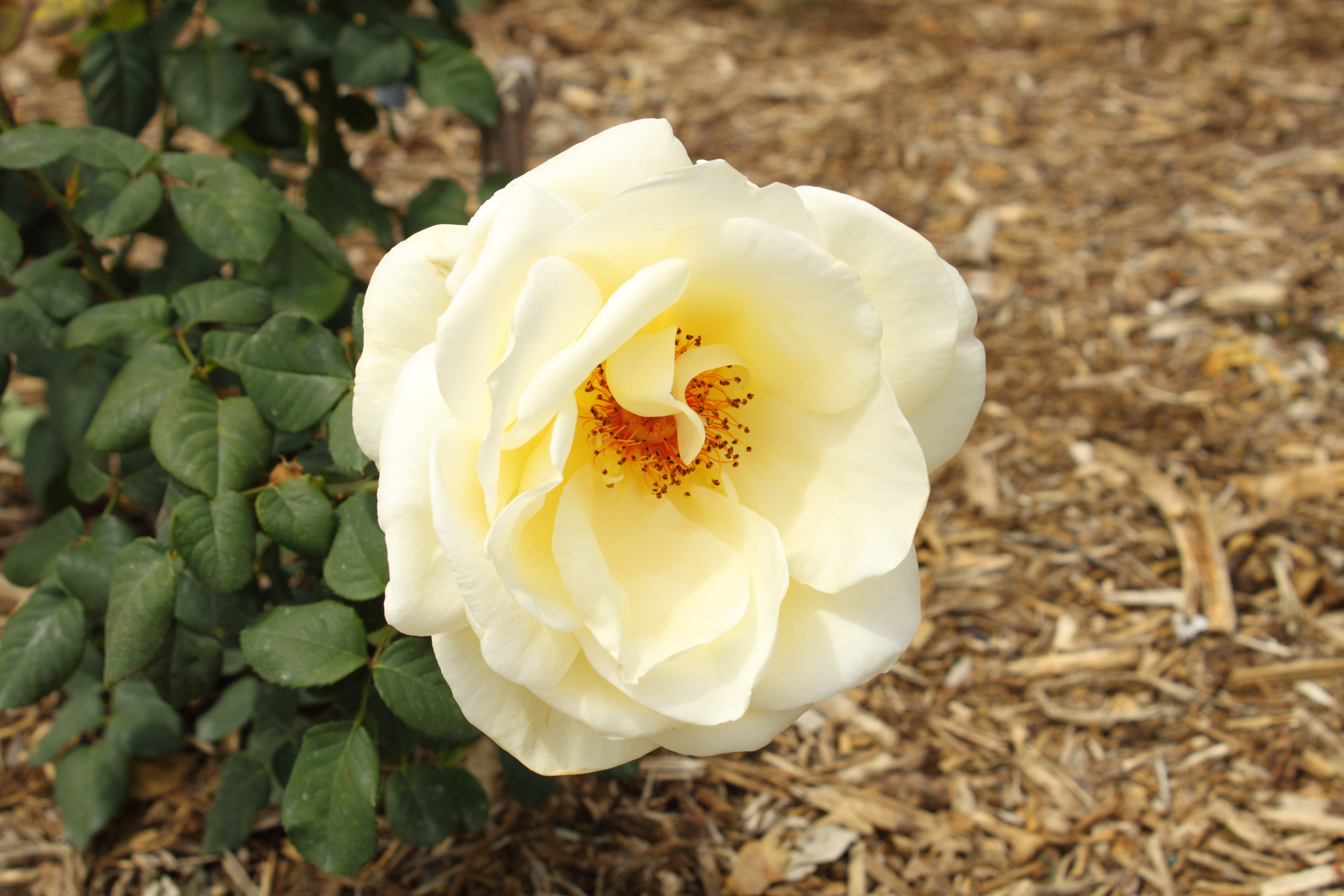
'Ivory Fashion', Boerner 1958

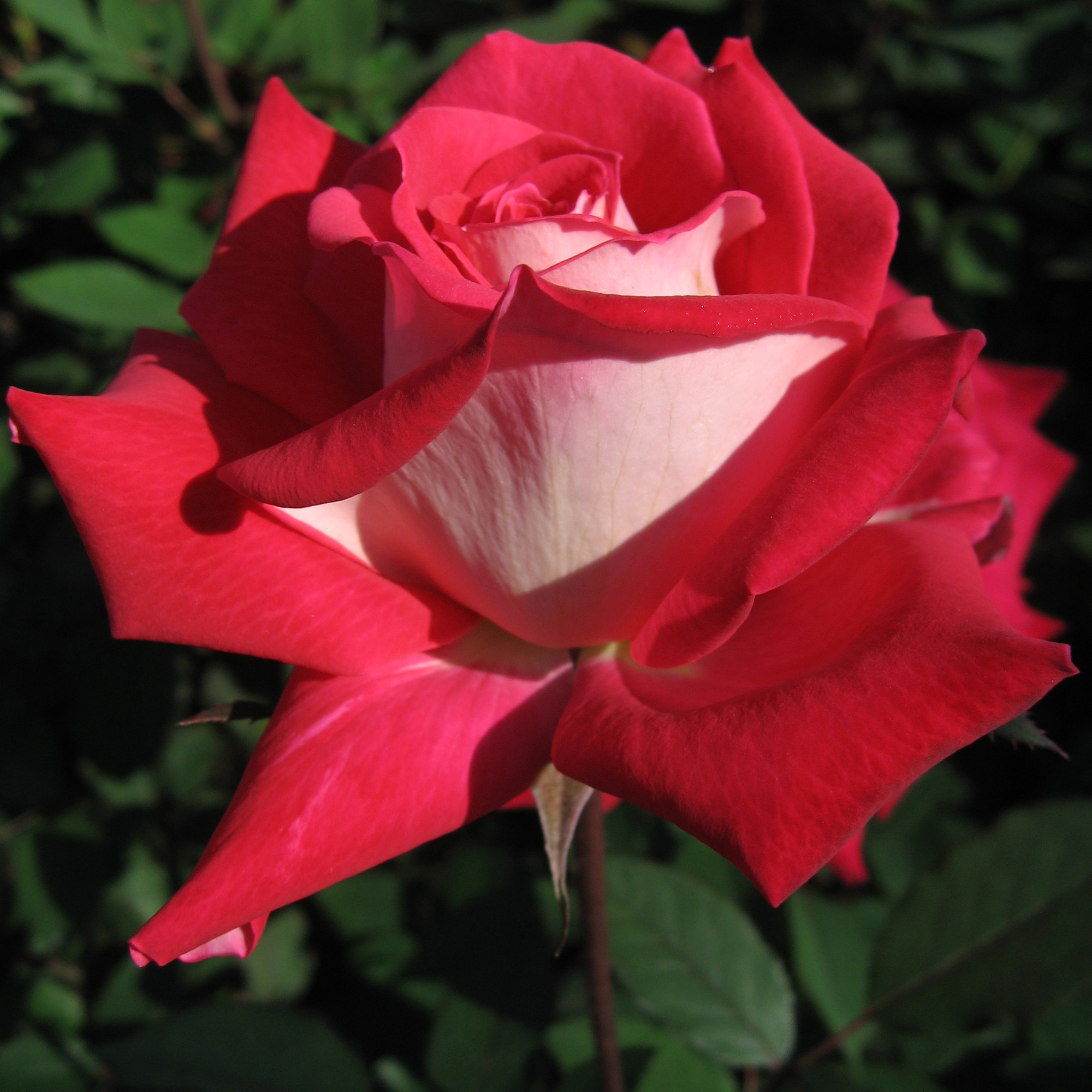
'Love', Warriner 1980

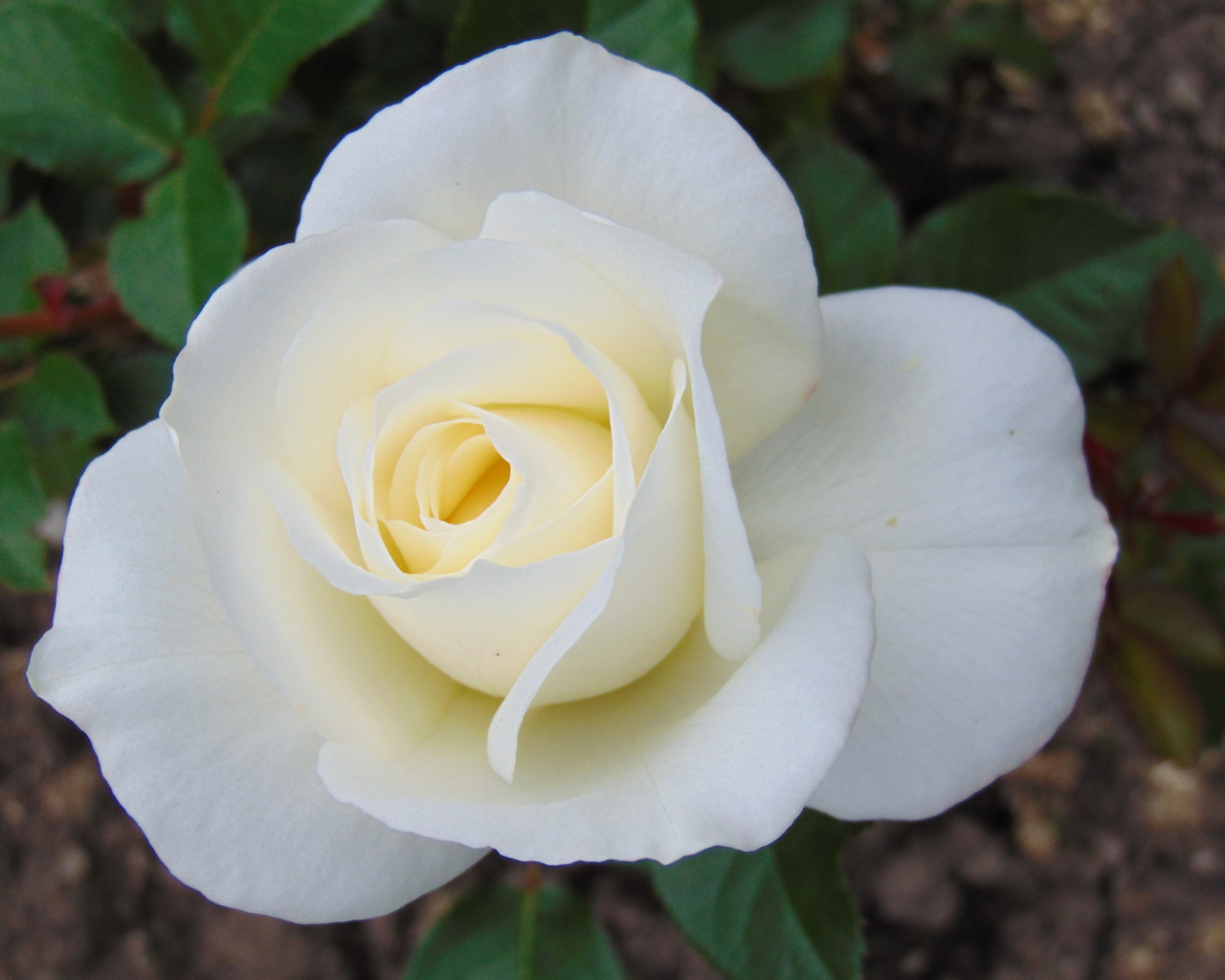
'Moondance', Zary 2007

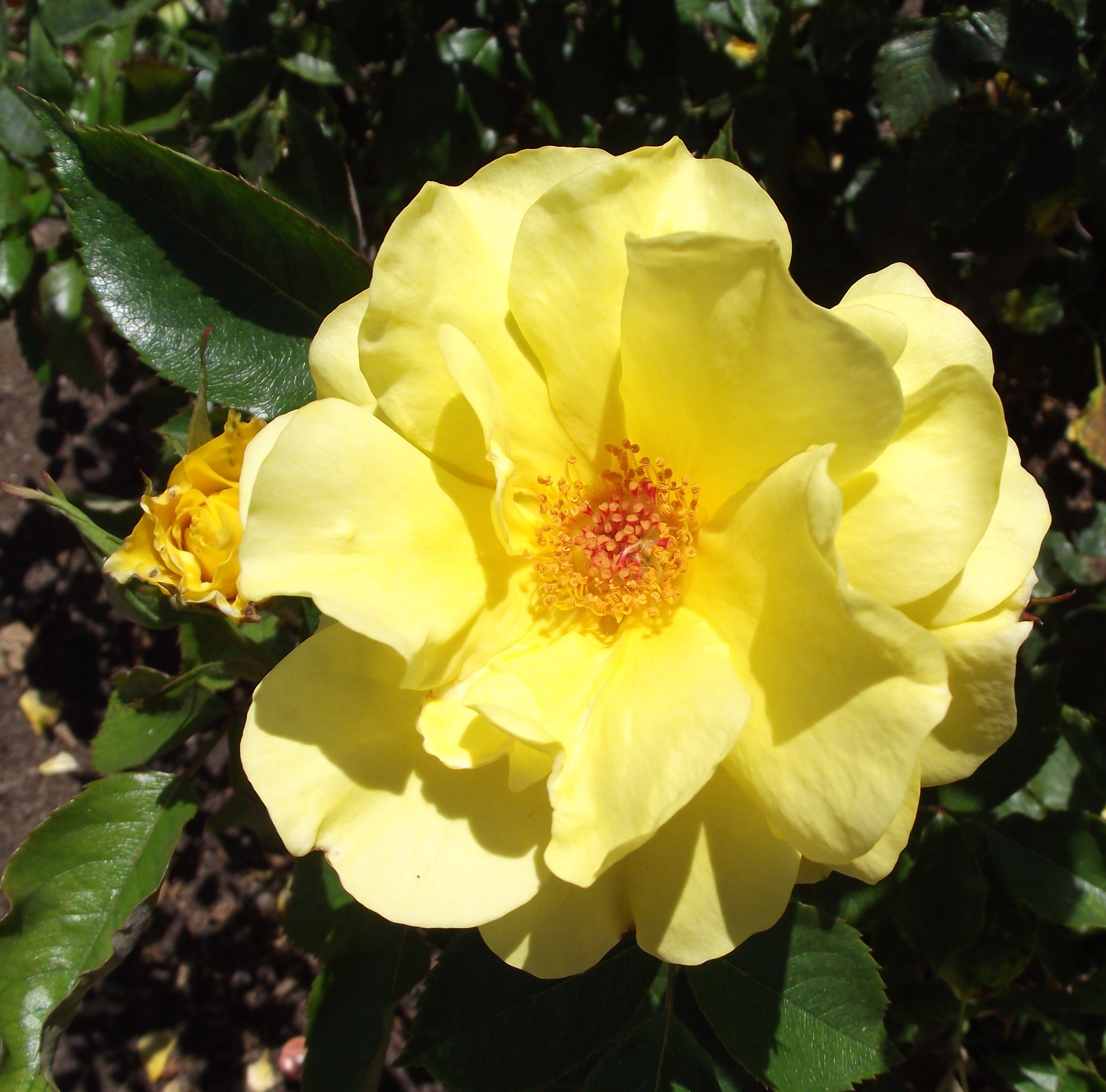
'Sun Flare', Warriner 1981

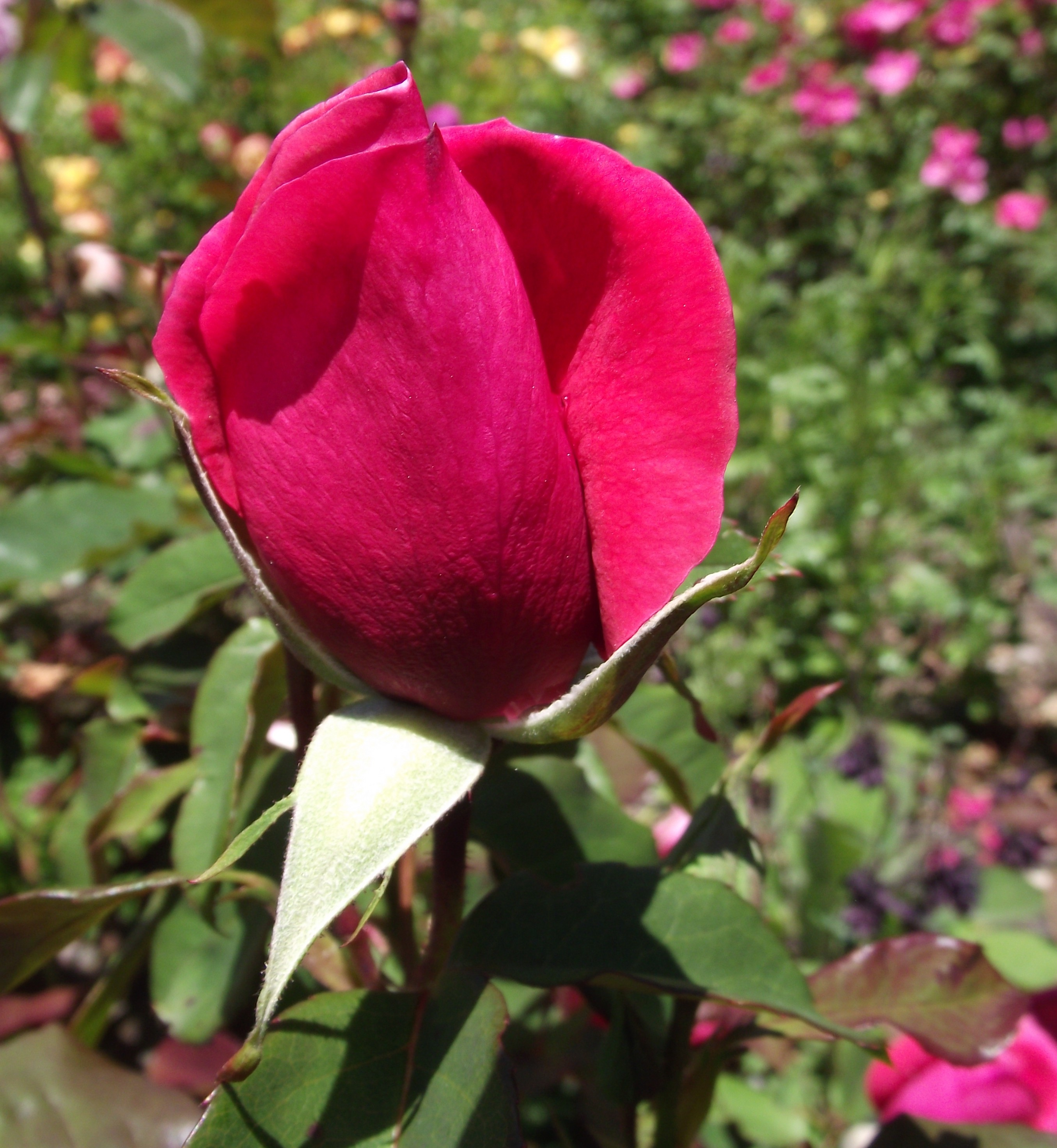
'Vogue', Boerner 1951

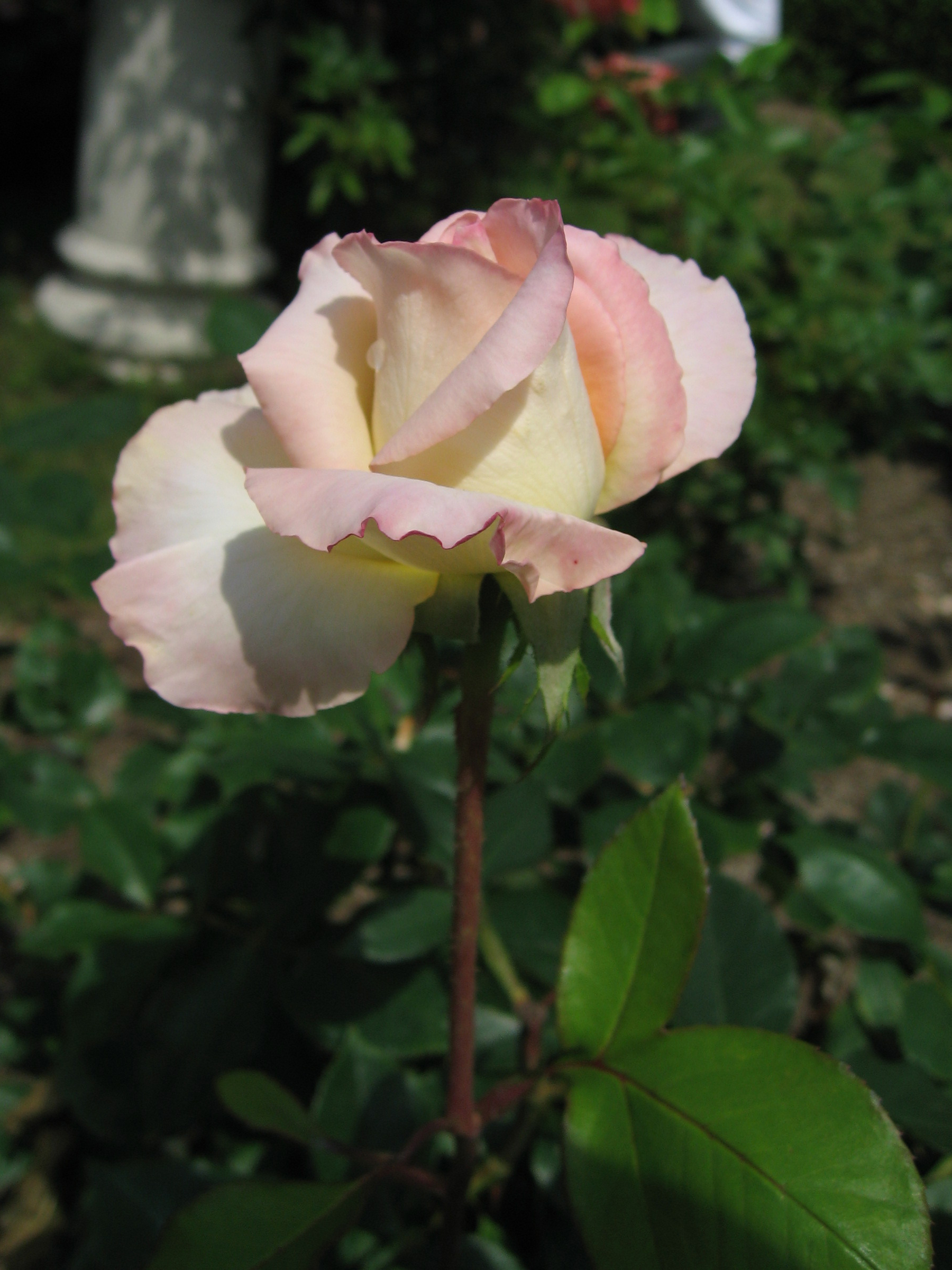
'Diana, Princess of Wales', Zary 1999
